= List of ferries across the Hudson River to New York City =

The following ferries have at one point or another crossed the North River between New York City and New Jersey. There was no ferry service between 1967 and 1989, when it was restarted by New York Waterway.

== Operating ==
Name	Manhattan end	New Jersey end	Began operations
NY Waterway	West Midtown; Brookfield Place; Pier 11/Wall Street	Edgewater Landing; Port Imperial; Lincoln Harbor; 14th Street (Hoboken); Hoboken Terminal; Paulus Hook; Liberty State Park	1986
Liberty Landing Ferry	Battery Park City	Warren Street	1999
Liberty Landing Ferry	Battery Park City	Liberty Landing	1999

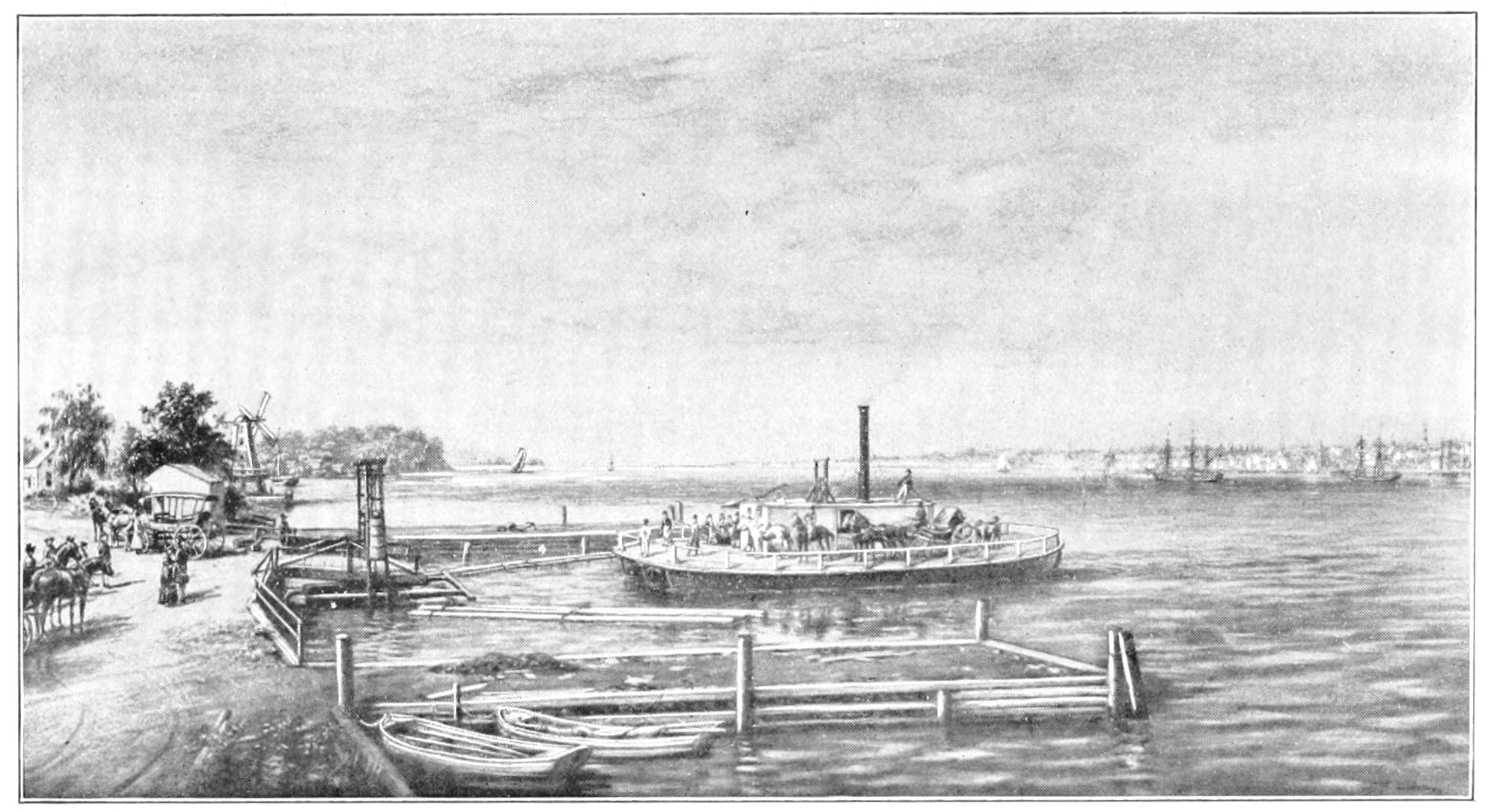
Depiction of first steam ferry from Paulus Hook

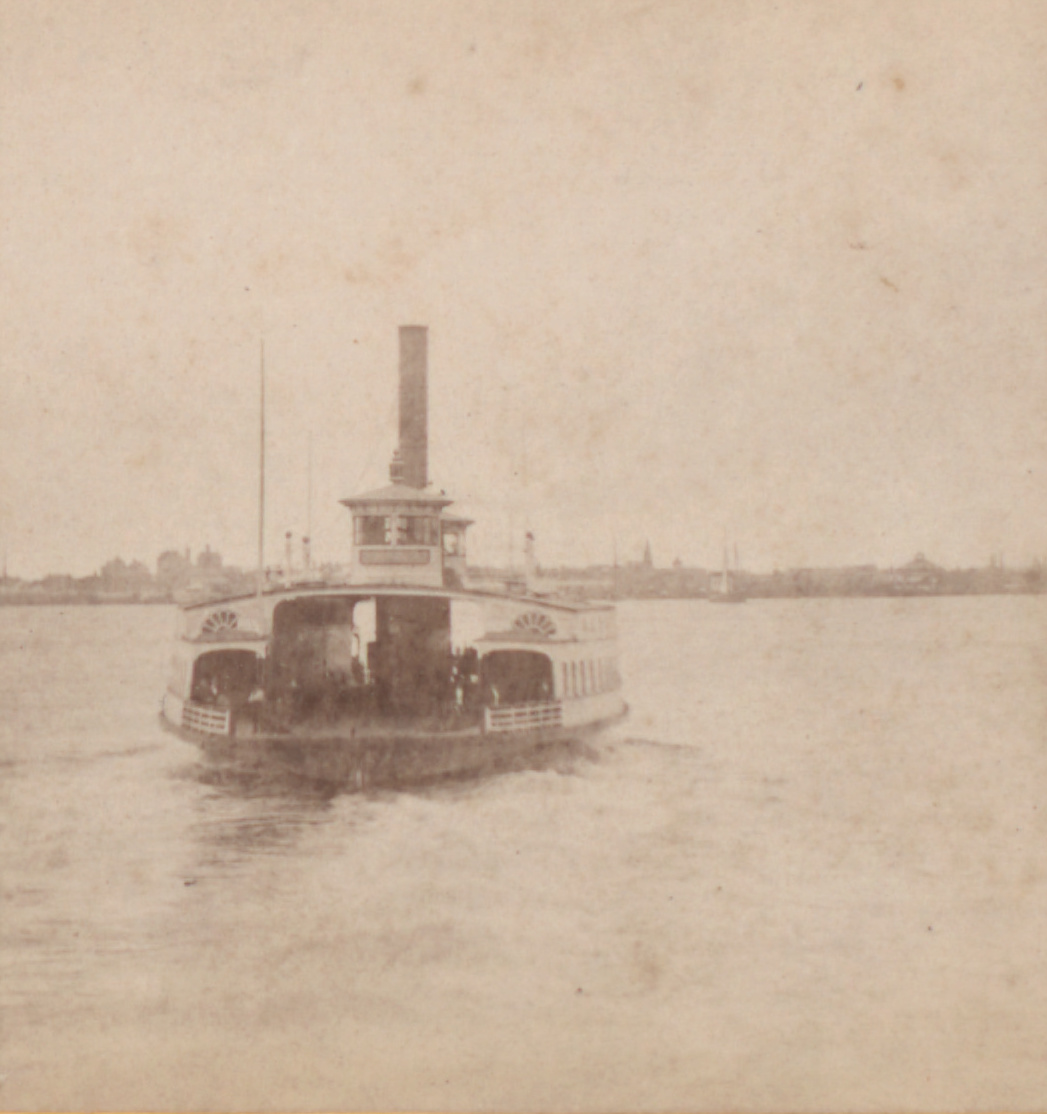
North River ferry

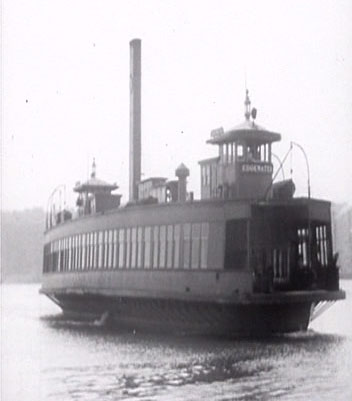
The Public Service Corporation-operated Edgewater, running from Edgewater Ferry Terminal to 125th Street (Manhattan) in 1941

== Row and Sail ==
Name	Manhattan end	New Jersey end	Operated	Notes
Bulls Ferry		Bulls Ferry	18th century	Bergen Township
Communipaw	Fort Amsterdam	Communipaw ferry	1661-	charter granted by Peter Stuyvesant, Director-General of New Netherland
Budd's Ferry	Cortlandt Street	Harsimus	1808–1818	
Weehawken Ferry	Weehawken Street?	Weehawken Cove?	1700-	royal patent from Richard Coote, 1st Earl of Bellomont
Burdett's Landing	Bloomingdale	Edgewater; Fort Lee	1758-	Hackensack Township
Tubby Hook Ferry	Dyckman Street	Closter Dock?		

== Horse ferries ==
Team boats served New York City for "about ten years, from 1814-1824. They were of eight horse-power and crossed the rivers in from twelve to twenty minutes."

In 1812, two steam boats designed by Robert Fulton were placed in use in New York, for the Paulus Hook Ferry from the foot of Cortlandt Street, and on the Hoboken Ferry from the foot of Barclay Street. The Juliana, running from Barclay Street, was withdrawn from service, as announced, in favor of the "more convenient" horse boat. It is almost certain, however, that this retrograde step was taken because of the monopoly enjoyed by Mssrs. Fulton and Livingston for the navigation of the waters of New York State by steam.

== Steam ==
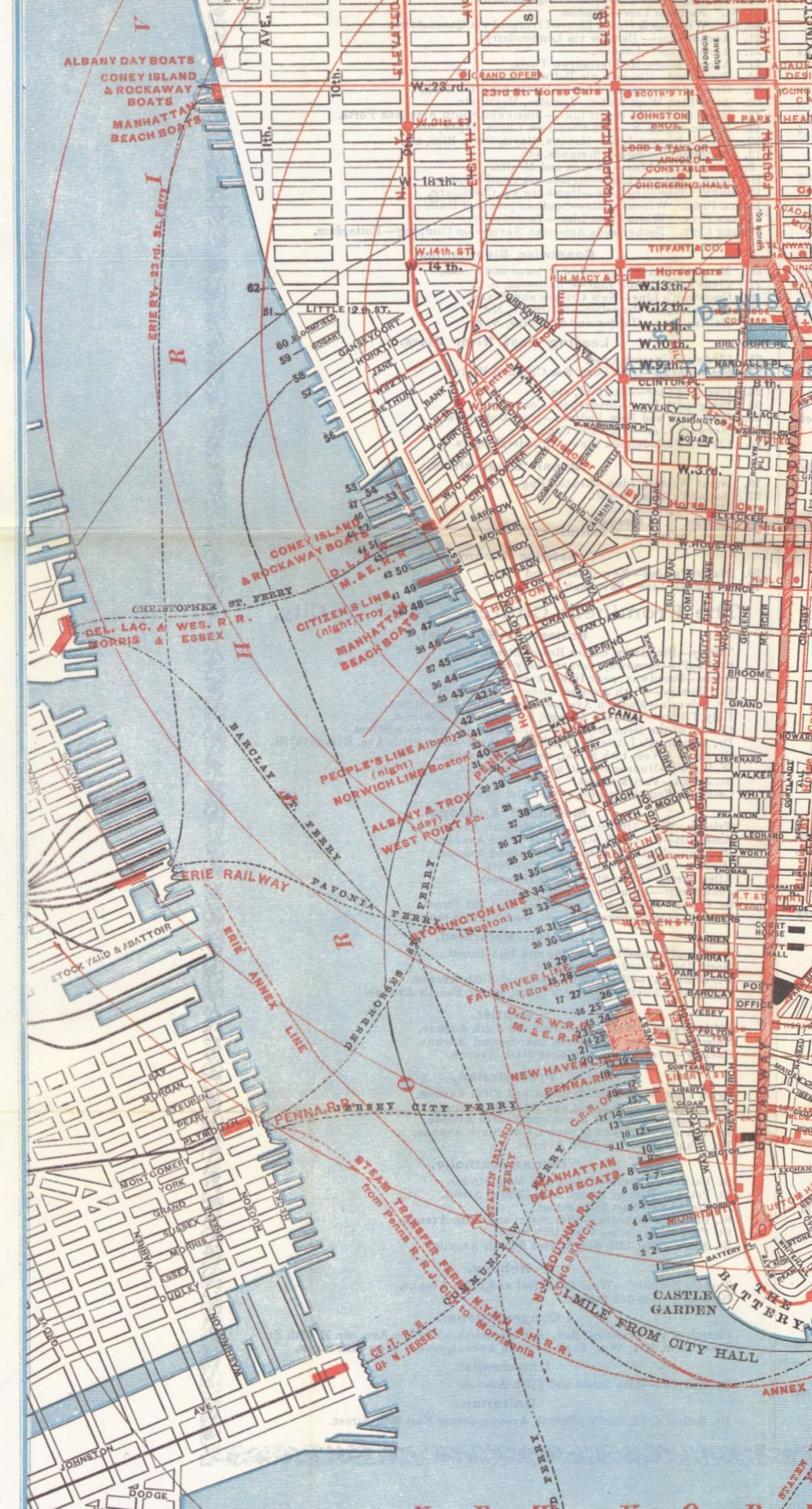
Map of the Hudson River ferries to Lower Manhattan, 1879

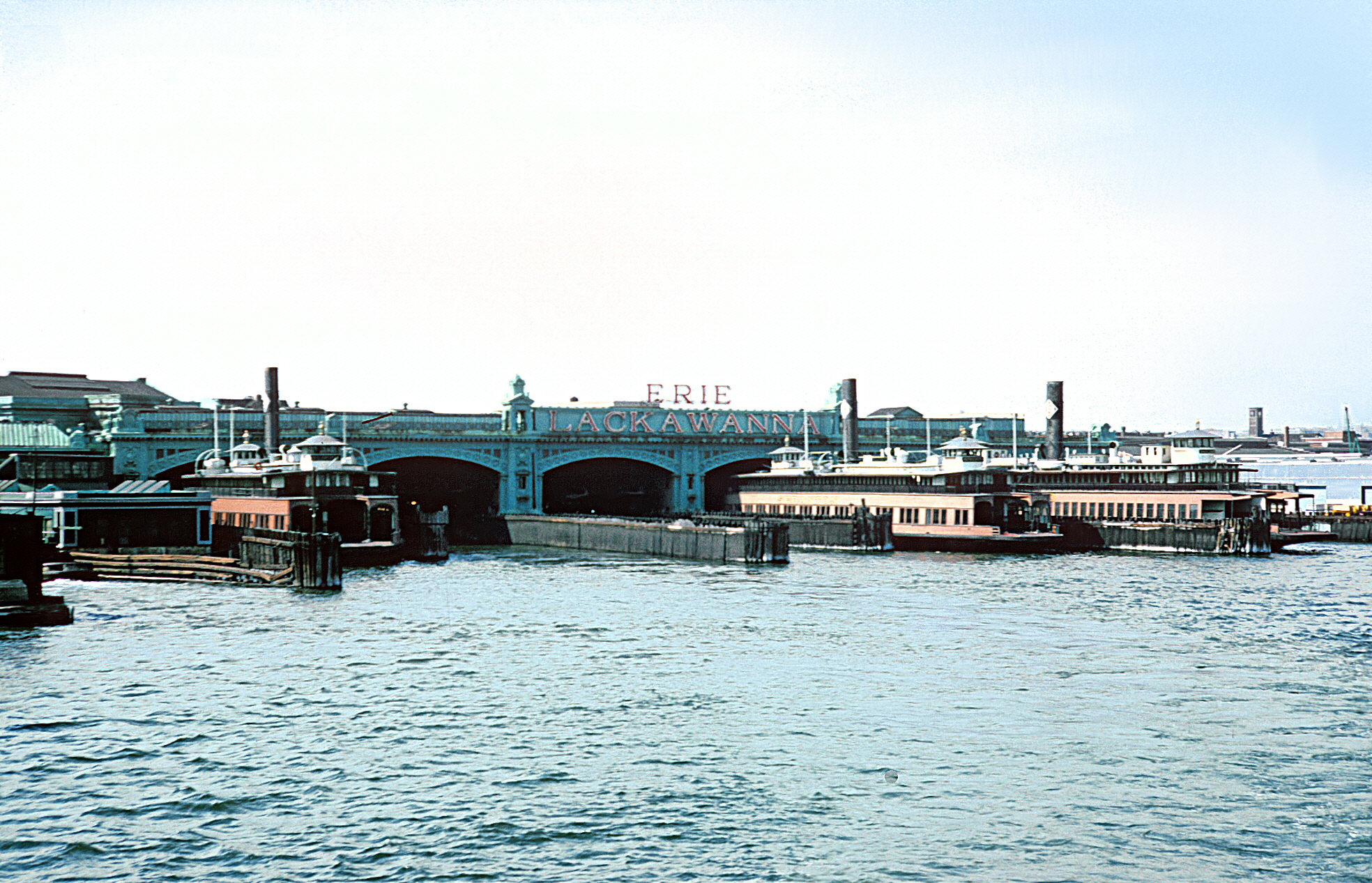
Erie-Lackawanna ferries docked at Hoboken Terminal on September 3, 1965

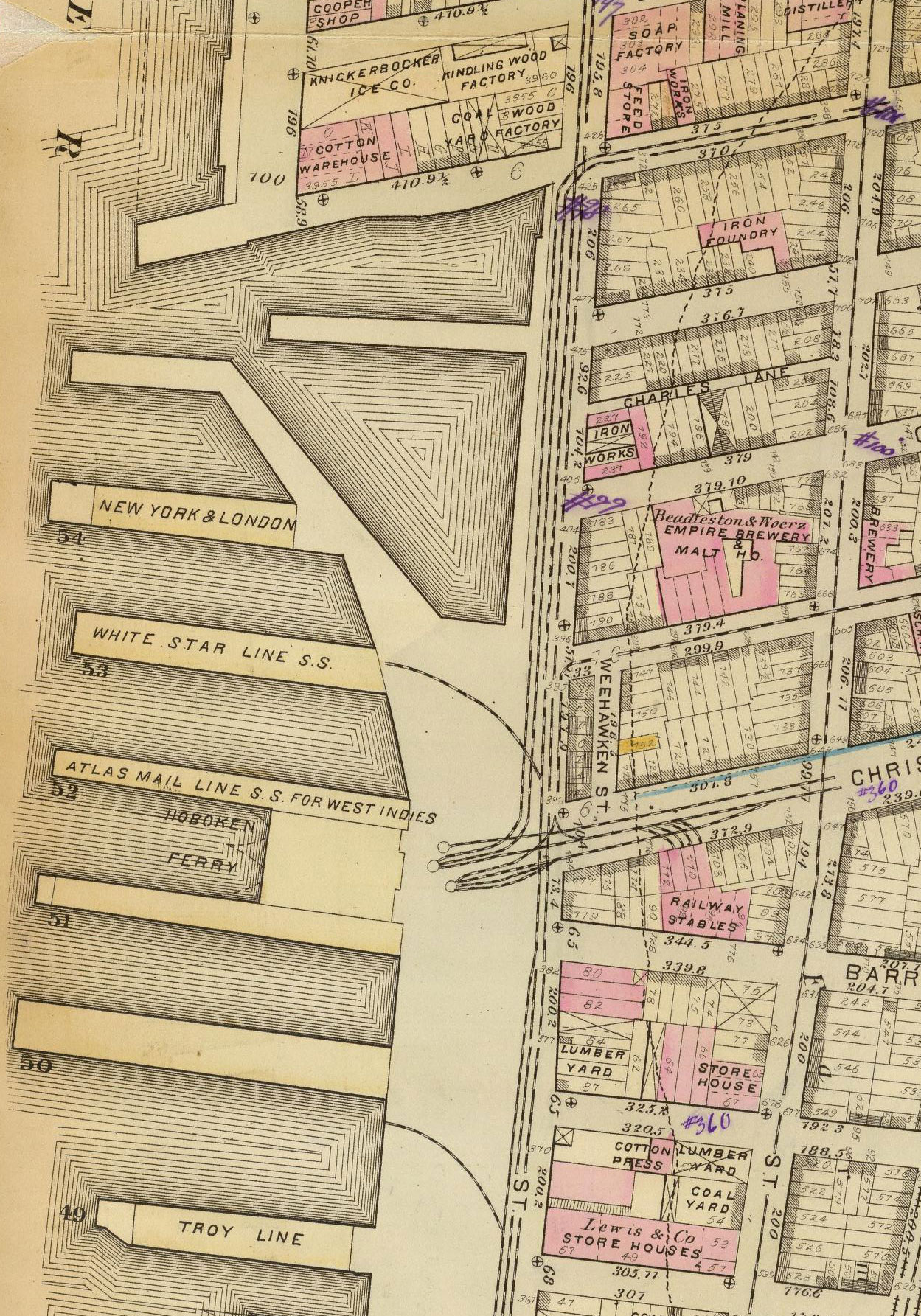
Christopher Street end of the Hoboken Ferry

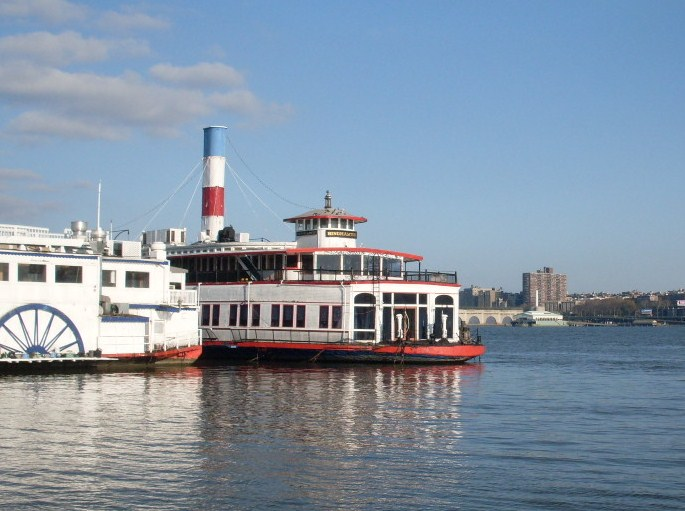
The Binghamton travelled between Hoboken and Manhattan, was subsequently used as a floating restaurant, before being scrapped in 2017.

Name	Manhattan end	New Jersey end	Operated	Notes
Royal Blue Line Ferry.	South Ferry	Communipaw Terminal	(1897–1905)	The Royal Blue was a Baltimore and Ohio Railroad train to Washington, D.C. via Central Railroad of New Jersey and Reading Railroad
Communipaw Ferry	Liberty Street Ferry Terminal	Communipaw Terminal	(1661–1967)	Central Railroad of New Jersey
Jersey City Ferry	Cortland Street Ferry Depot	Paulus Hook, later named Exchange Place	(1764–1949)	Pennsylvania Railroad, later via its Jersey City Branch
West Shore Ferry	Cortland Street Ferry Depot	Weehawken Terminal	(1885–1959)	West Shore Railroad
	Vesey Street	Hoboken		Ferry service restored at Battery Park City Ferry Terminal
Hoboken Ferry	Barclay Street	Hoboken Terminal	(1821–1967)	Delaware, Lackawanna and Western Railroad, later Erie Lackawanna Railway. Originally operated by the Hoboken Ferry Company
	Murray Street	Hoboken		
Pavonia Ferry	Chambers Street Ferry Terminal	Pavonia Terminal	(1856–1958)	Erie Railroad purchased several ferries from previous operators in 1856. Unclear when ferry service from Chambers Street began.
	Duane Street	Paulus Hook		Paterson and Hudson River Railroad
Franklin Street Ferry	Franklin Street	Weehawken		West Shore Railroad
	Hubert Street	Hoboken		
Desbrosses Street Ferry	Desbrosses Street	Exchange Place	1862–1930	Pennsylvania Railroad
	Desbrosses Street	Weehawken Terminal		West Shore Railroad
	Spring Street	Hoboken		
Spring Street Ferry	Spring Street	Fort Lee		
	Clarkson Street	Communipaw Terminal		CNJ
Christopher Street Ferry.	Christopher Street	Hoboken Terminal	1838–1955	Delaware, Lackawanna and Western Railroad. Originally operated by the Hoboken Ferry Company.
	13th Street	Bay Street, Jersey City		Pennsylvania Railroad
	13th Street	Weehawken Terminal		West Shore Railroad
	14th Street	Hoboken Terminal		Delaware, Lackawanna and Western Railroad
Hoboken Ferry	14th Street	14th Street (Hoboken)		
	23rd Street	Communipaw Terminal		Central Railroad of New Jersey
23rd Street Ferry	23rd Street	Exchange Place		Pennsylvania Railroad
Pavonia Ferry	23rd Street	Pavonia Terminal		Erie
	23rd Street	Hoboken Terminal		Delaware, Lackawanna and Western Railroad
Hoboken Ferry	23rd Street	14th Street (Hoboken)		
	23rd Street	Edgewater		
	34th Street	Exchange Place		Pennsylvania Railroad
Weehawken Ferry	42nd Street	Weehawken Terminal	(1884–1959)	West Shore and NYC RR
North Weehawken Ferry	42nd Street	Slough's Meadow	(1859–1902)	Weehawken Ferry Company (1859–1872); New York Central Railroad (1872–1902)
125th Street Ferry	125th Street	Edgewater	1903–1941	Public Service Corporation of New Jersey
Fort Lee Ferry	130th Street	Edgewater		
Englewood Ferry	Dyckman Street	Englewood	1915–1942	during colonial era at Closter Dock

== See also ==
- List of ferries across the East River
- List of fixed crossings of the Hudson River
- List of fixed crossings of the East River
- New York New Jersey Rail car float, Brooklyn to Jersey City
- New York Harbor
  - Geography of New York Harbor
- North River
- Port of New York and New Jersey
- Timeline of Jersey City area railroads
- Perth Amboy Ferry Slip

== Bibliography ==
- Brian J. Cudahy, Over and Back: The History of Ferryboats in New York Harbor
- Arthur G. Adams, The Hudson Through the Years
