= Battery Park City Ferry Terminal =

Ferry terminal in Manhattan, New York

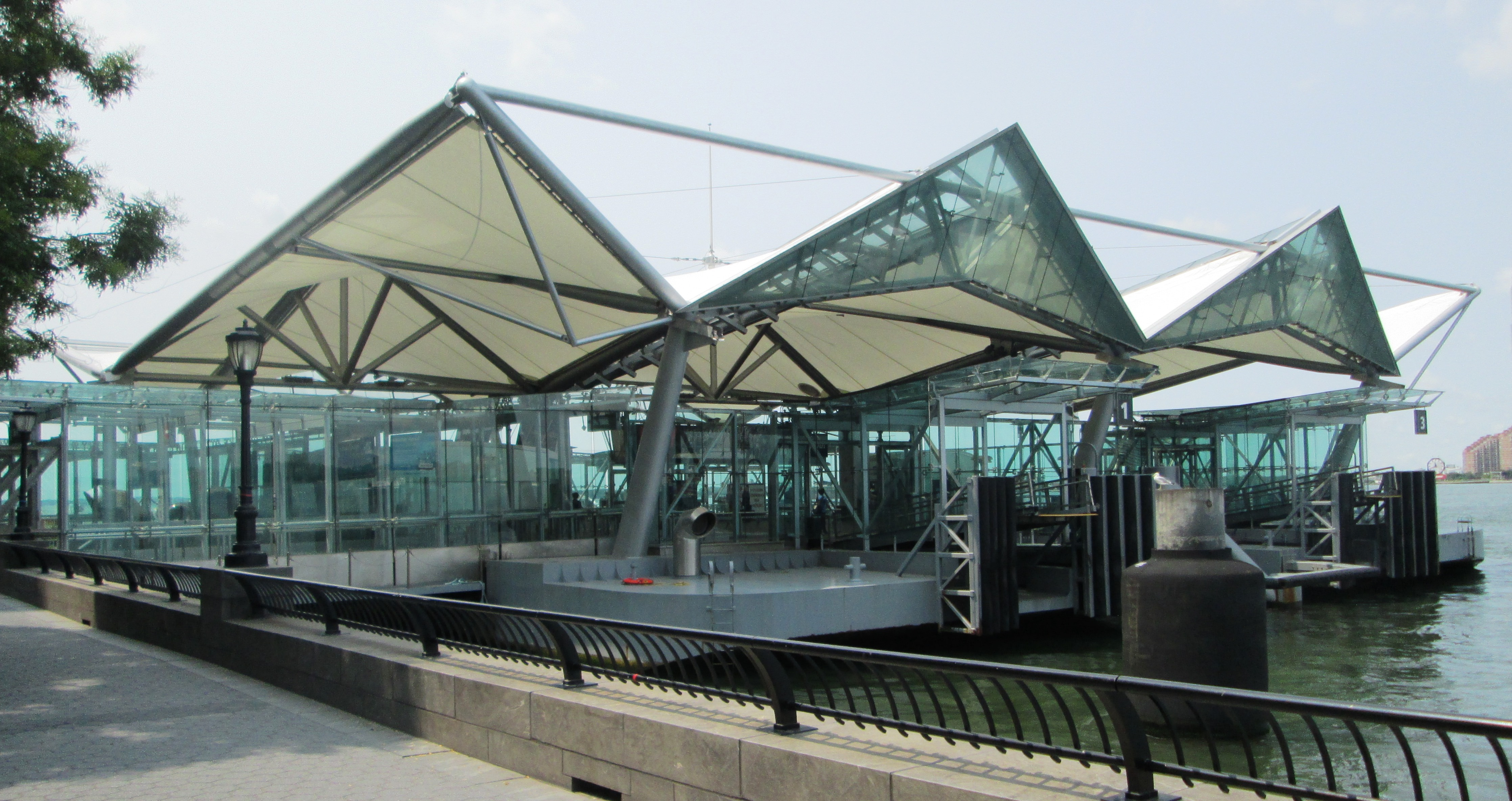
- The floating dock terminal in 2014

General information
- Other names: Brookfield Place Terminal
- Location: Vesey Street; Manhattan, New York; U.S.
- Coordinates: 40°42′54.6″N 74°1′2.6″W
- System: Ferry terminal
- Owner: Port Authority of New York and New Jersey
- Operator: NY Waterway
- Lines: Liberty Landing Ferry; NY Waterway; NYC Ferry; Seastreak
- Connections: New York City Bus: M9, M20; Downtown Connection

Construction
- Accessible: Yes

History
- Opened: October 16, 1989; March 18, 2009 (current terminal)

Services
Preceding station	NYC Ferry	Following station
St. George toward Pier 11/Wall Street	St. George	West Midtown Terminus

Other services
NY Waterway, Liberty Landing Ferry, Seastreak
Location

The Battery Park City Ferry Terminal, is a passenger ferry terminal in Battery Park City, Manhattan, serving ferries along the Hudson River in New York City and northeastern New Jersey. It provides slips to ferries, water taxis, and sightseeing boats in the Port of New York and New Jersey.

The floating dock is moored at the foot of Vesey Street, consisting of four bow-loading slips and two side loading points to serve an additional slip. The mono-hull structure is the largest of its type in the world, covering 0.75 acres (0.30 ha) acres, its two towers anchored to bedrock 75 feet (23 m) below the water's surface.

The terminal is primarily served by commuter ferries operated by NY Waterway, which refers to the terminal as Brookfield Place / Battery Park City, Seastreak, which refers to it as Brookfield Place, and Liberty Landing Ferry, which refers to it as Brookfield Place Terminal. Each of these names refer to Brookfield Place, a shopping center and office building complex formerly known as the World Financial Center. NYC Ferry uses the terminal for its St. George route, referring to it as Battery Park City / Vesey St.

== History ==
Regular ferry service between lower Manhattan and the Village of Communipaw (in today's Jersey City) dates back to at least 1661 with the founding of the Communipaw ferry during the Dutch colonial period. The Jersey City Ferry began service in July 1764 between Paulus Hook to Mesier's dock, which was located at the foot of Courtland Street. Both ferries continued to operate into the 19th and 20th centuries and docked at Liberty Street Ferry Terminal and the Cortland Street Ferry Depot respectively. When these ferry slips were closed in the 1950s and 1960s they were demolished and the slips were filled in to create Battery Park City.

In 1986 NY Waterway restarted ferry service across the Hudson River. A ferry slip opened at Battery Park City on October 16, 1989 with the intentions of reducing rush-hour crowds on the PATH trains serving the World Trade Center station.

Port Authority of New York and New Jersey first commissioned the construction of the current terminal in 2000, but plans were put on hold following the September 11 attacks.

A 1,200-ton hull was constructed in Corpus Christi, Texas and was transported to Pier 39 in the Sunset Park neighborhood of Brooklyn in 2006, where the remainder of the terminal was constructed. At a total cost of $50 million, the terminal was then floated up to Battery Park City and opened March 18, 2009. The terminal reconstruction project was named Best Public Works Project by New York Construction News.

Since June 2013, ferries using the terminal, in accordance with the previously disregarded Rule 34(a)(i) (which prescribes maneuvering and warning signals), sound their horns to indicate their actions, creating what many local residents perceive as noise pollution.

== Service ==
=== Ferry ===
NY Waterway is the largest operator of services in the terminal. It serves Port Imperial in Weehawken and 14th Street in Hoboken during weekday rush hours, and Hoboken Terminal, Paulus Hook Ferry Terminal, and Belford in Monmouth County 7 days a week. Goldman Sachs commissions two ferries to run between the terminal and Paulus Hook Ferry Terminal, connecting its offices in Battery Park City and Jersey City, with service beginning February 19, 2013. York and Jersey are operated by NY Waterway, flying the flag of the ferry service but not bearing its name or logo. The ferries are available to both employees and the general public since, by law, ferries utilizing the public terminal must be available to the public.

Liberty Landing Ferry provides ferry service to Liberty Landing Marina in Jersey City with an intermediate stop at Warren Street. The service is operated by Hornblower Cruises, which also operates NYC Ferry and ferries to the Statue of Liberty National Monument.

Seastreak operates service to Monmouth County, NJ. Seastreak's service stops at Battery Maritime Building before continuing on to Atlantic Highlands and Highlands on the Raritan Bayshore.

Service on the St. George route of the NYC Ferry system began in August 2021. Battery Park City is an intermediate station between West Midtown Ferry Terminal and Pier 11/Wall Street.

Service to South Amboy, NJ via NY Waterway began on October 30, 2023.

==== Routes ====
Destination	Company	Intermediate Stops	Operational Hours
Atlantic Highlands/Highlands	Seastreak	Battery Maritime Building; Originates at East 34th Street	Weekdays
West Midtown	NYC Ferry	Pier 11/Wall Street; Originates at West Midtown: St. George Terminal, Staten Island; Bay Ridge, Brooklyn; Atlantic Avenue, Brooklyn	7 days a week
Liberty Landing	Liberty Landing Ferry	Warren Street	Weekdays
Paulus Hook	NY Waterway	None	7 days a week
Hoboken Terminal	NY Waterway	None	7 days a week
Belford	NY Waterway	Pier 11/Wall Street; Originates at West Midtown	7 days a week
Port Imperial	NY Waterway	Hoboken 14th Street; Originates at Pier 11/Wall Street	Weekday peak hours
South Amboy	NY Waterway	Pier 11/Wall Street; Originates at West Midtown	Weekday peak hours

=== Bus ===
New York City Transit bus routes M9 and M20 stop on the nearby corner of Vesey Street and North End Avenue. There is a free connecting bus to the South Amboy terminal that travels through South Amboy and Sayreville.

== See also ==
- List of ferries across the Hudson River to New York City
- Liberty Street Ferry Terminal
- Cortlandt Street Ferry Depot
