= Jersey City station =

Jersey City station may refer to:

- the Central Railroad of New Jersey Terminal in Jersey City, New Jersey
- Exchange Place station (Pennsylvania Railroad), the Pennsylvania Railroad station in Jersey City, New Jersey
- the Pavonia Terminal, the Erie Railroad station in Jersey City, New Jersey
