= Cortlandt Street Ferry Depot =

Ferry terminal in Manhattan, New York

Coordinates: 40°42′41″N 74°00′54″W

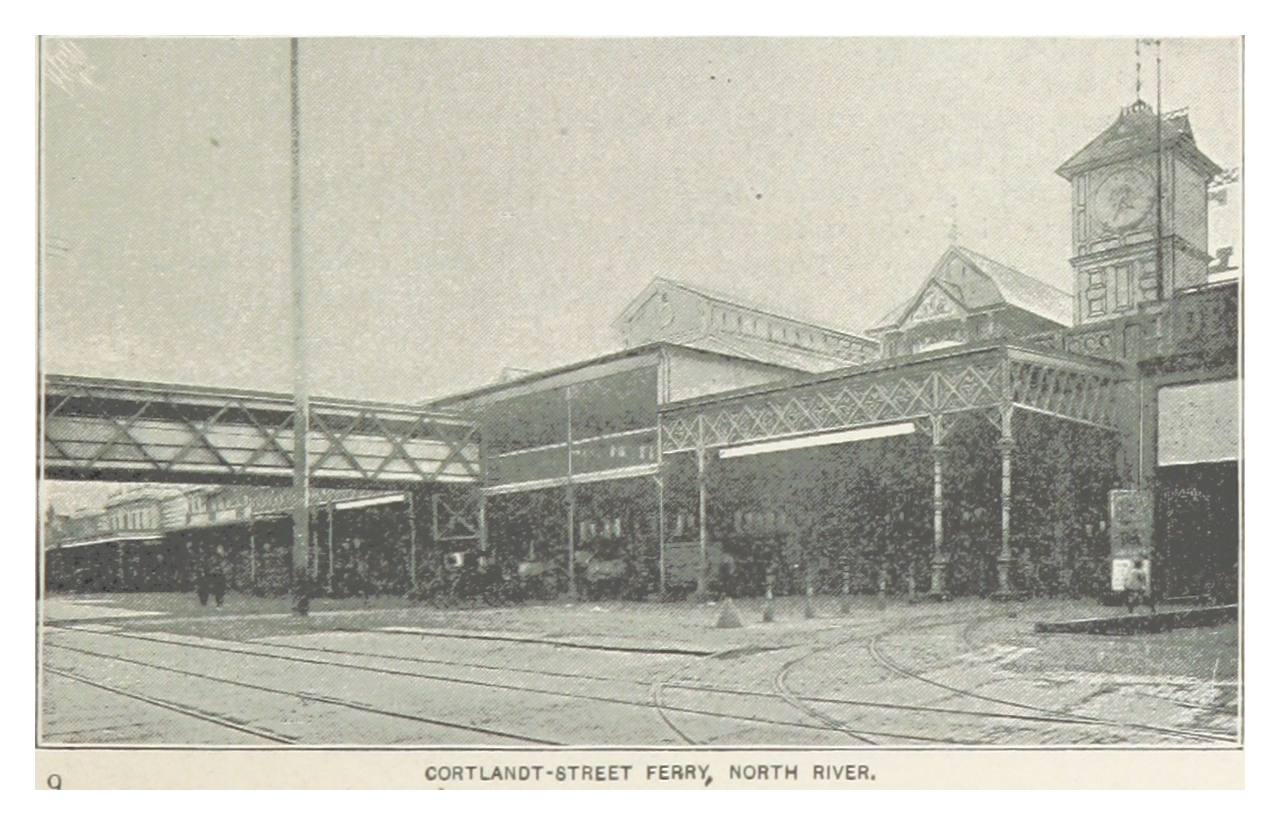
Cortlandt Street Ferry Depot in the early 1890s

Cortlandt Street Ferry Depot was the main ferry terminal of the Pennsylvania Railroad and the West Shore Railroad on the North River (Hudson River) in lower Manhattan. The railroads operated ferries to their terminal stations on the Hudson River waterfront in New Jersey at Exchange Place and Weehawken, respectively.

The depot was next to Liberty Street Ferry Terminal from which the Central Railroad of New Jersey operated its Communipaw ferry to Communipaw Terminal.

== History ==
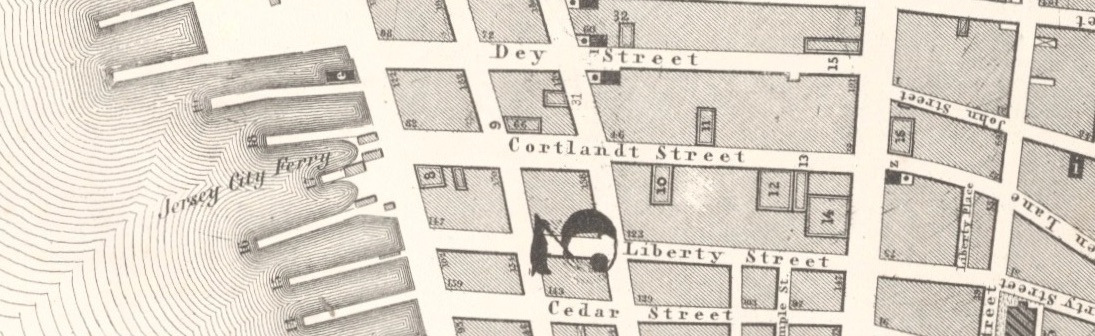
A map showing the Jersey City Ferry's terminal at Cortlandt Street, 1857

As early as July 1764 a ferry began operating from Paulus Hook to Mesier's dock which was located at the foot of Courtland Street (where Cortlandt Street Ferry Depot would be built). Almost immediately and for several decades subsequently, a complicated series of legal battles broke out over who should operate the ferries, where the crossing(s) should be located and at what rate passengers and other cargo should be charged for the journey.

The first steam ferry service in the world began operations in 1812 between Paulus Hook and Manhattan and reduced the journey time to a then remarkable 14 minutes. With the arrival of the railroad station at Paulus Hook in 1834 and the arrival of the Morris and Essex Railroad service on October 14, 1836 the number of passengers and the value of the Jersey City Ferry continued to increase.

The terminal was located one block west of the Ninth Avenue Elevated's Cortlandt Street Station which operated from 1874 until 1940.

== See also ==
- Whitehall Terminal
- Chambers Street Ferry Terminal
- Liberty Street Ferry Terminal
- Battery Park City Ferry Terminal

== Gallery ==
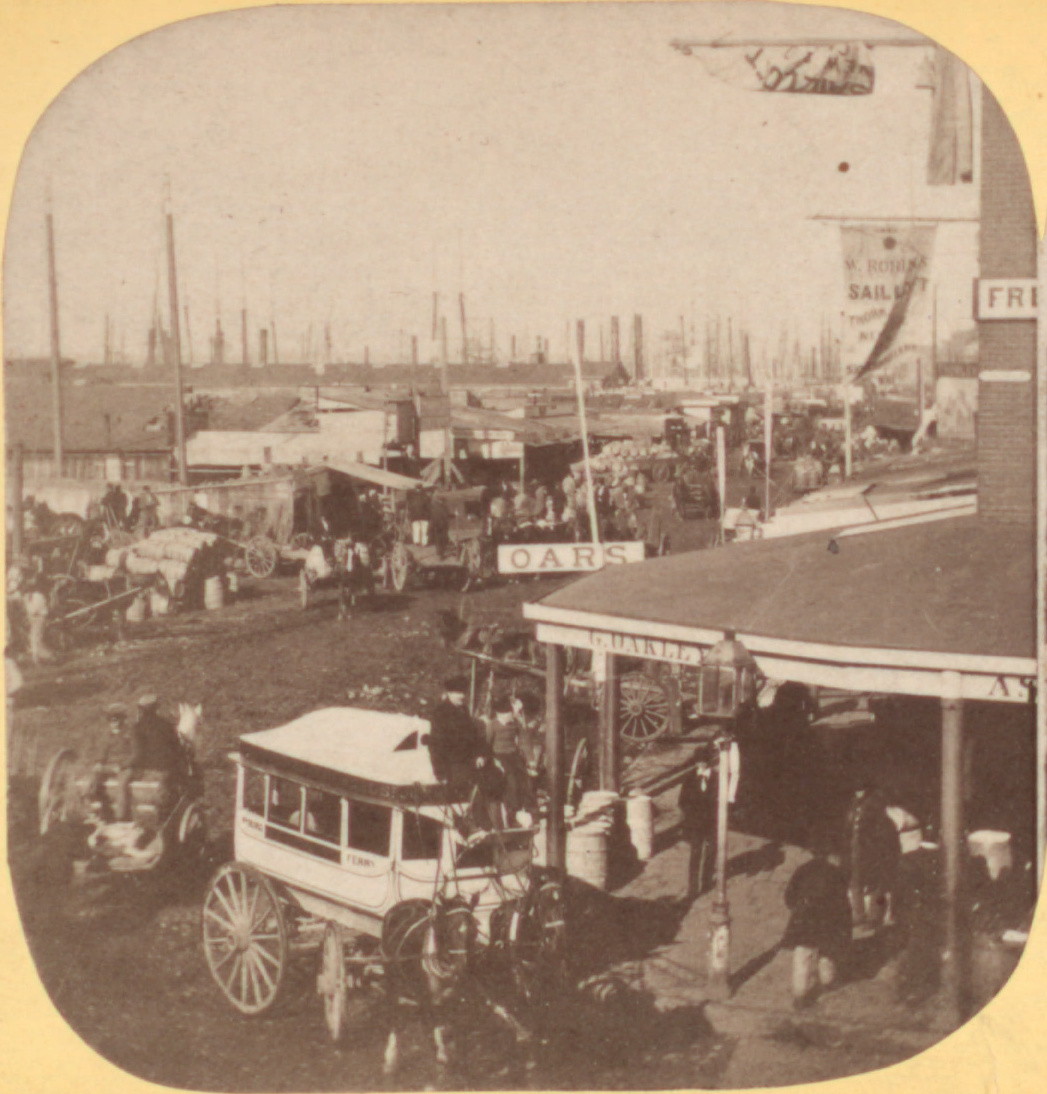
The Jersey City Ferry slip at the foot of Courtlandt Street, ca. 1860

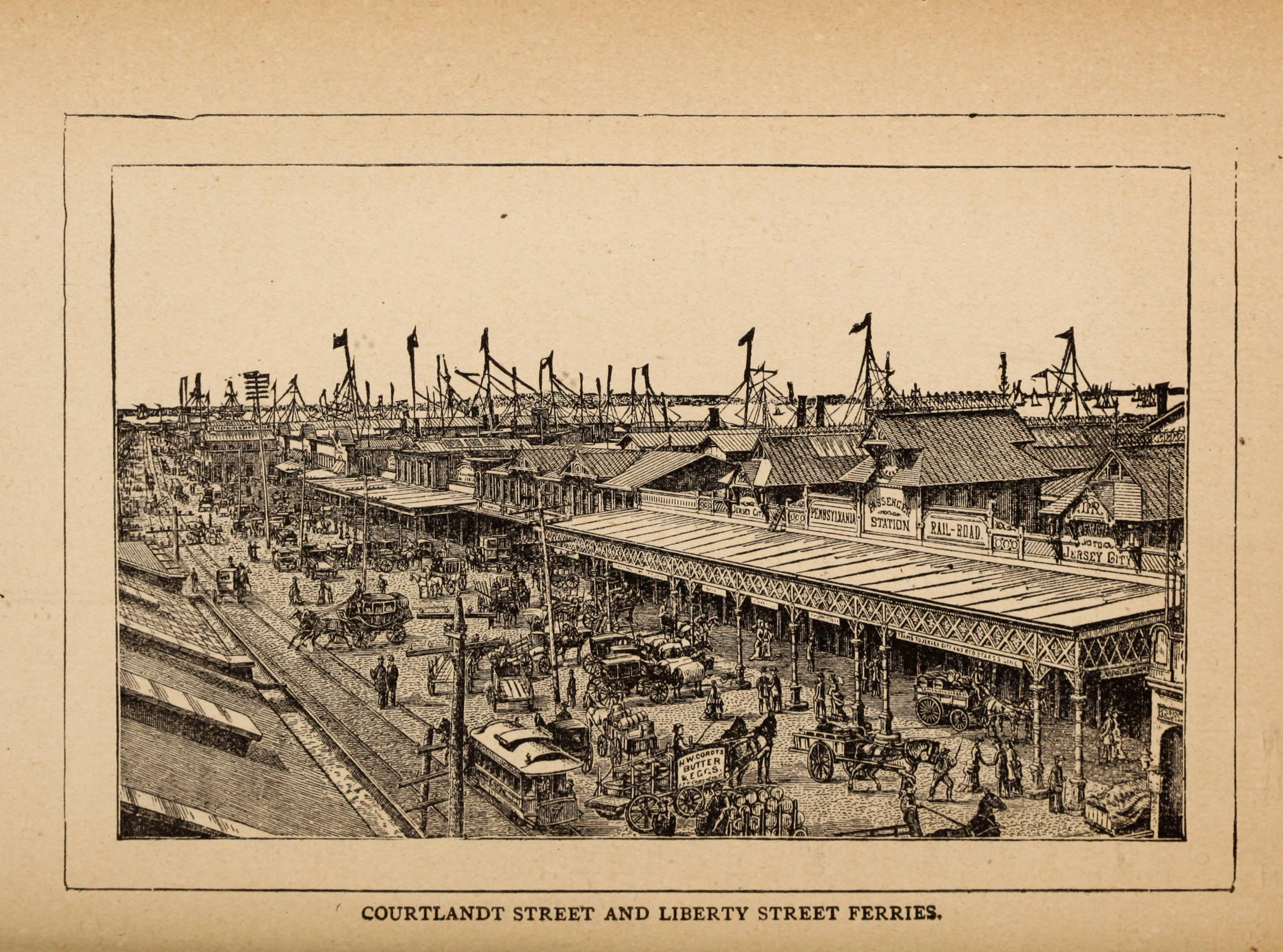
Cortlandt and Liberty Street Ferries, ca. 1882

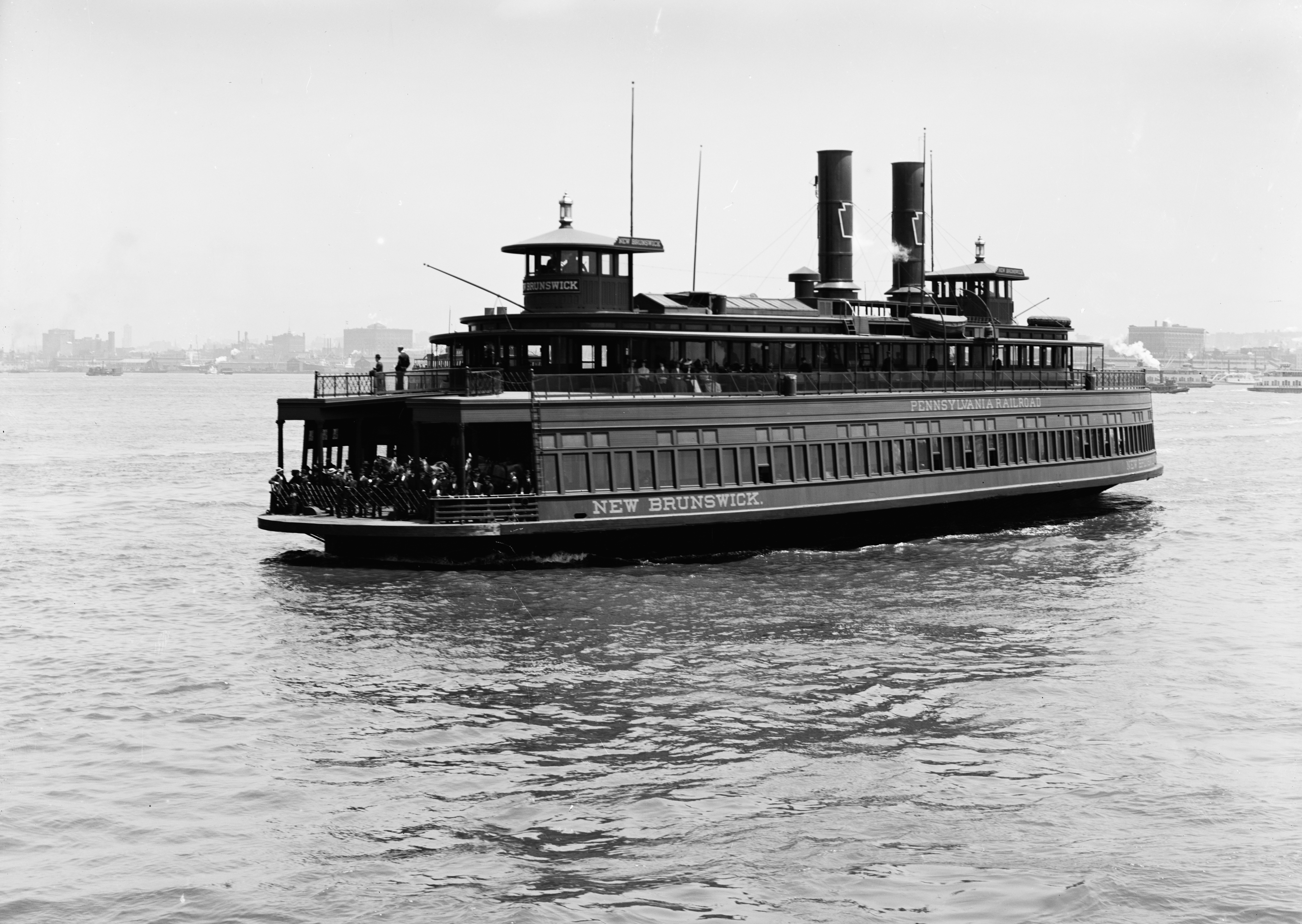
The New Brunswick one of the Pennsylvania Railroad's ferries across the Hudson, ca. 1905

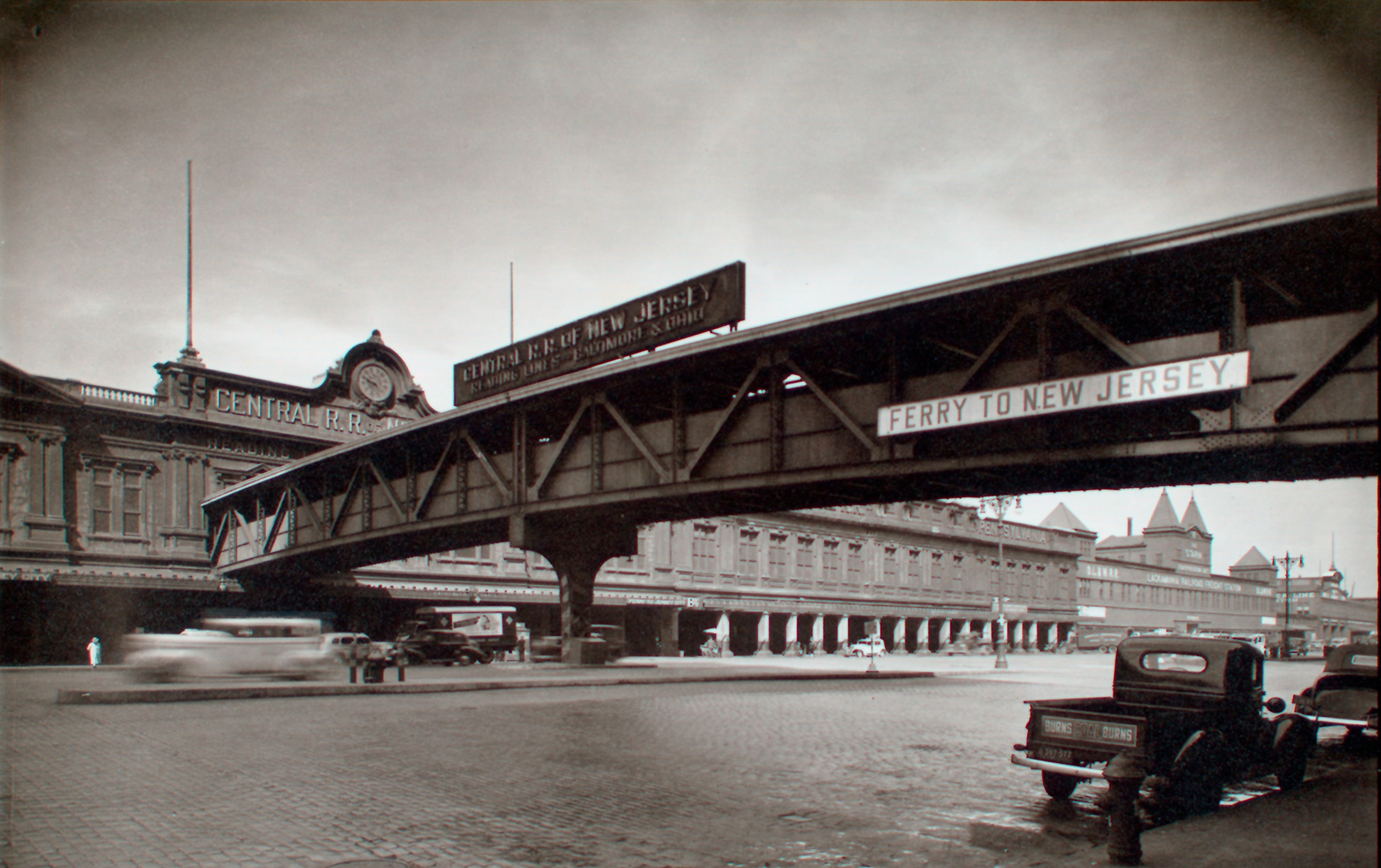
Cortlandt Street Ferry Depot is visible underneath a pedestrian overpass at Liberty Street Ferry Terminal, 1938

Preceding station	New York Central Railroad	Following station
Weehawken Terminus	Weehawken Ferry	Terminus
Preceding station	Pennsylvania Railroad	Following station
Exchange Place Terminus	Jersey City Ferry	Terminus
