= Paulus Hook =

Neighborhood of Jersey City, New Jersey, U.S.

Coordinates: 40.71685°N 74.03789°W

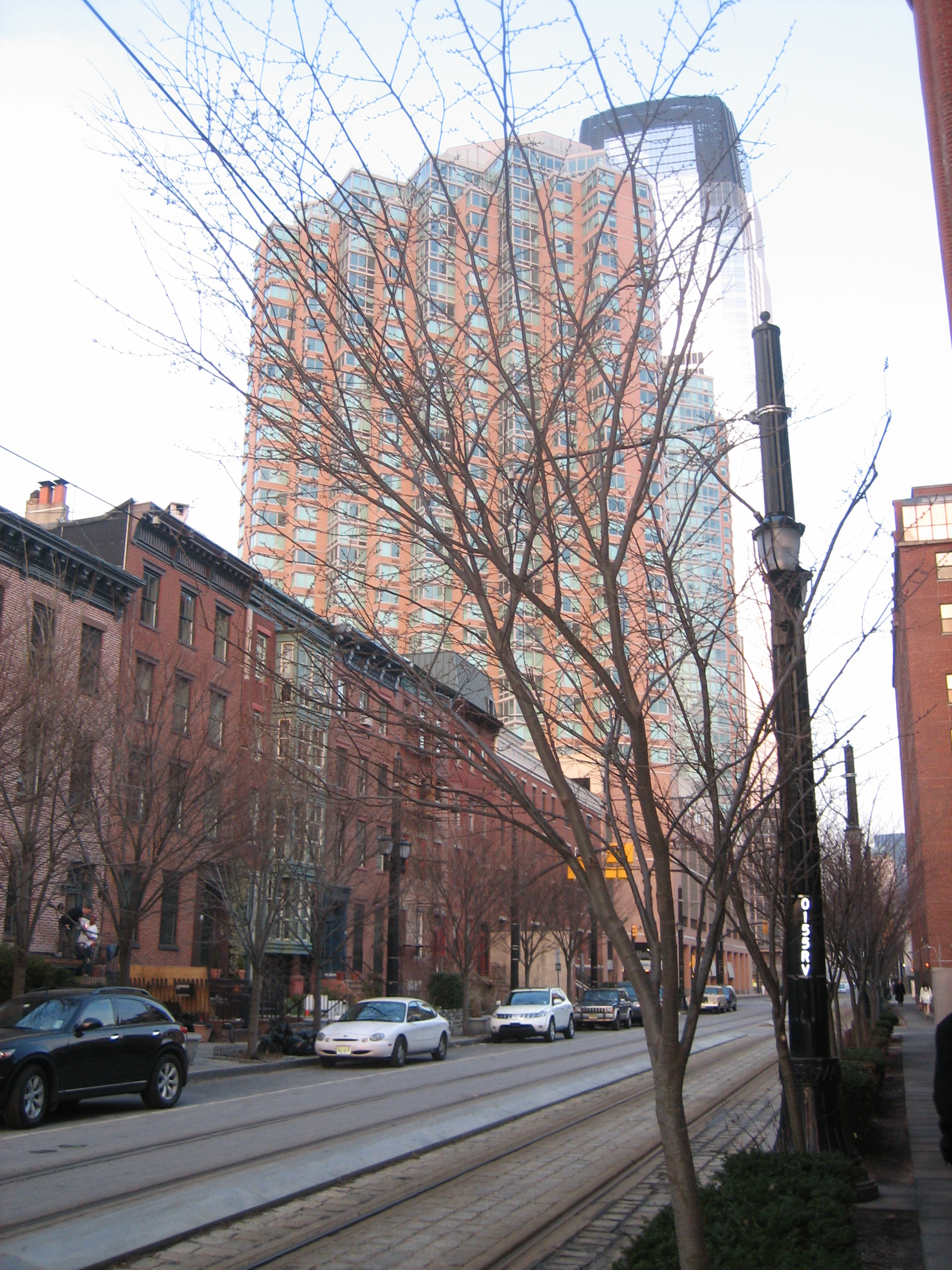
Essex Street in Paulus Hook in April 2006

Paulus Hook is a community on the Hudson River waterfront in Jersey City, New Jersey. It is located one mile (1.5 kilometres) across the river from Manhattan. The name Hook comes from the Dutch word "hoeck", which translates to "point of land." This "point of land" has been described as an elevated area, the location of which today is bounded by Montgomery, Hudson, Dudley, and Van Vorst Streets.

The neighborhood's main street is the north- and south-running Washington Street. The waterfront of Paulus Hook is located along the basin of the Morris Canal in a park with a segment of Liberty State Park. The Hudson-Bergen Light Rail has a Paulus Hook stop at Essex Street and the Liberty Water Taxi at Warren Street. The introduction of the light rail and development of office buildings on the Hudson Waterfront have brought more businesses to Morris Street including a number of restaurants with outdoor seating and small neighborhood shops.

== History ==
=== Settlement ===
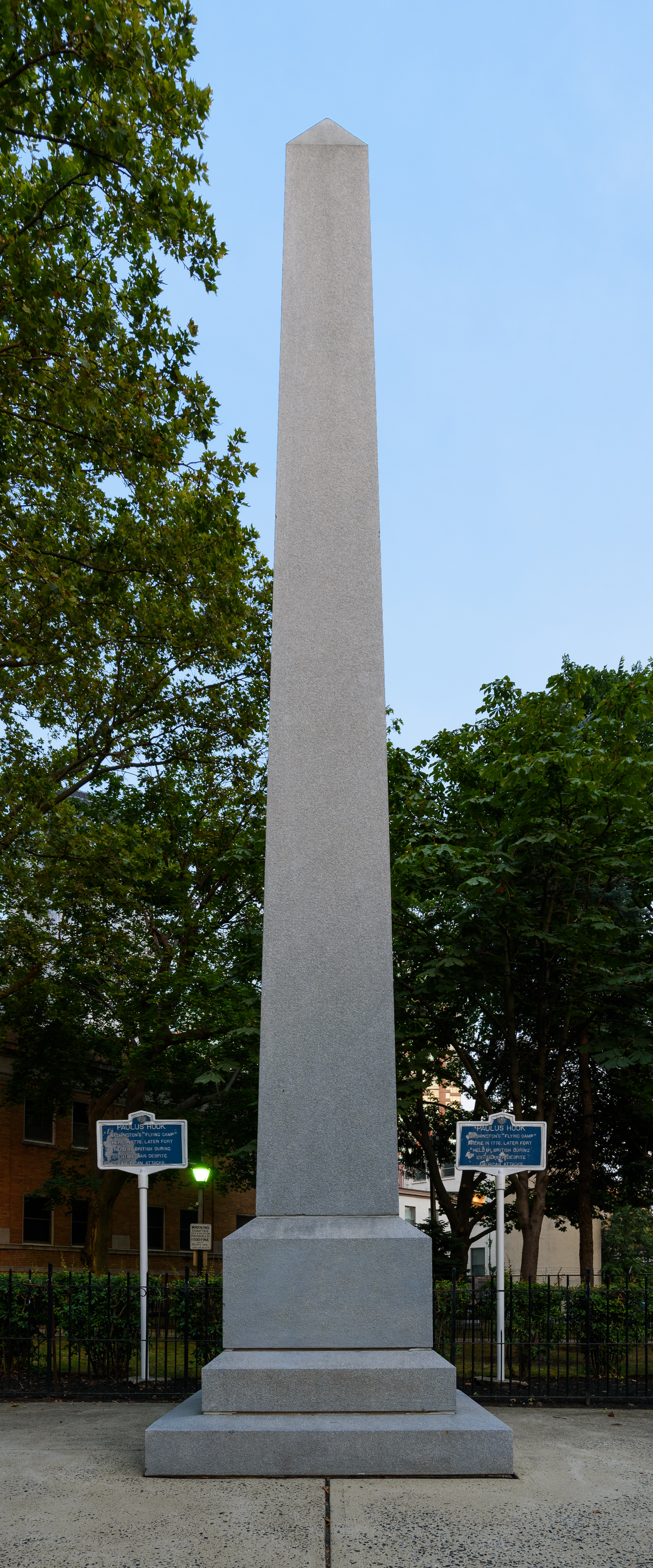
Paulus Hook Monument memorializing Continental Army troops who took part in the Battle of Paulus Hook during the Revolutionary War on August 19, 1779

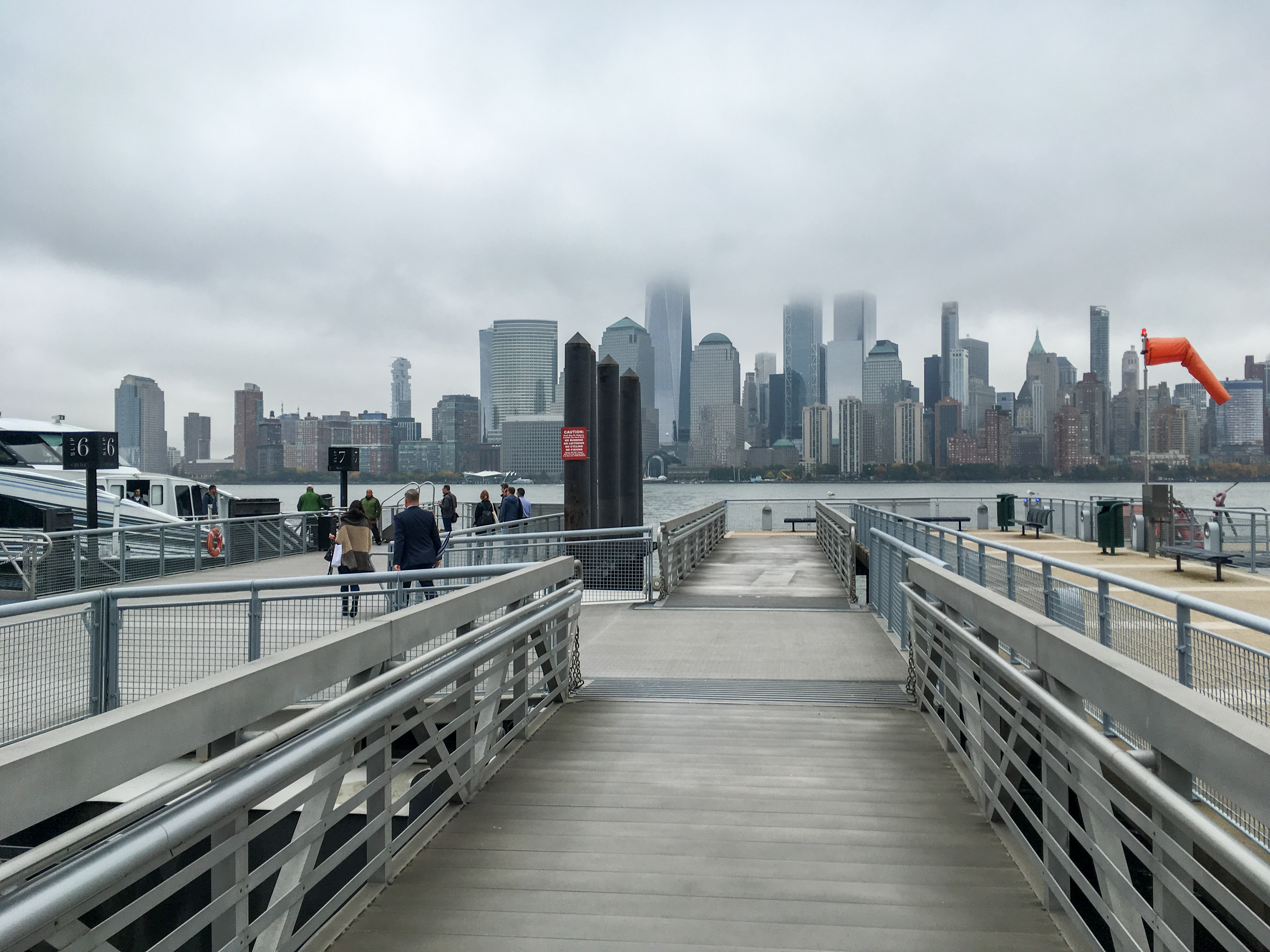
The ferry dock in Paulus Hook

The location that today is Paulus Hook originally was called Arressick or Arisheck Island by the earliest settlers after a corrupted Lenape term, possibly from Kaniskeck, meaning a long, grassy marsh, or meadow.

=== 17th century ===
The location that represents present-day Paulus Hook was originally part of a tract of land purchased as part of Pavonia, New Netherland in 1630 by Michiel Pauw, a Burgomaster and Lord of Achttienhoven originally from Amsterdam.

The first settlement at Paulus Hook was in 1633 when the area was an island at high tide. In 1638, it was granted to Pauw's agent, a man named Micheal Paulez (Pauluson, Powles) who operated an occasional ferry and traded with the local Lenape population. Paulez's name eventually became "Paulus," the name given to the hook jutting into the river and bay. By permission of the Director of New Netherland, Willem Kieft, the land at Paulus Hook was acquired by Abraham Isaacsen Verplanck on May 1, 1638. The Manatus Map of 1639 depicts land holdings in the nascent province; number 31 is described as the "plantations at Paulus Hook",

On February 25, 1643, 100 Native American Indians were massacred at or in the vicinity of Paulus Hook.

Until the American Revolution, the Dutch and then the English governed the site. In 1664, an expedition sailed from England to seize Dutch colonies in the New World. The colony of New Netherland's Director-General Peter Stuyvesant surrendered its capital to the English forces on September 8, 1664, so New Amsterdam became New York City, although the Dutch recaptured it briefly, which served as a trigger event for the Second Anglo-Dutch War in which the Dutch lost their North American territories. Charles II of England awarded territories to his brother James, Duke of York, who later became King James II, and the region between New England and Maryland became proprietary colonies as opposed to a royal colony. James then granted the land between the Hudson River and the Delaware River (the land that would become New Jersey) to two friends who had been loyal through the English Civil War: John Berkeley and George Carteret, who had been with the Duke in exile on Jersey in the Channel Islands. So the name "New Jersey" was chosen, and today the communities of Carteret and Berkeley Heights are also named for the two friends, Elizabeth is named for Carteret's wife, and the Duke of York is himself the namesake of New York.

In 1672, the Third Anglo-Dutch War broke out, and in July 1673, the Dutch reoccupied New York City, renaming it New Orange. Peace was achieved in 1674 under terms of the Treaty of Westminster, and England recovered New York until the American Revolution.

=== 18th century ===
In July 1764, a ferry began operating from Paulus Hook to Mesier's dock which was located at the foot of Courtland Street, where Cortland Street Ferry Depot was later built and where Battery Park City Ferry Terminal is located today.

==== American Revolutionary War ====
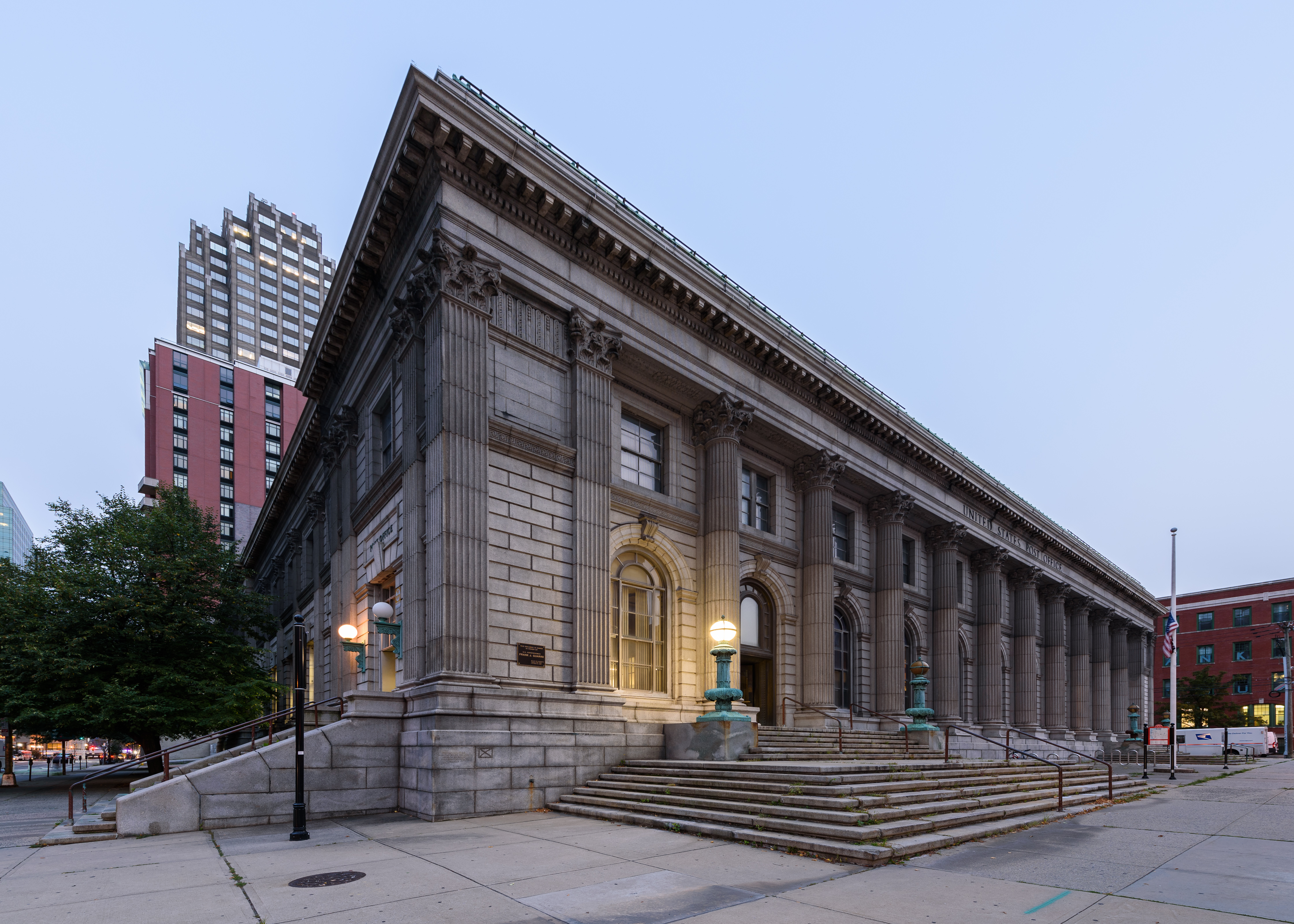
The Paulus Hook post office at 69 Montgomery Street

In 1776, American patriots built several forts to defend the western banks of the Hudson River, one of which was located at Paulus Hook. After suffering defeats in New York City, the American patriots abandoned Paulus Hook and the British occupied it.The fort was a naturally defensible position that guarded the gateway to New Jersey.

In mid-summer 1779, a flamboyant 23-year-old Princeton University graduate, Major Henry Lee, recommended to General George Washington a daring plan for the Continental Army to attack the fort, in what became known as the Battle of Paulus Hook. The assault was planned to begin shortly after midnight on August 19, 1779. Lee led a force of about 300 men, some of whom got lost during the march through the swampy, marshy land. The attack was late getting started but the main contingent of the force was able to reach the fort's gate without being challenged. It is believed that the British mistook the approaching force for allied Hessians returning from patrol, though this has not been definitively documented.

The attacking Patriots succeeded in damaging the fort and took 158 British prisoners, but were unable to destroy the fort and spike its cannons. As daytime arrived, Lee decided that prudent action demanded that the Patriots withdraw before the British forces from New York could cross the river. Paulus Hook remained in British hands until after the war but the battle was a small strategic victory for the forces of independence as it forced the British to abandon their plans for taking rebel positions in the New York area.

On November 22, 1783, the British evacuated Paulus Hook and sailed home. This was three days before they left New York on Evacuation Day, November 25, 1783. While the battle occupies only a small portion of U.S. Revolutionary War history, it is an important part of the history of New Jersey and New Jersey's role in the American Revolution, and holds an even more important place in the history of the neighborhood. A monument was erected in 1903 to memorialize the battle.

=== 19th century ===
Paulus Hook subsequently became a major road and rail head for traffic along the Northeast Corridor and in 1836 a railroad station linking the area to Newark was opened. The Jersey City Ferry, as the original ferry became known, and later the Desbrosses Street Ferry and a ferry to West 34th Street in Manhattan would open and serve the Pennsylvania Railroad's Exchange Place Station. During the mid-20th century the Pennsylvania Railroad's operations shifted to Newark and New York Penn stations and ferry services to Manhattan were discontinued.

=== 20th century ===
Whittier House was founded in 1894 by Cornelia Foster Bradford and named after John Greenleaf Whittier and was the first settlement house in the state.

=== 21st century ===
During the 21st century, the arrival of the Hudson–Bergen Light Rail, a construction boom following the attacks of September 11, investments in Liberty State Park, and major expansion of the area's ferry connections to lower Manhattan, all helped to propel the process of gentrification in the neighborhood.

Today, real estate prices in Paulus Hook are generally higher than in surrounding neighborhoods, which include Liberty Harbor, the Financial District, WALDO, Downtown Jersey City, and Hamilton Park. Morris Street and Washington Street have become the "restaurant rows" of the neighborhood, which is mainly residential. The neighborhood is home to the Historic Paulus Hook Association which was started in 1974 as a neighborhood association dedicated to preserving the historic feel of Paulus Hook.

On October 29, 2012, Paulus Hook was devastated during Hurricane Sandy, with significant flooding occurring throughout the neighborhood.

== See also ==
- Colgate Clock (Jersey City)
