= Desbrosses Street Ferry =

Ferry route across the Hudson River (1862–1930)

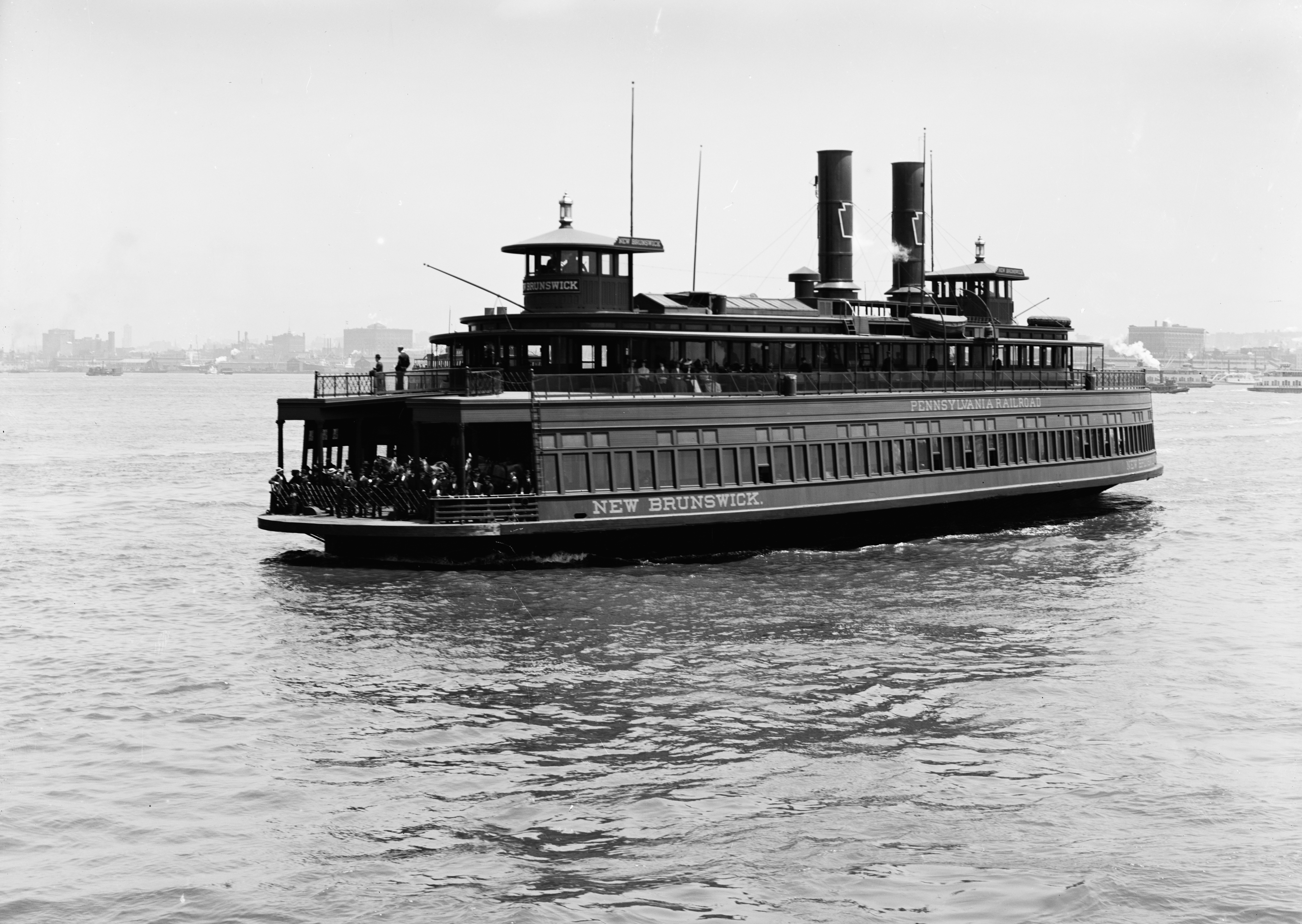
The New Brunswick was one of the Pennsylvania Railroad's ferries across the Hudson, 1905

The Desbrosses Street Ferry was a ferry route across the Hudson River (then called the North River) in the 19th and 20th centuries. It provided passengers with ferry service between the Pennsylvania Railroad's Exchange Place station at Jersey City and Desbrosses Street in lower Manhattan where an elevated railway station at Ninth Avenue was located and where the Metropolitan Crosstown Line provided a connection to the Grand Street Ferry.

== History ==
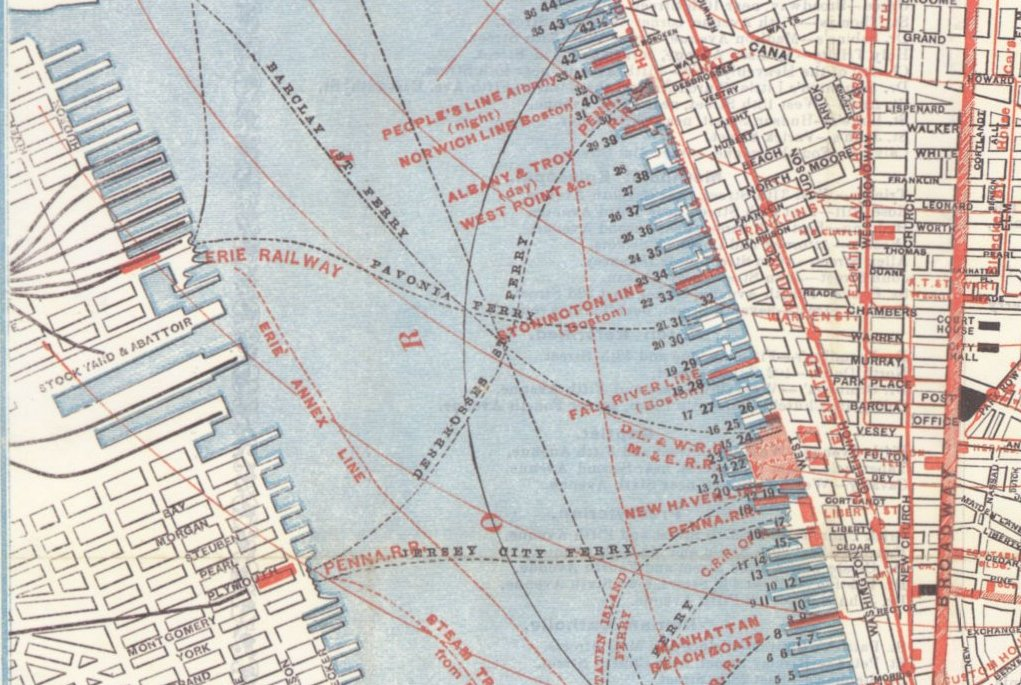
Map from 1879 of the Pennsylvania Railroad's Desbrosses Street Ferry and the Jersey City Ferry routes.

The Desbrosses Street Ferry opened in 1862 and ownership was transferred to the Pennsylvania Railroad in 1871. The ferry's route was longer, more circuitous and in a busier section of the river than most of the other ferries and as a result it suffered several accidents during its nearly 70 years in operation.

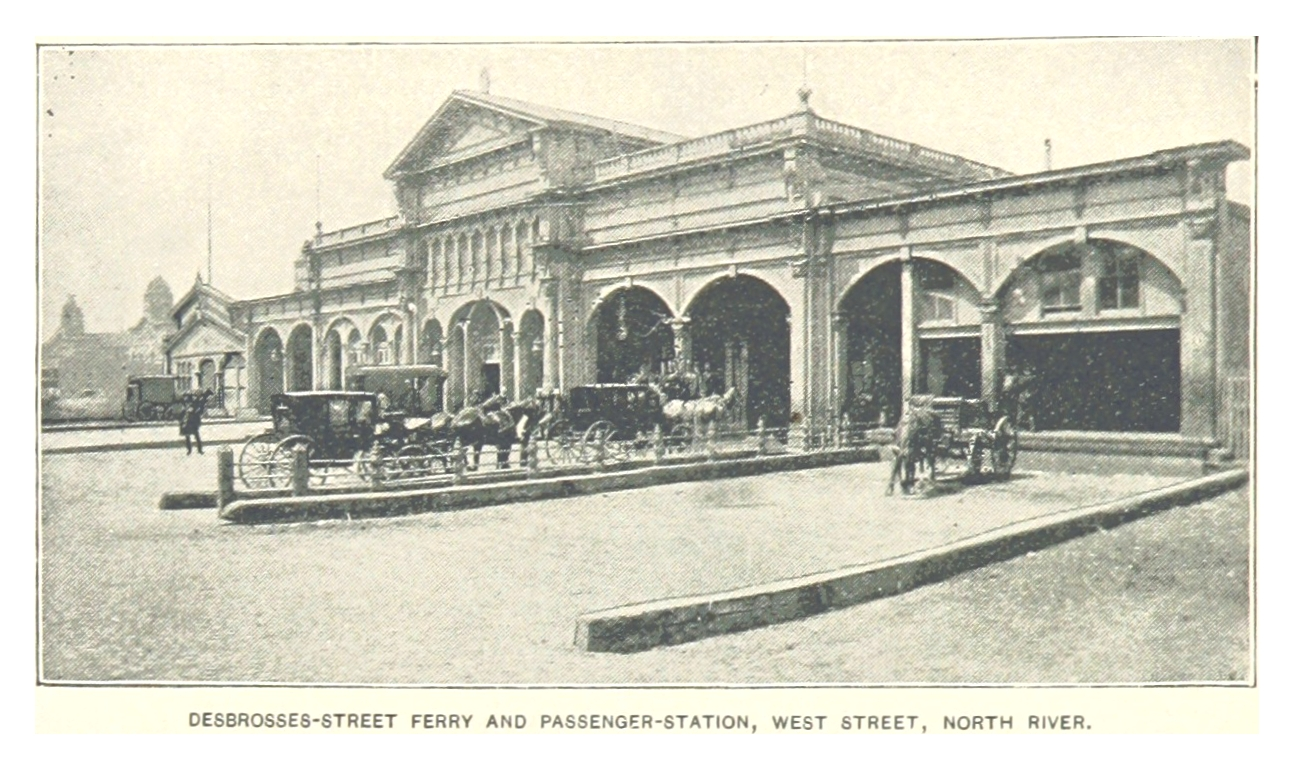
West street façade of the Desbrosses Street Ferry depot, ca.1890

After the Pennsylvania Railroad became the first (and only) mainline railroad to build a tunnel under the Hudson River to Manhattan in 1910, the railroad gradually shifted its services away from its station in Jersey City in favor of its stations in Newark and Manhattan. On January 21, 1930, the ferry ceased operations and passengers were redirected to the railroad's other ferry services across the river.

== See also ==
- Pavonia Ferry
- List of ferries across the Hudson River in New York City
