= Liberty Street Ferry Terminal =

Ferry terminal in Manhattan, New York

Coordinates: 40°42′41″N 74°00′54″W

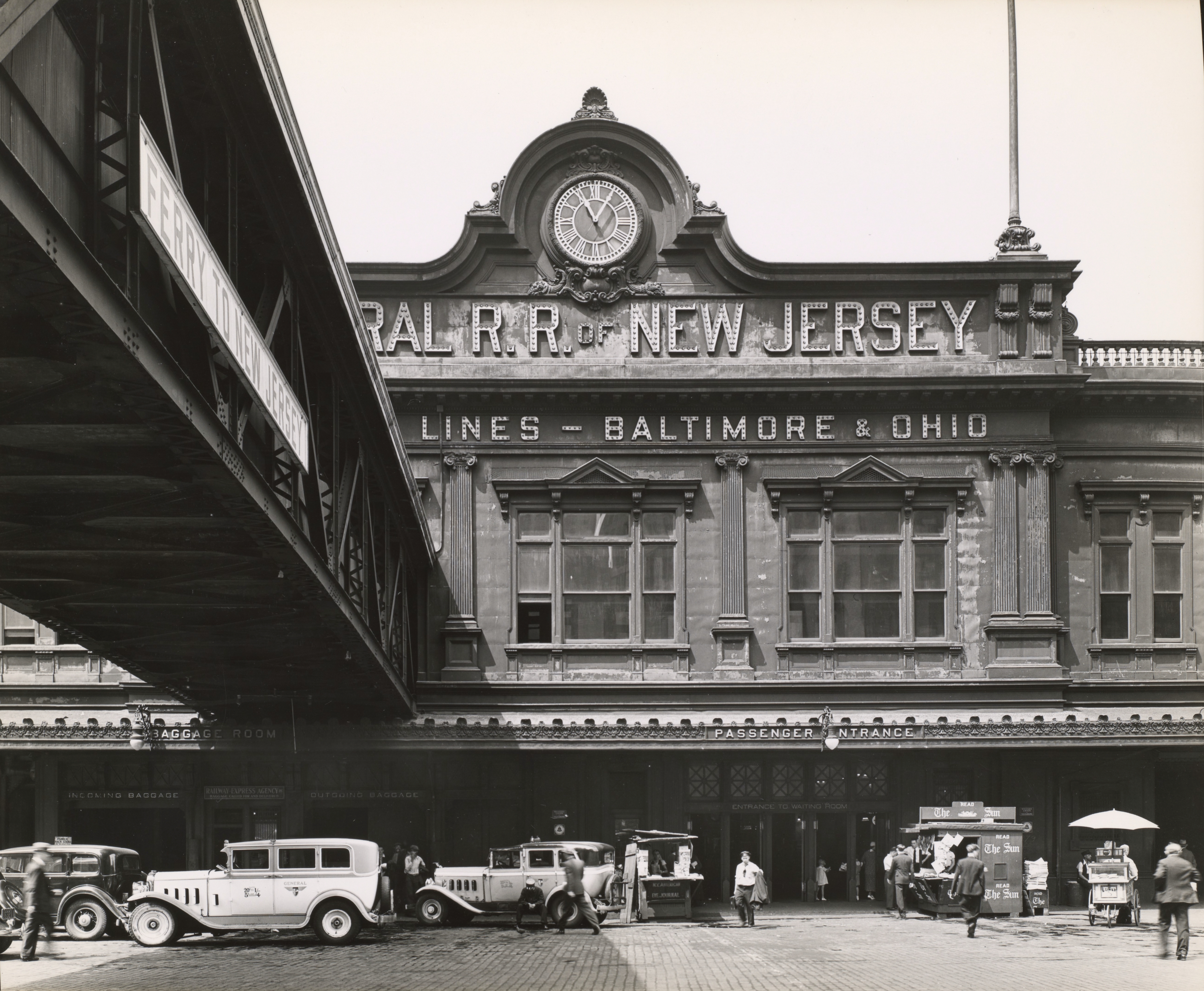
The front facade of Liberty Street Ferry Terminal in 1938

Liberty Street Ferry Terminal or Liberty Street Terminal was the Central Railroad of New Jersey's passenger ferry slip in lower Manhattan, New York City and the point of departure and embarkation for passengers travelling on the Central Railroad of New Jersey, Baltimore and Ohio Railroad, Reading Railroad and the Lehigh Valley Railroad from the Communipaw Terminal across the Hudson River in Jersey City.

== History ==
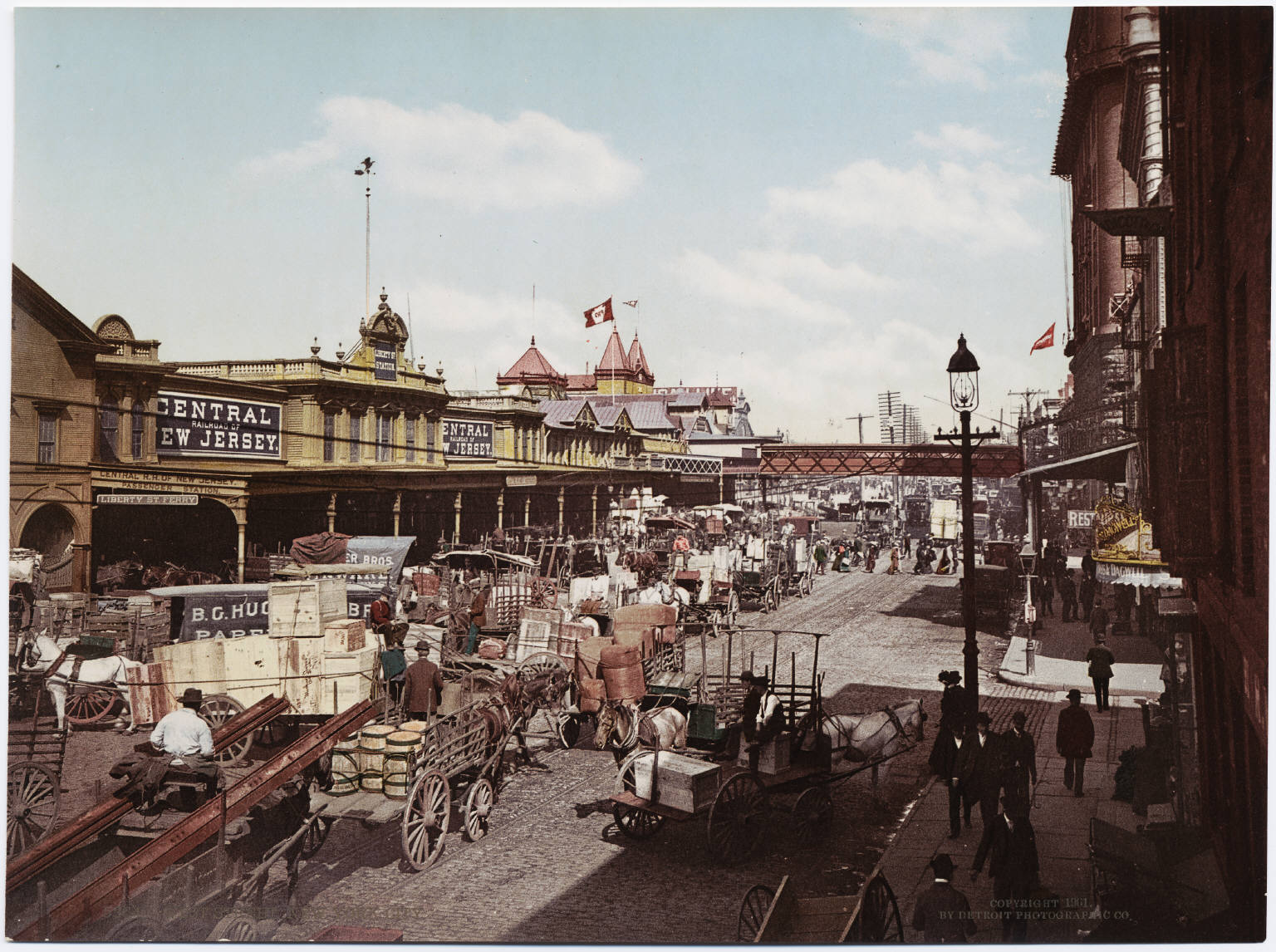
Liberty Street Ferry Terminal, c. 1900

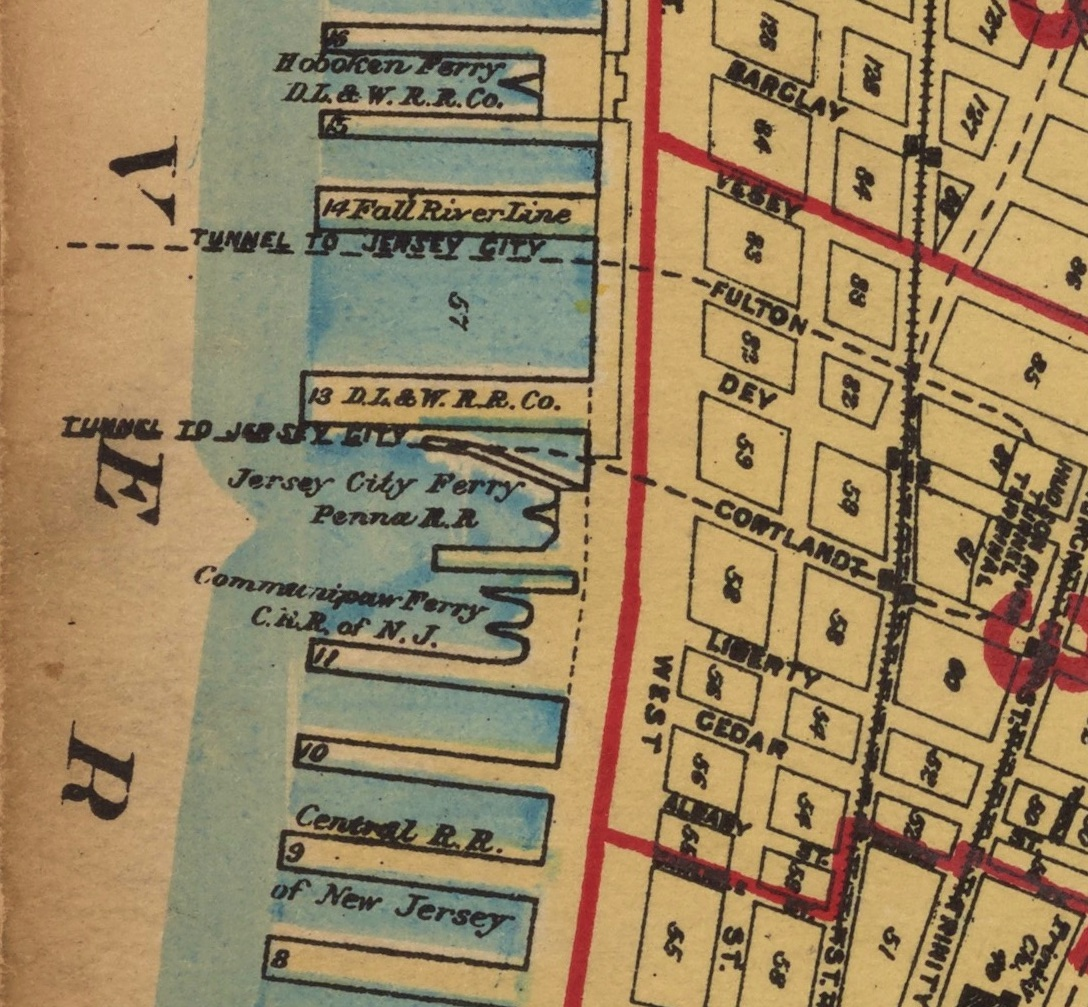
A map of the North River ferry slips in Lower Manhattan, c. 1921–23

Service by the Communipaw ferry dated back to 1661, from the village of Communipaw during the Dutch colonial period.

The terminal opened in 1865 following the completion of the Central Railroad of New Jersey's Communipaw Terminal.

With the construction of the Aldene Connection, the Jersey Central considered the Communipaw service obsolete. The last ferry departed the terminal for Jersey City just after midnight on April 30, 1967, bringing to an end 306 years of Communipaw ferry operations. The terminal was subsequently demolished and the waterfront was filled in to create Battery Park City in the early 1970s.

The Cortland Street Ferry Depot, operated by the Pennsylvania Railroad and the West Shore Railroad, was located directly next to the terminal and also provided ferry service across the North River from lower Manhattan to their railroad terminals at Exchange Place and Weehawken, respectively. The terminal was located one block west of the Ninth Avenue Elevated's Cortland Street Station which operated from 1874 until 1940.

During the 1980s, ferry service across the Hudson was restored by NY Waterway and it has subsequently been expanded. Today the Battery Park City Ferry Terminal is located a few blocks north of where Liberty Street Ferry Terminal and Cortland Street Ferry Depot once stood.

== See also ==
- Battery Park City Ferry Terminal
- Chambers Street Ferry Terminal
- Cortland Street Ferry Depot
- Whitehall Terminal

== Gallery ==
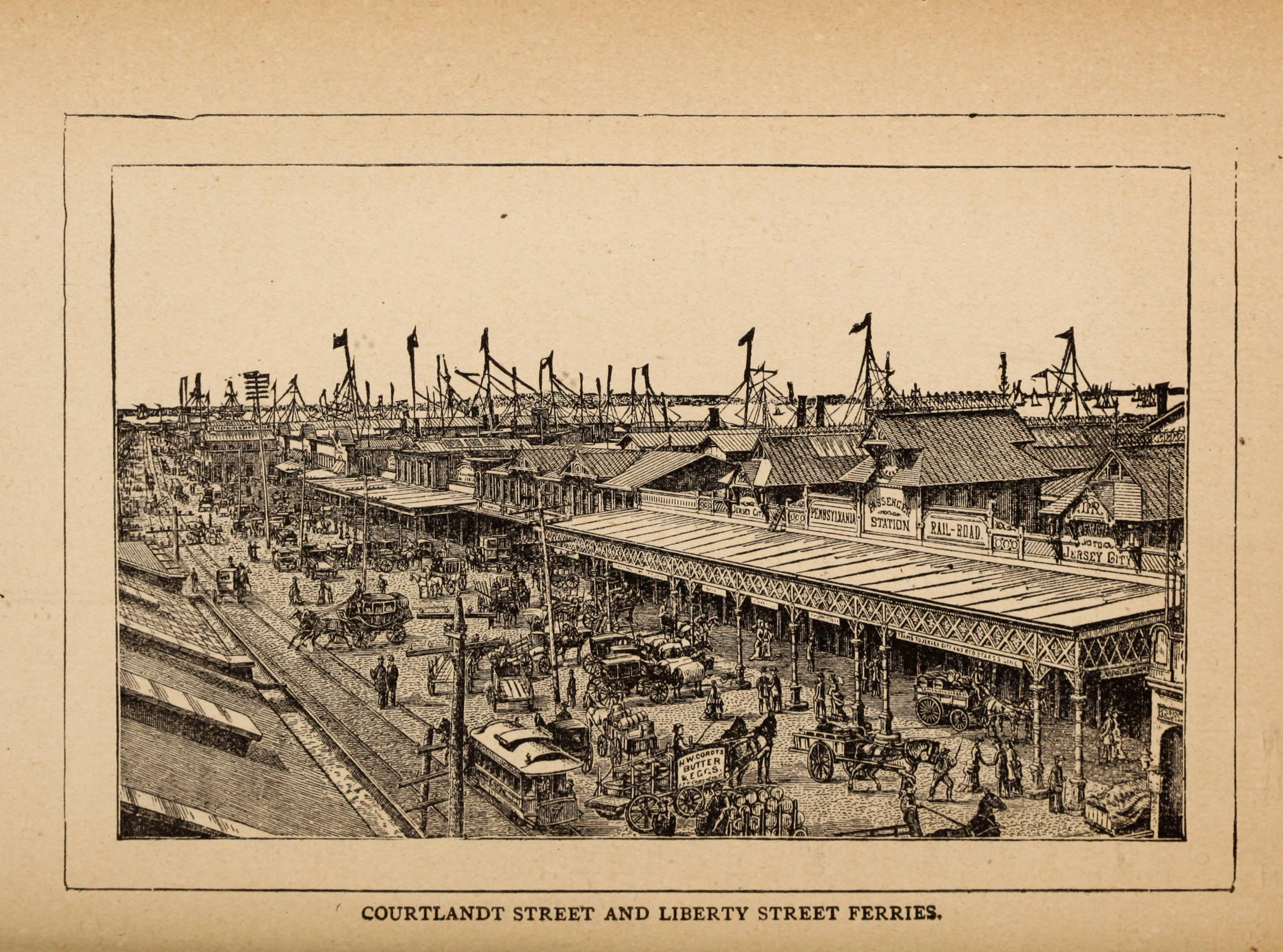
Cortland and Liberty Street Ferries, ca. 1882

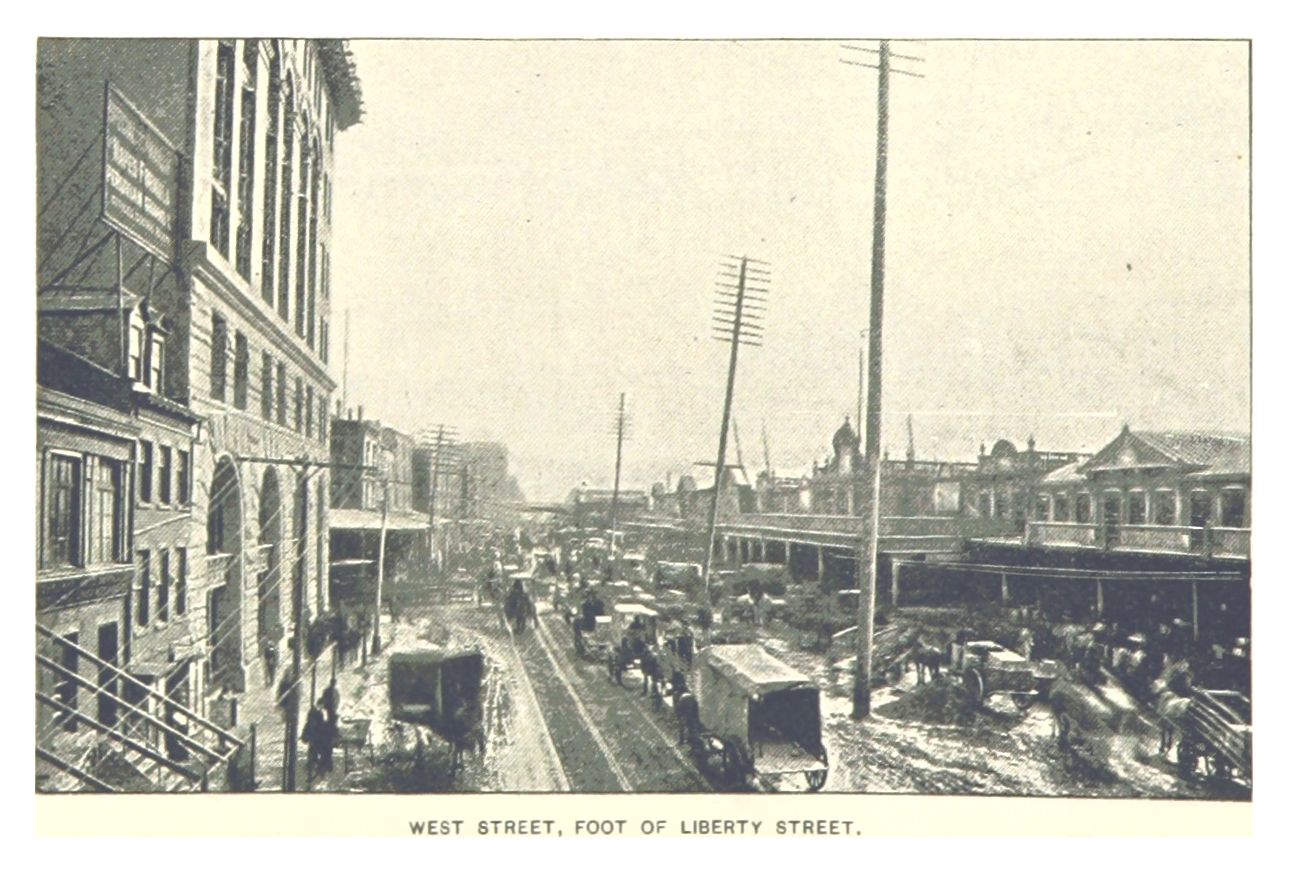
A crowded scene in front of the ferry terminal, 1893

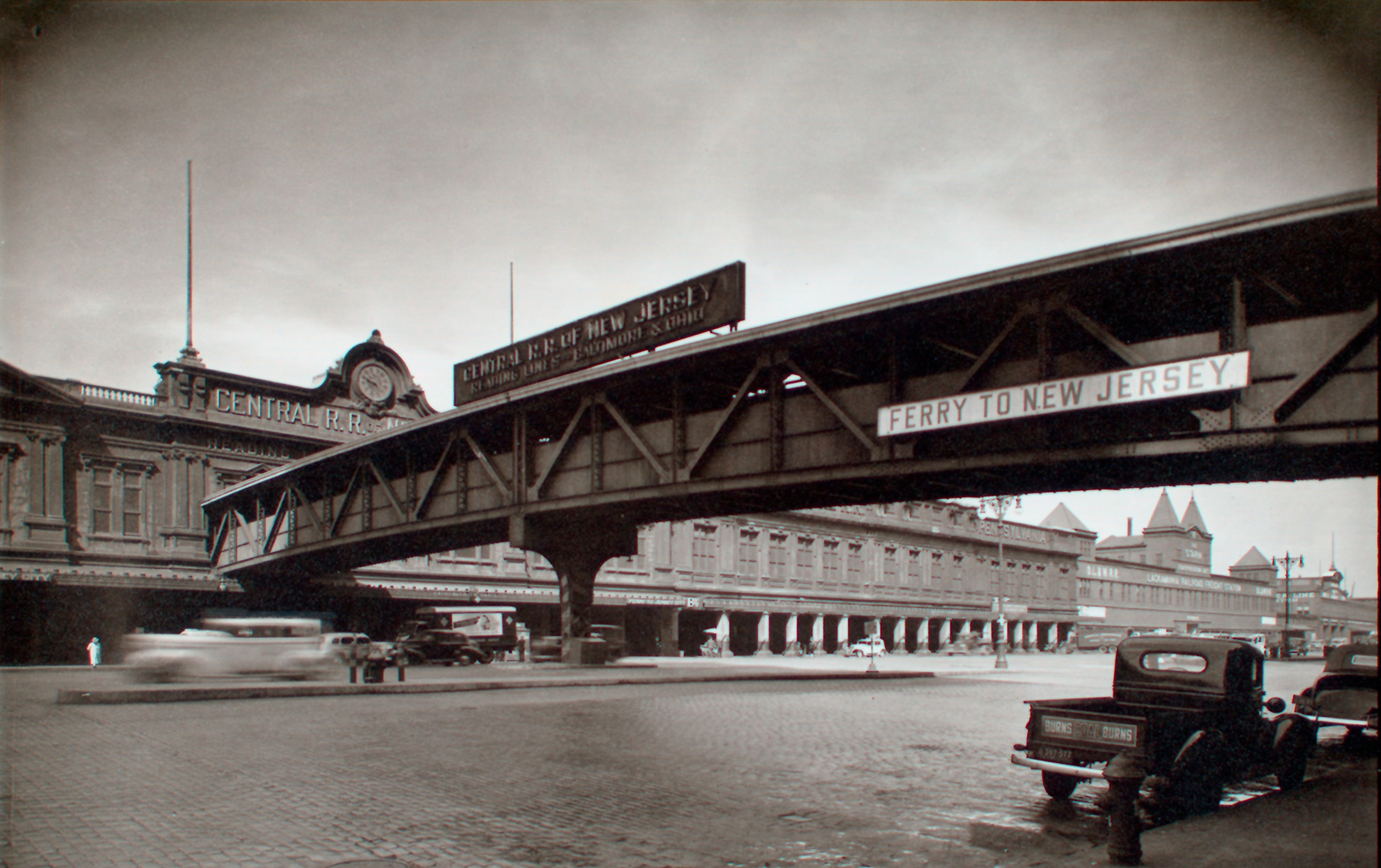
A pedestrian overpass at Liberty Street Ferry Terminal in 1938

Preceding station	Central Railroad of New Jersey	Following station
Jersey City Terminus	Communipaw Ferry	Terminus
