= Communipaw Ferry =

Major ferry service from New Jersey and New York

The Communipaw Ferry was a major ferry service that operated between the village of Communipaw (in what would become Jersey City, New Jersey) and Lower Manhattan, New York. The ferry began operations in 1661 after the Colonial Dutch administrators of New Amsterdam granted a charter to operate the ferry. soon after the establishment of Bergen atop Bergen Hill. It was the first reported ferry service established across the Hudson River and it remained active up until 1783 when New York City was captured by the British.

Communipaw Ferry also refers to Central Railroad of New Jersey service between Communipaw Terminal in Jersey City and Liberty Street Ferry Terminal in Manhattan.

== See also ==
- Jersey City Ferry
- List of ferries across the Hudson River to New York City
- List of fixed crossings of the Hudson River
- North River
- Port of New York and New Jersey
- Timeline of Jersey City area railroads
