= Exchange Place station (Pennsylvania Railroad) =

Former intermodal terminal in Jersey City (closed 1961)

Jersey City
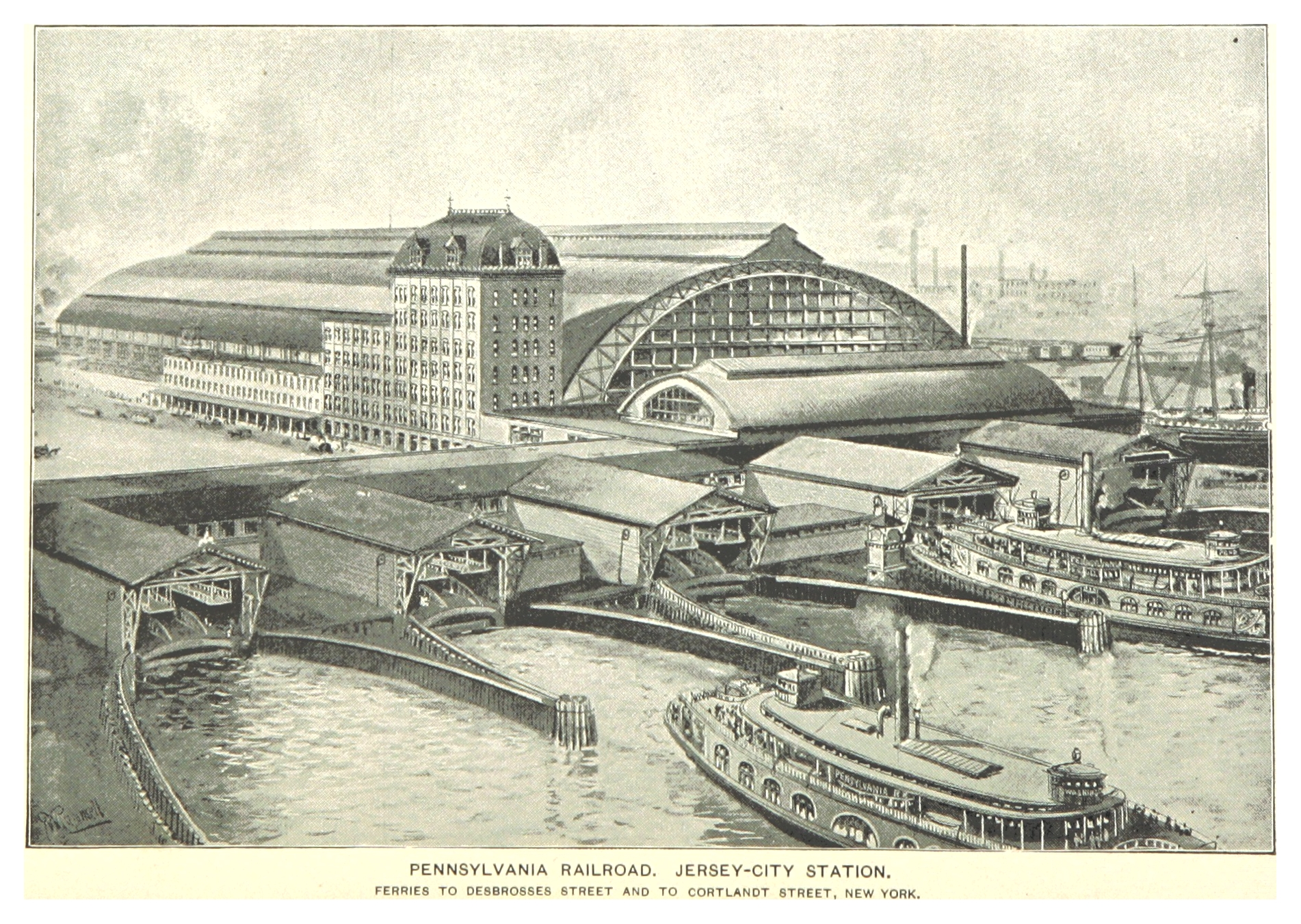
- Pennsylvania Railroad's Jersey City Station, 1893

General information
- Coordinates: 40.71648°N 74.03238°W
- Operator: Pennsylvania Railroad (PRR)
- Connections: US Passenger rail transport ferry/water interchange

History
- Opened: 1834
- Closed: 1961

Former services
Preceding station	Pennsylvania Railroad	Following station
Terminus	Jersey City Ferry	Cortlandt Street Terminus
Manhattan Transfer (Note: Manhattan Transfer was closed 1937; previous station post-1937 is Newark Penn Station) toward Chicago	Main Line	Terminus
Marion toward New Brunswick	New Brunswick Line	Terminus
Preceding station	Lehigh Valley Railroad	Following station
Manhattan Transfer toward Buffalo	Main Line Until 1913	Terminus
Location

The Pennsylvania Railroad Station was the intermodal passenger terminal for the Pennsylvania Railroad's (PRR) vast holdings on the Hudson River and Upper New York Bay in Jersey City, New Jersey. By the 1920s the station was called Exchange Place. The rail terminal and its ferry slips were the main New York City station for the railroad until the opening in 1910 of New York Pennsylvania Station, made possible by the construction of the North River Tunnels. It was one of the busiest stations in the world for much of the 19th century.

The terminal was on Paulus Hook, which in 1812 became the landing of the first steam ferry service in the world, and to which rail service began in 1834. Train service to the station ended in November 1961 and demolition of the complex was completed in 1963. Part of the former terminal complex is now the PATH system's Exchange Place Station while the Harborside Financial Center was built upon part of the old site.

The station was one of five passenger railroad terminals on the western shore of the Hudson River during the 19th and 20th centuries, the others being Weehawken, Hoboken, Pavonia, and Communipaw, with Hoboken being the only station still in use.

The PRR referred to the location simply as "Jersey City," and if necessary to distinguish it from other railroads' terminals, as the Pennsylvania station.

== History ==
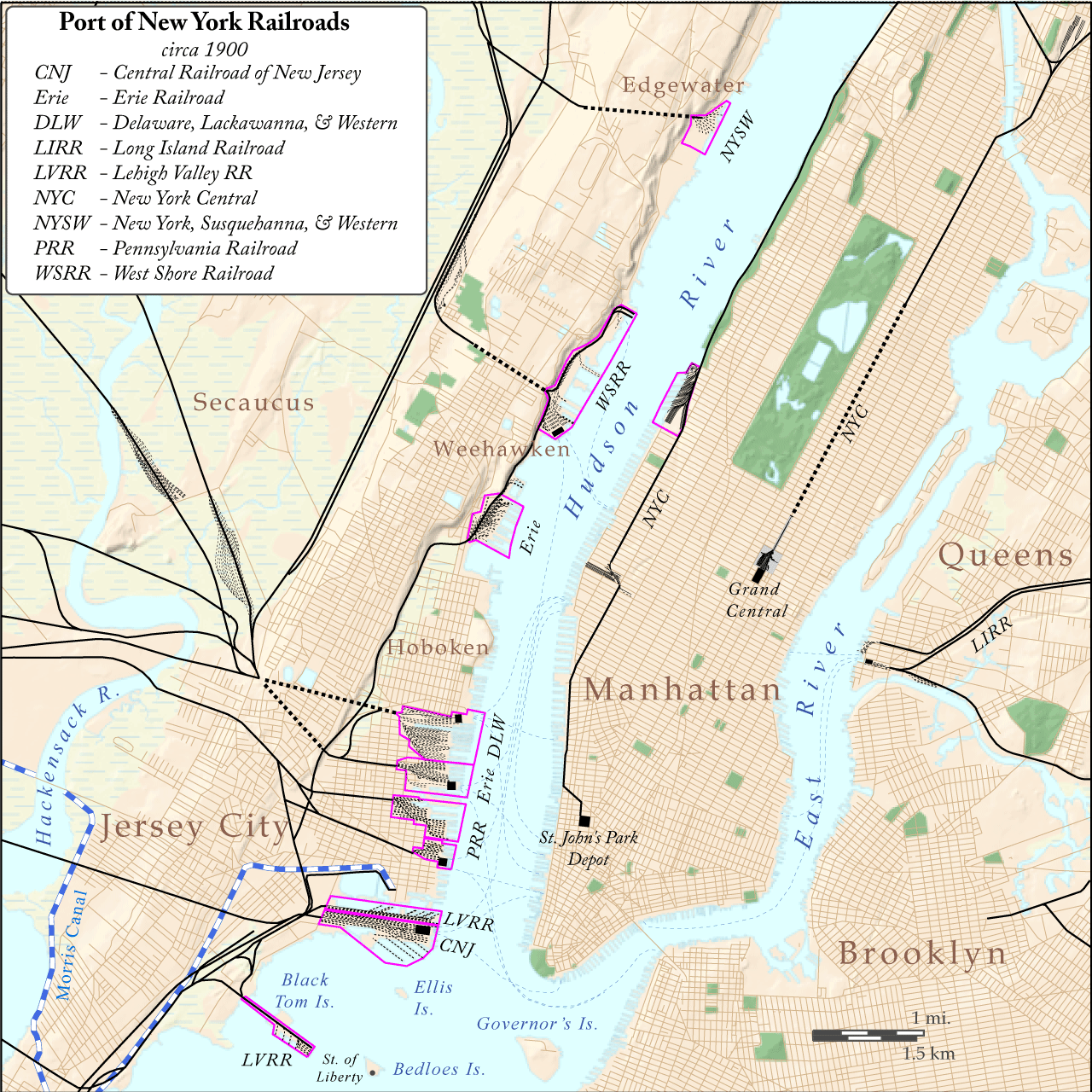
Map of the five train-to-ferry transfer points along the west shore of the Hudson River circa 1900

As early as July 1764 a ferry began operating from Paulus Hook to the foot of Courtland Street (where Cortland Street Ferry Depot would be built). The first steam ferry service in the world began between Paulus Hook and Manhattan in 1812, and the New Jersey Rail Road and Transportation Company opened a rail line from Newark to Paulus Hook, then part of the newly incorporated City of Jersey, in 1834. The PRR acquired the railroad in 1871 and replaced the terminal in 1876 and yet again in 1888-1892. Competition along the Northeast Corridor between New York City, Philadelphia, Baltimore and Washington, principally between the PRR and Baltimore and Ohio Railroad, was fierce. These railroads both used terminals in Jersey City, there being no tunnels or bridges to Manhattan, and for much of the 19th century, Exchange Place was one of the busiest rail stations in the world.

At Exchange Place passengers could move between the trains and ferries without going outside, and crossed the river on the Jersey City Ferry to Cortland Street Ferry Depot in lower Manhattan, to 34th Street in Midtown Manhattan or via the Desbrosses Street Ferry which connected to the Metropolitan Crosstown Line and the Ninth Avenue Elevated at Desbrosses St. Another ferry to the Fulton Ferry slip in Brooklyn also existed.

In the 1870s the PRR began exploring ways to reach New York directly (see New York Tunnel Extension). A number of realignments produced a straighter track, with the final realignment, a new passenger line from Harrison to east of the new bridge (now the PATH Lift Bridge) over the Hackensack River, opening in 1900. (The old freight line still exists as part of the Passaic and Harsimus Line.)

In 1910 the PRR opened New York Penn Station in Manhattan. The new station used the North River Tunnels under the Hudson River to reach New York City, enabling direct rail access to New York City from the south for the first time. Penn Station's opening led to sharply reduced PRR traffic at Exchange Place. On October 1, 1911 the Hudson and Manhattan Railroad, a rapid transit system (now called Port Authority Trans Hudson or PATH), began running over the PRR line west of Waldo Yard, connecting with the new Manhattan Transfer station at Harrison. The Lehigh Valley Railroad, which had operated its Black Diamond train from Buffalo, New York since 1896, ended service to Exchange Place in 1913. Ferry service at Exchange Place ended in 1949. The last PRR passenger train used the branch on November 17, 1961. The PATH continues to use the line through Bergen Hill to the Journal Square Transportation Center and onward to Newark Penn Station.

The Exchange Place terminal fell into disuse. The last of the buildings of the complex, along with the elevated portion of the rail line, were demolished in 1963. The former terminal complex is now split between the PATH system's Exchange Place station and the Harborside Financial Center, while the ferry slips have been replaced with J. Owen Grundy Waterfront Park. Hudson-Bergen Light Rail maintains two stations in the district while ferries are now served by the Paulus Hook Ferry Terminal. The trestle carrying PRR tracks above what is now Christopher Columbus Drive between Exchange Place and Waldo Yard was removed.

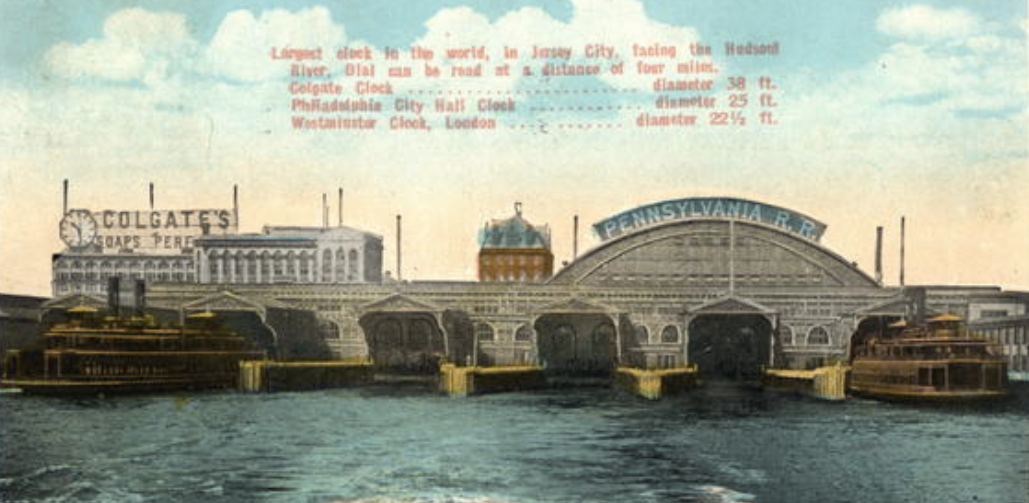
View from the Hudson, 1920s

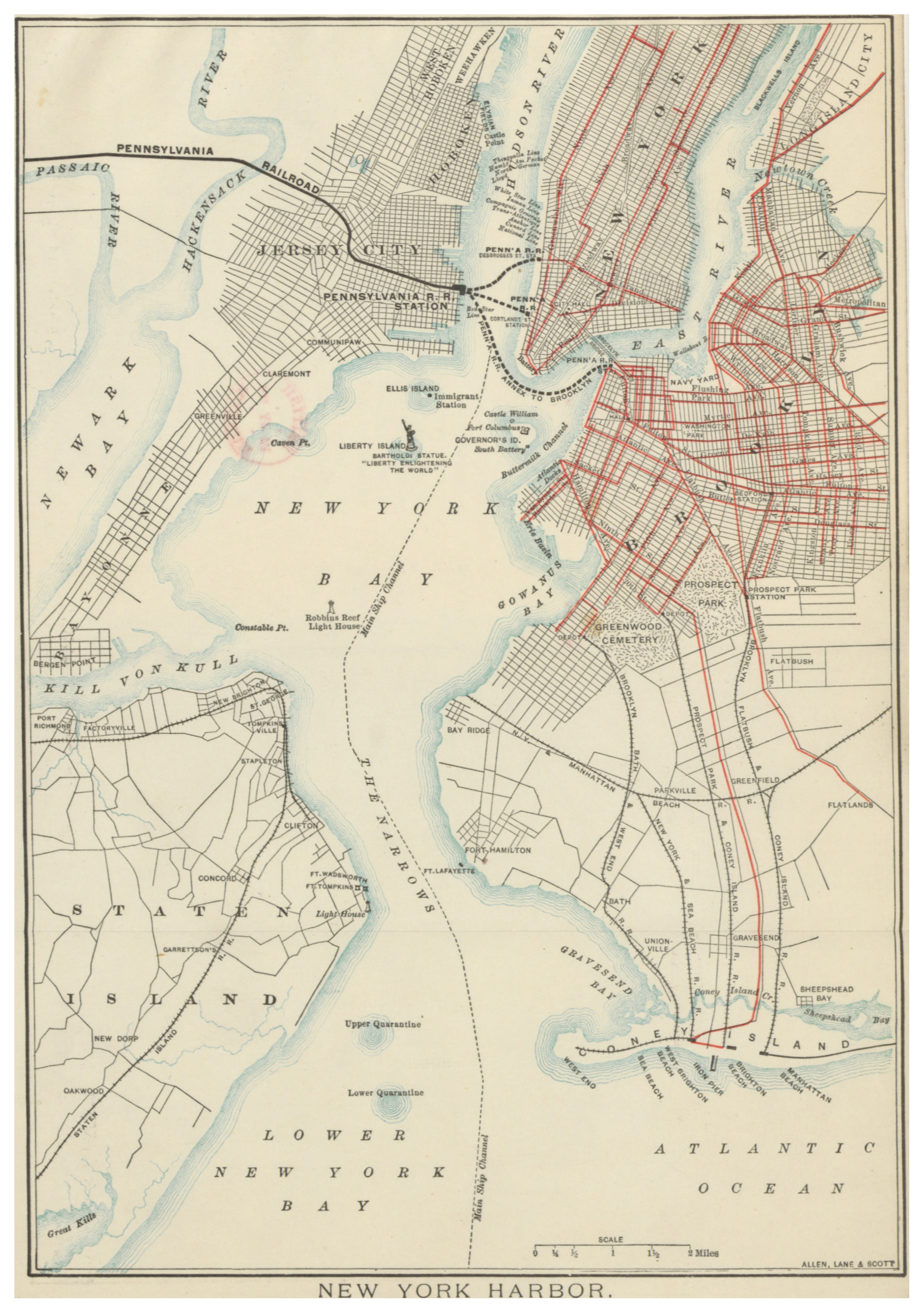
PRR route to the terminal

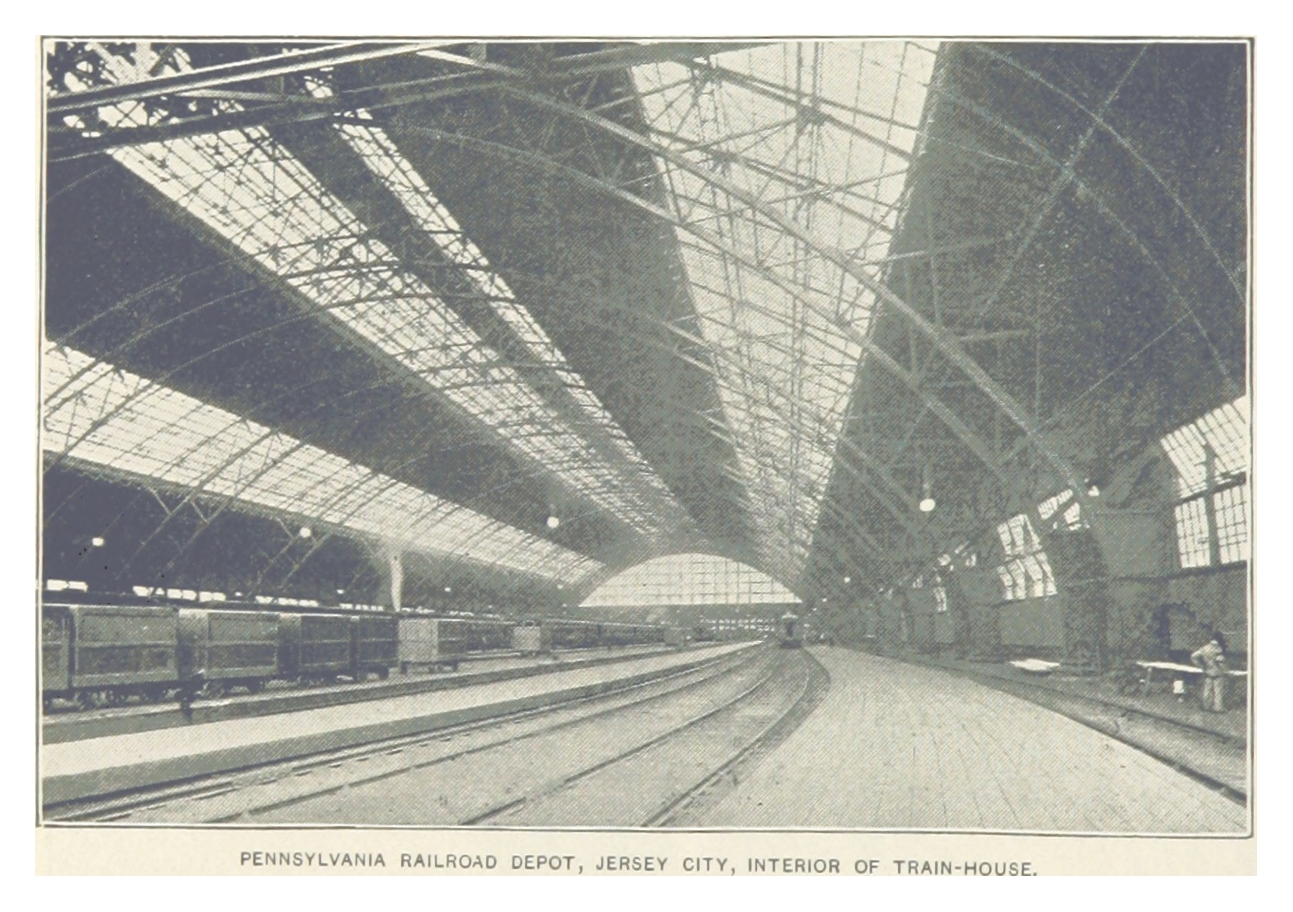
The interior of the station's train house

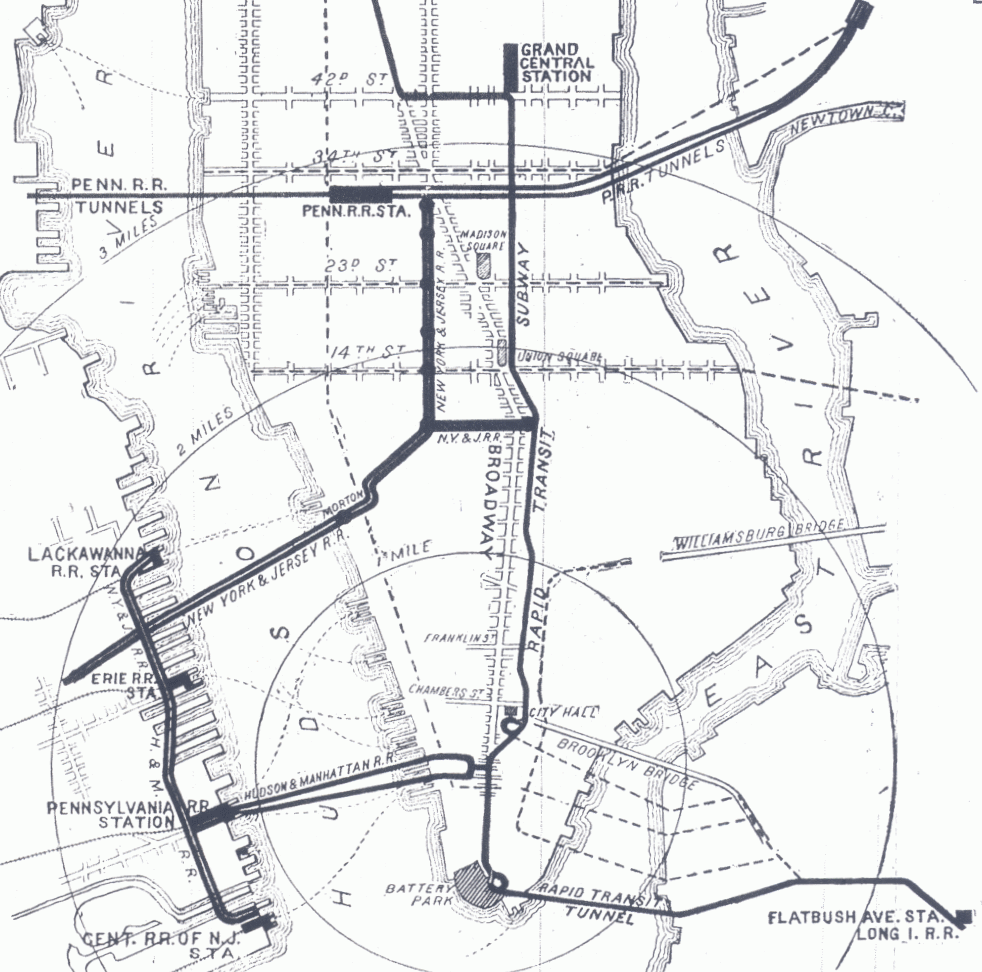
The original Hudson and Manhattan Railroad plan. Local usage eventually led both the terminal and the H&M station to be known as Exchange Place

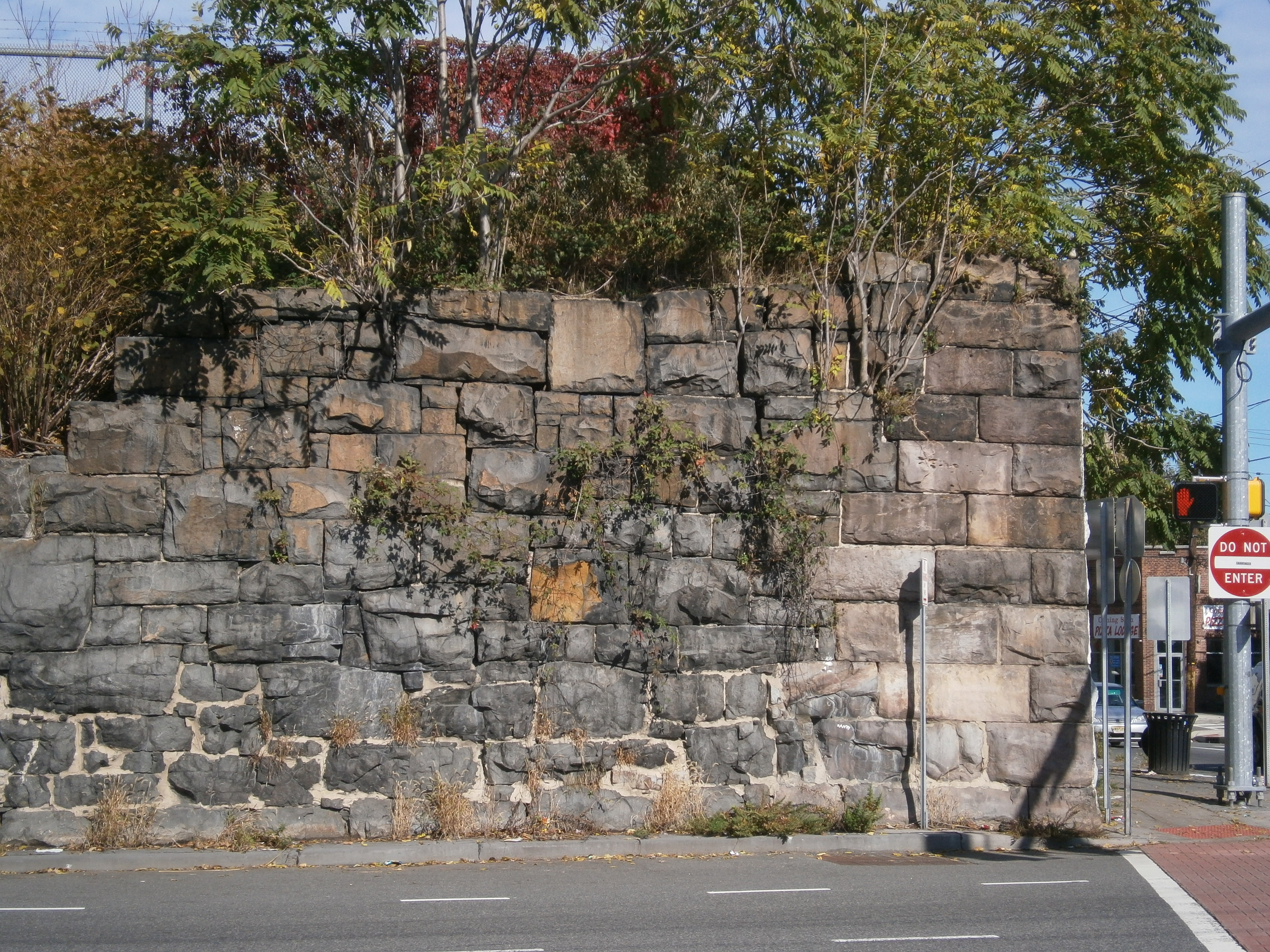
Elevated trestle along ROW met embankment at Waldo Yard

== See also ==
- Exchange Place (Jersey City) § History
- Exchange Place station (Hudson–Bergen Light Rail)
- Exchange Place station (PATH)
- Harsimus Stem Embankment
- List of ferries across the Hudson River to New York City
- List of historical passenger rail services serving New York City
- Timeline of Jersey City area railroads
