= Jersey City Ferry =

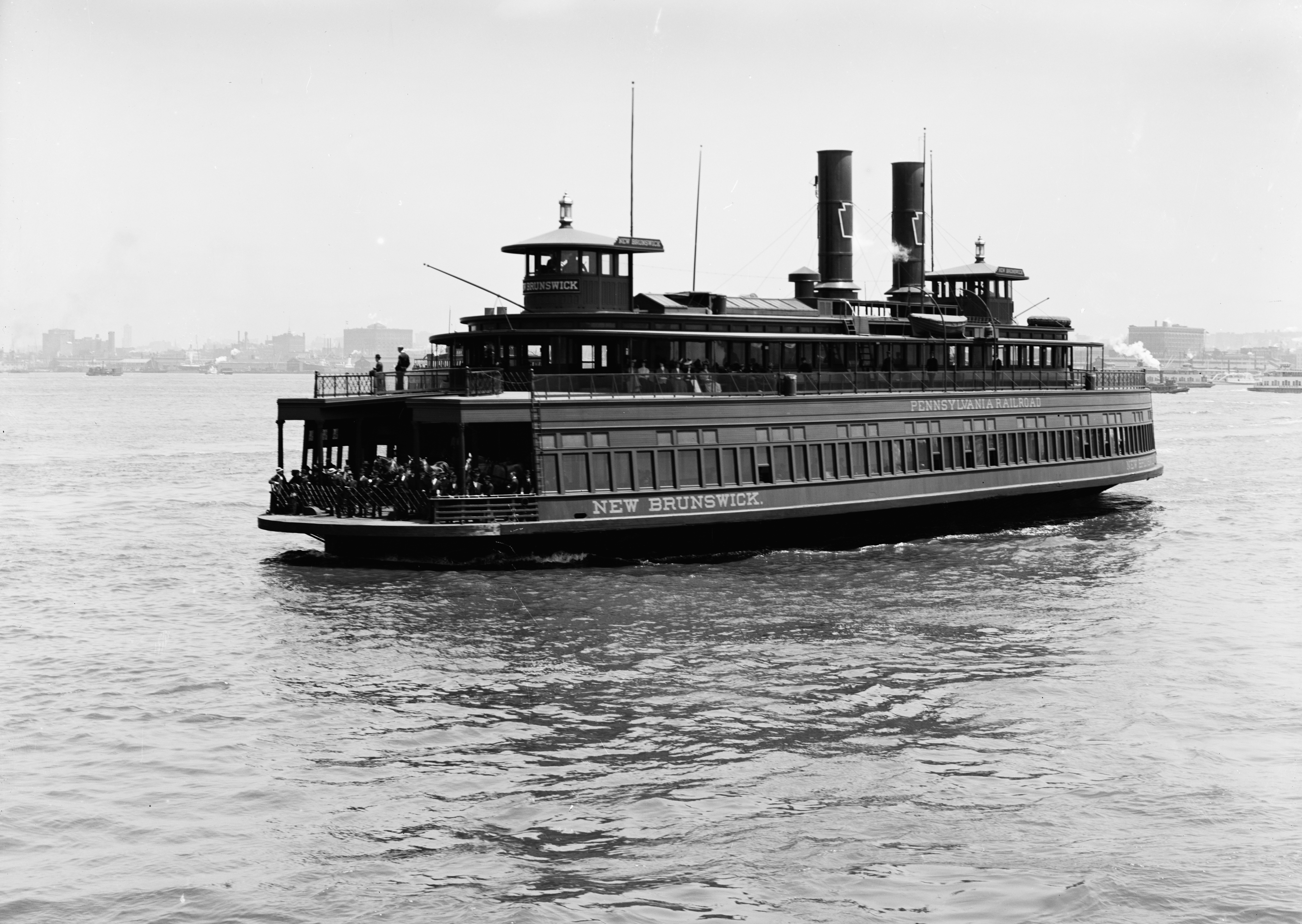
The New Brunswick, one of the Pennsylvania Railroad's ferries across the Hudson, ca. 1905

The Jersey City Ferry was a major ferry service that operated between Jersey City in New Jersey and Cortlandt Street in lower Manhattan for almost 200 years (1764-1949). The ferry was notable for being the first to use steam power which began in 1812. The ferry's history was closely tied to the Pennsylvania Railroad's station in Jersey City at Exchange Place, which gradually fell into disuse after the railroad opened the North River Tunnels and Penn Station in 1910. Ferry service from lower Manhattan to Jersey City continued via the even older Communipaw ferry which operated from the adjacent Liberty Street Ferry Terminal until this service was also discontinued in 1967. In 1986 ferry service was revived and today it is operated by New York Waterway.

== History ==
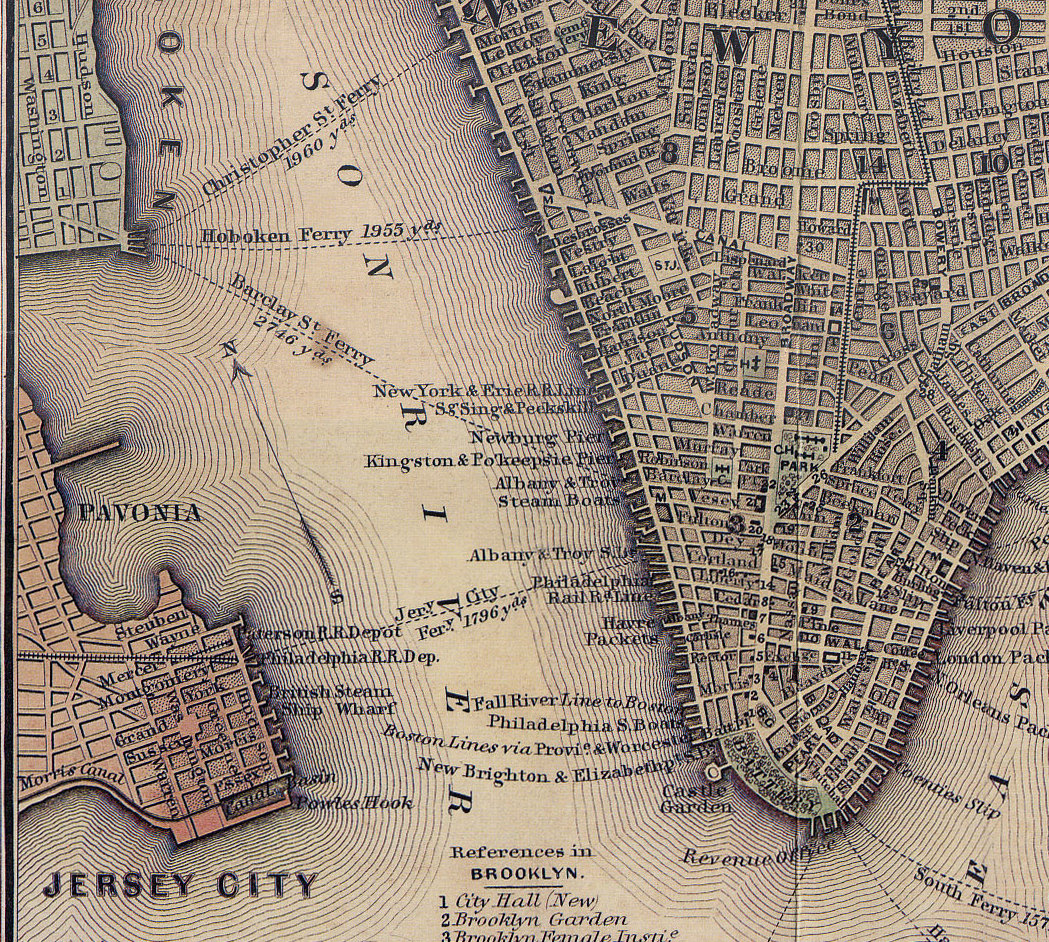
Map from 1847 showing the Jersey City Ferry's route as well as several Hoboken ferry services.

While the Communipaw ferry dated back to 1661 during the Dutch colonial period in New Amsterdam, the Jersey City ferry, then called the Paulus Hook ferry, began in July 1764 and operated from Paulus Hook to Mesier's dock at the foot of Courtland Street (where Cortland Street Ferry Depot would later be built). Almost immediately and for several decades subsequently, a complicated series of legal battles broke out over who should operate the ferry, where the crossing(s) should be located and at what rate passengers and other cargo should be charged for the journey.

In 1804, the Associates of the Jersey Company was formed to operate the ferries. This company was leased by the United New Jersey Railroad and Canal Company (and by extension the Pennsylvania Railroad) in 1875, making it the oldest corporation in the PRR proper.

The first steam ferry service in the world began in 1812 between Paulus Hook and Manhattan and reduced the journey time to a then remarkable 14 minutes (today's service is scheduled to take 13 minutes).

In 1834 a railroad station was built at Paulus Hook and on October 14, 1836 the Morris and Essex Railroad began operating services to Newark and points west from the station. Subsequent expansions of rail service led to an ever increasing demand for the ferry's passenger and cargo service during the 19th century.

Upon completion of the North River Tunnels and Penn Station in 1910, passengers increasingly opted to avoid using Exchange Place Terminal and the ferry's passenger traffic declined. Service to West 32nd Street ended the same year, and service to Desbrosses street ended in 1932. In 1949 the final ferry service was made and passengers wanting to travel from Exchange Place to lower Manhattan were left with only the Downtown Hudson Tubes of the Hudson & Manhattan Railroad (now PATH) as a form of direct travel.
