= Nungessers =

Junction in northeastern New Jersey, US

Coordinates: 40.809684°N 74.001235°W

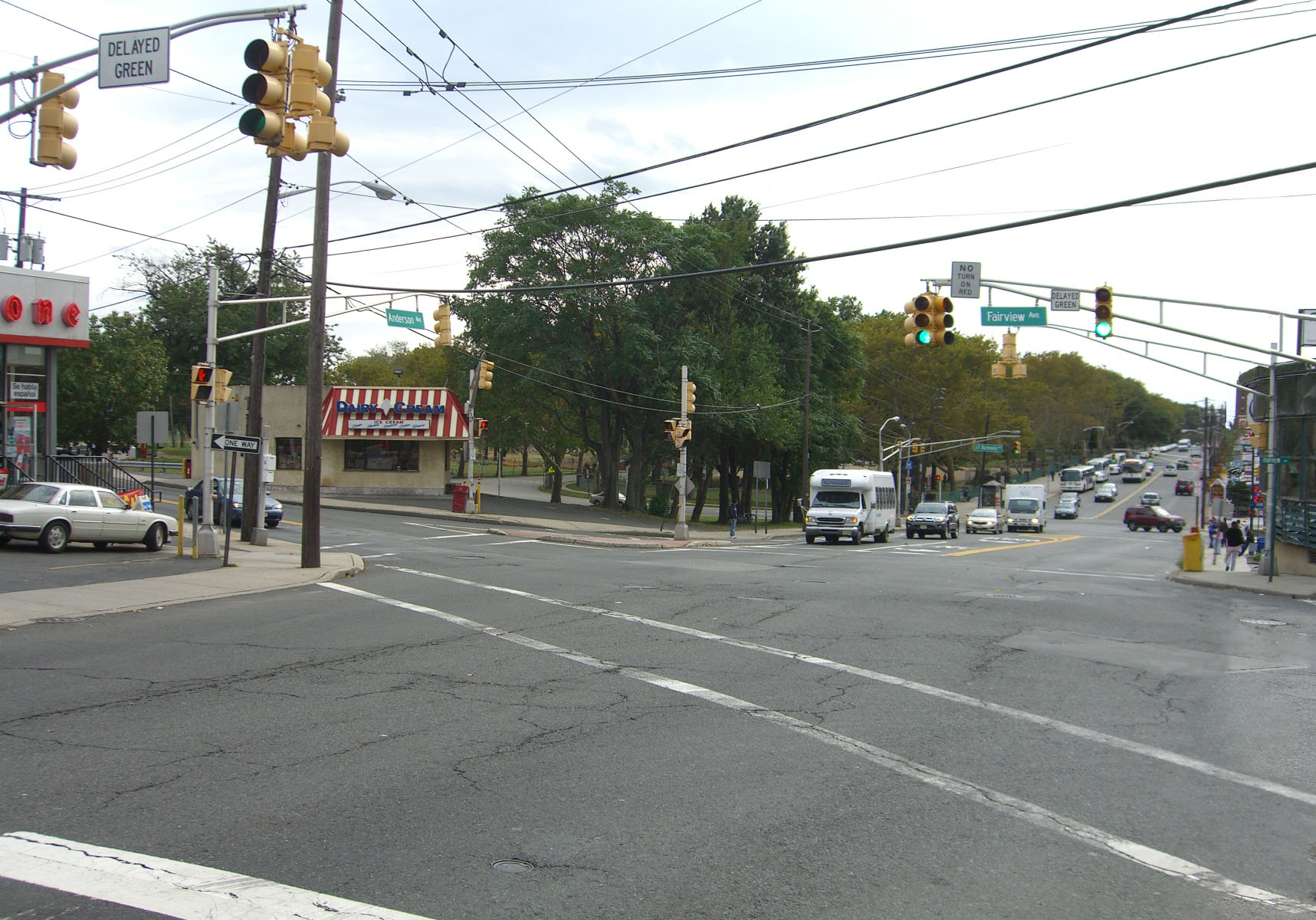
Woodcliff, Fairview, Anderson Avenue and Bergenline Avenue, at the Bergen-Hudson county line

Nungessers is a confluence of roads at the Hudson and Bergen county line at North Bergen and Fairview in northeastern New Jersey. The area is the former site of the Nungesser's Gutenberg Racetrack, a late 19th-century gaming and gambling venue. The neighborhood just south of Nungesser's is called the Racetrack Section and the municipality of Guttenberg is nearby. A White Castle, an early drive-in fast-food chain, originally built in the 1930s has long been a landmark in the neighborhood, as has adjacent North Hudson Park.

== Intersection ==
A major street that begins at Nungessers is Bergenline Avenue which travelling south becomes the main shopping district of North Hudson. Just over the county line it becomes Anderson Avenue, travelling north through the urban eastern Bergen Hudson Palisades communities of Fairview, Cliffside Park and Fort Lee. The other roads which meet in the district are Kennedy Boulevard, Bergen Boulevard and Fairview Avenue from the west. To the east Boulevard East and Woodcliff Avenue connect to the northbound Palisade Avenue in the park.

== Transportation ==
Nungessers is a major transit transfer point and terminus for public bus transportation. Several New Jersey Transit bus lines either originate/terminate or pass through the area, as do many privately operated jitney (dollar van) routes. Service from bus stops situated in the area travels to points in Hudson and Bergen and to the Port Authority Bus Terminal and the George Washington Bridge Bus Station in Manhattan. Jitneys travel southbound to Boulevard East, Hudson County Courthouse, Newport Mall, 42nd Street (Manhattan), and northbound along Anderson Avenue to George Washington Bridge Plaza.

== Service ==
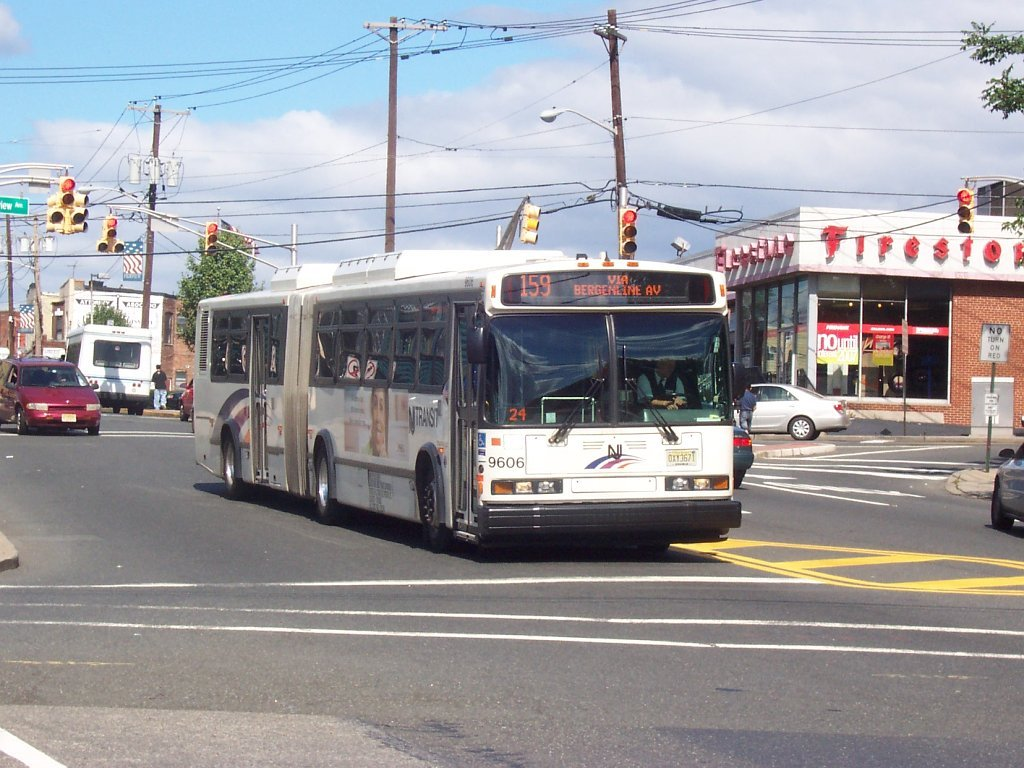
The 159 travels along busy Anderson-Bergenline corridor.

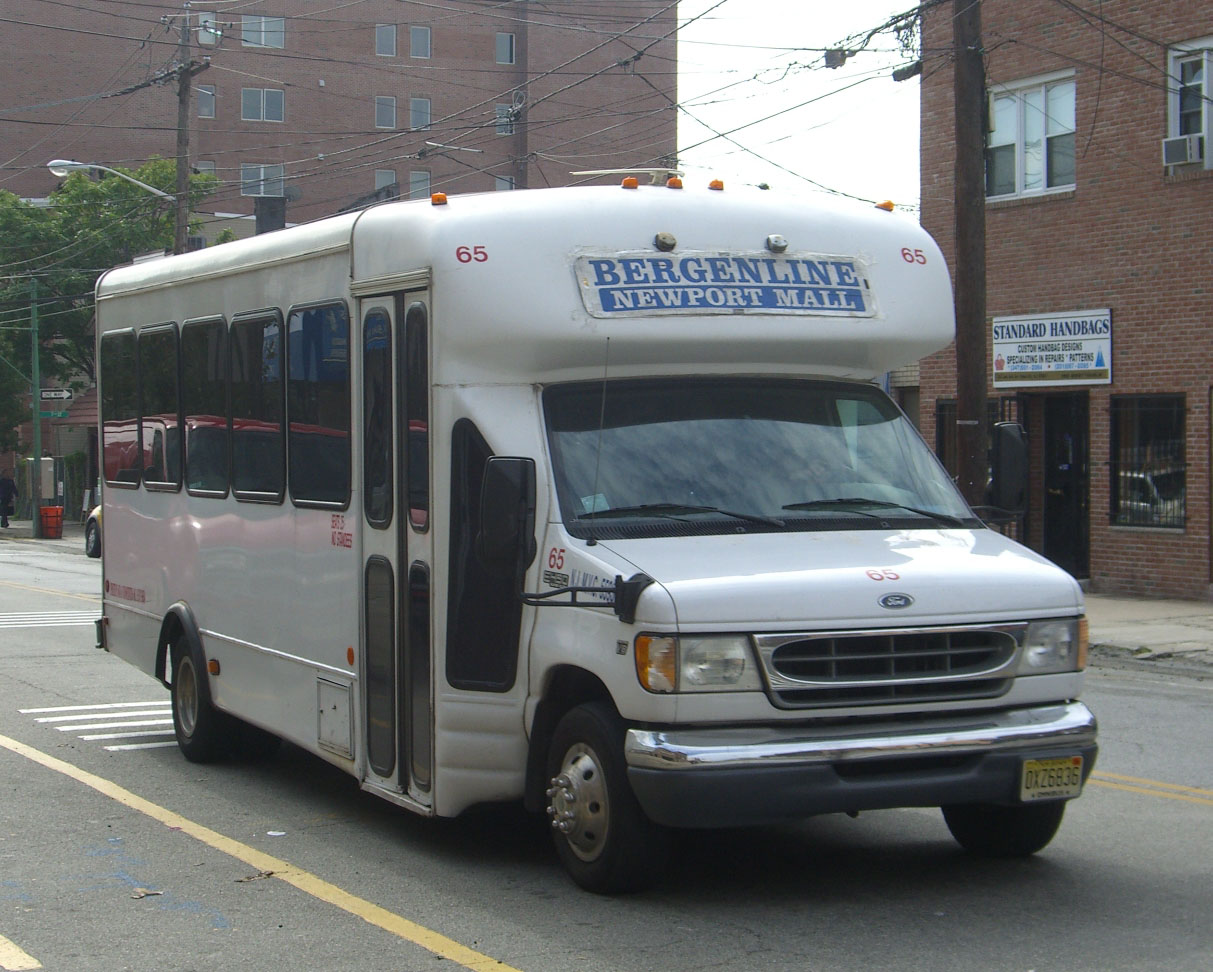
Dollar vans, or guaguas, augment NJT bus service.

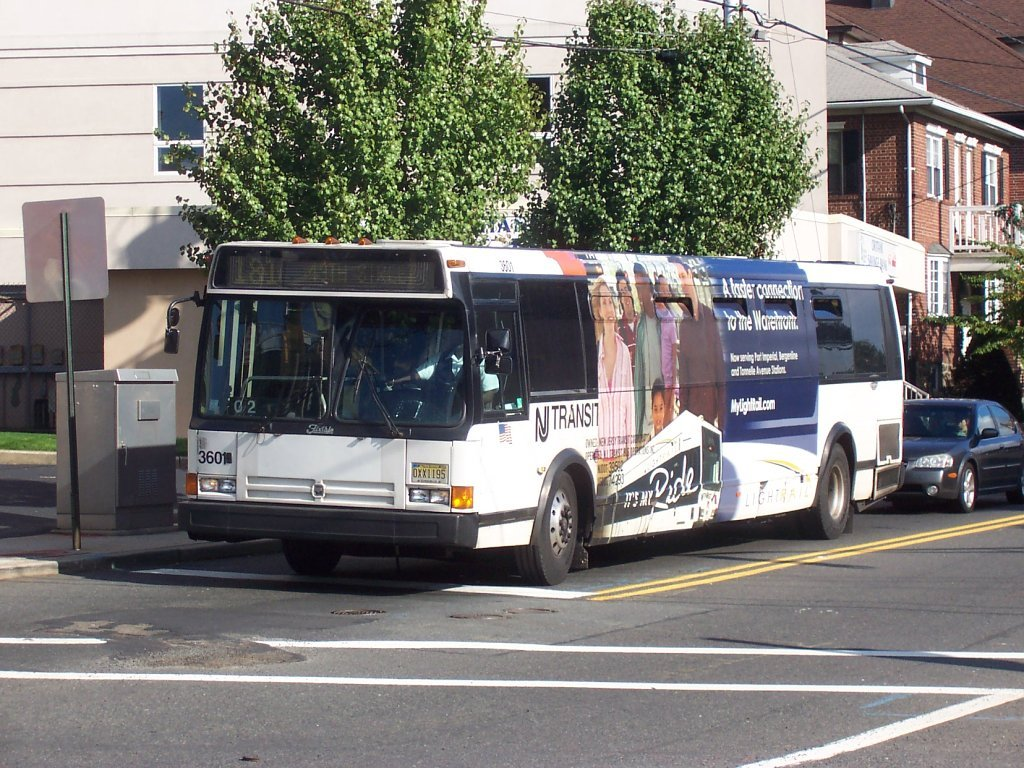
Of the many buses passing Nungessers, the 181 is the only Manhattan-bound bus to terminate at GWB Station.

route	destination	major points
22 southbound NJT	Hudson Place; Hoboken Terminal	Bergenline Station; NJ 495 Marginal Highway; 14th Street Viaduct
84 southbound NJT	Journal Square Transportation Center; Jersey City	Bergenline Station; NJ 495 Marginal Highway; 9th/Congress Station; Jersey City Heights; Hudson County Courthouse
88 southbound NJT	Journal Square Transportation Center; Jersey City	Kennedy Boulevard via Bergenline Station; Transfer Station; Jersey City Heights
89 southbound NJT	Hudson Place; Hoboken Terminal	Bergenline Station; Weehawken Water Tower; Willow Ave/Park Ave; 14th Street (Hoboken)
128 eastbound NJT	Port Authority Bus Terminal; 42nd Street (Manhattan)	Boulevard East; Lincoln Tunnel
154 northbound NJT	Fort Lee	Ridgefield; Palisades Park
154 southbound NJT	Port Authority Bus Terminal; 42nd Street (Manhattan)	Kennedy Boulevard; 495 Marginal Highway; Lincoln Tunnel
156 northbound NJT	Englewood Cliffs	Palisade Avenue; Cliffside; Edgewater; GWB Plaza
156 southbound NJT	Port Authority Bus Terminal; 42nd Street (Manhattan)	Bergenline; Weehawken Water Tower; Lincoln Tunnel
159 northbound NJT	GWB Plaza; Fort Lee	city = GWB Plaza
159 southbound NJT	Port Authority Bus Terminal; 42nd Street (Manhattan)	Bergenline; 495 Marginal Highway; Lincoln Tunnel
165 northbound NJT	Westwood, New Jersey	The Ridgefields; Hackensack; Kinderkamack Road; Emerson (NJT station)
165 eastbound NJT	Port Authority Bus Terminal; 42nd Street (Manhattan)	Boulevard East; Lincoln Tunnel
166 eastbound NJT	Englewood; Cresskill	
166 eastbound NJT	Port Authority Bus Terminal; 42nd Street (Manhattan)	Boulevard East; Lincoln Tunnel
168 northbound NJT	Paramus Park	The Ridgefields; Teaneck; Hackensack
168 eastbound NJT	Port Authority Bus Terminal; 42nd Street (Manhattan)	Boulevard East; Lincoln Tunnel
181 eastbound NJT	George Washington Bridge Bus Terminal; 175th Street Station; Manhattan	Palisade Avenue; GWB Plaza
751 westbound NJT	Bergen Community College	Teaneck; Hackensack Bus Transfer; The Outlets at Bergen Town Center
751 eastbound NJT	Edgewater Commons	Cliffside Park; Anderson Avenue
NY Waterway eastbound NY Waterway	Port Imperial	Boulevard East
