= Hudson Heights =

Hudson Heights may refer to:

- Hudson Heights, Manhattan, a neighborhood in New York City
- Hudson Heights, North Bergen, alternate name used for the Racetrack Section of North Bergen in Hudson County, New Jersey
- Hudson Heights, Quebec, a neighborhood in Hudson, Quebec
