= List of NJ Transit bus routes (1–99) =

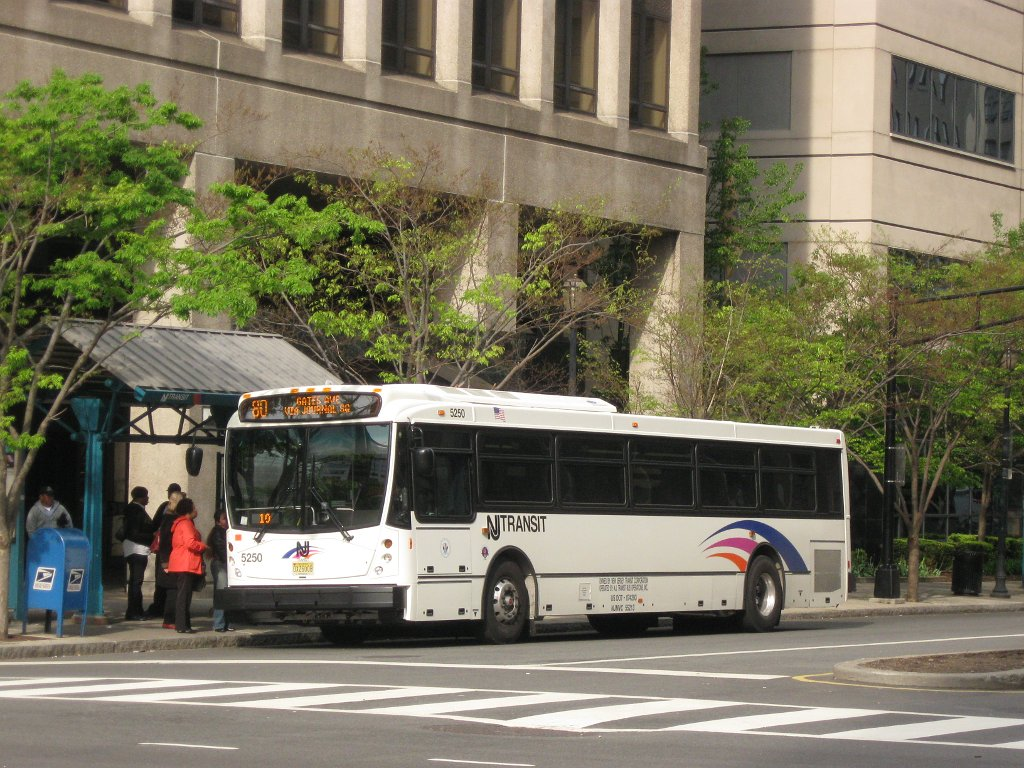
#5250 on the #80 in Jersey City.

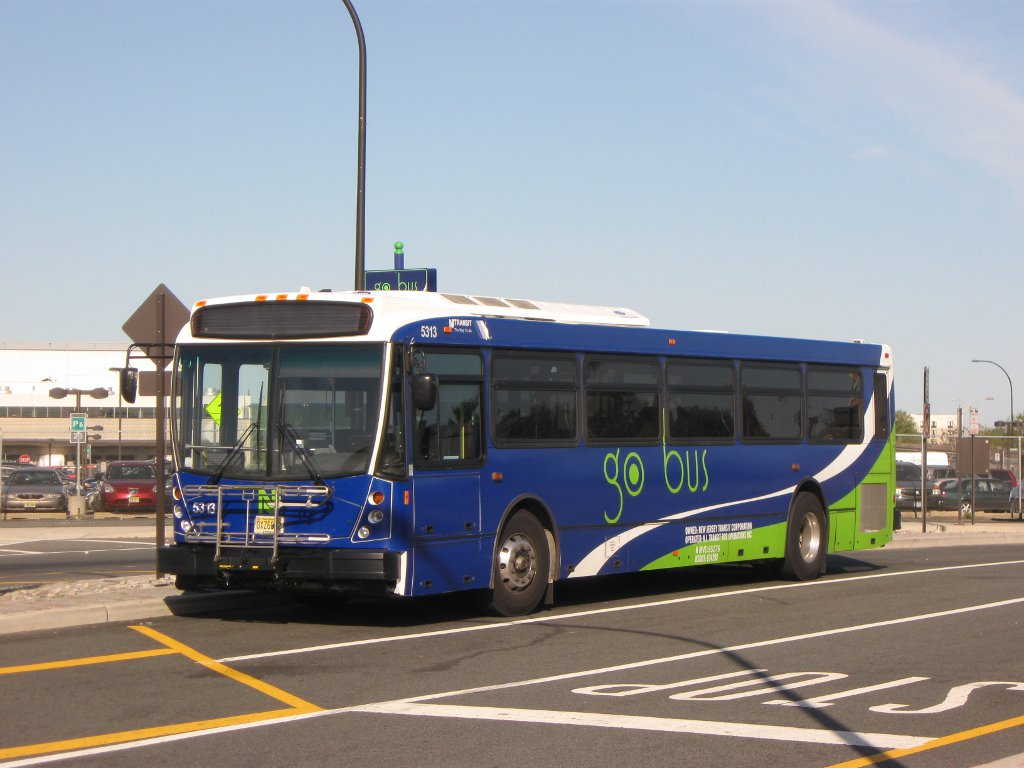
#5313 wrapped for the gobus 28 at Newark Airport North Area.

NJ Transit operates or contracts out the following bus routes, all of which originate from Newark, Jersey City, Hoboken, or Elizabeth. Many were once streetcar lines. These routes are operated from NJ Transit bus garages in the agency's Northern and Central Divisions. Not included in the list of lines below is the Newark Light Rail system, which is also operated from the Central Division.

== Routes ==
=== Northern Division ===
The following lines are operated from garages in NJ Transit's Northern Division. All routes are exact fare lines. In this table, PSCT represents Public Service Coordinated Transport, a predecessor to Transport of New Jersey.

Destinations shown are for the full route except for branching.

Route	Terminals		Major points	Notes	History	Garage
2	Journal Square	Secaucus Junction	Kennedy Boulevard, County Avenue, Secaucus Plaza	P trips operate via N.J International Bulk Mail Center.; R trips operate via JFK Blvd to Secaucus Road.	Began under Hudson Bus Transportation Co.; Route operated with Academy Bus until 2021, Coach USA ONE Bus in 2022, and then returned to NJ Transit in 2024.	Kearny Point
6	Journal Square	Bayonne; 55th Street and Broadway	Ocean Avenue		Initially Lafayette & Greenville Bus 3 Ocean Avenue.; Later Red & Tan in Hudson Co. 99.; Service initiated on February 11, 2008.; "L" variant trips via Liberty State Park discontinued on June 21, 2025 and replaced by route 16.; Extended to 55th Street in Bayonne on January 10, 2026.	Greenville
8	Journal Square	Bayonne 54th Street	Bergen Avenue, Old Bergen Road		Began service under Bergen Avenue IBOA.; Transferred to Montgomery and West Side IBOA in 2011, numbered #33 in 2016.; Service under NJT began October 28, 2023.	Kearny Point
9	Jersey City Society Hill	Newport Mall	West Side Avenue, Montgomery Street, Marin Boulevard		Began under Montgomery and West Side IBOA. Numbered #31 in 2016.; Service under NJT began October 28, 2023.	Kearny Point
10	Journal Square	Bayonne; 2nd Street	Kennedy Boulevard		Began under Drogin Bus Company.; Later operated under Red & Tan in Hudson County until April 7, 2012; transferred to Academy under contract to NJT on April 8, 2012.; Contract trans. to Coach USA on June 24, 2021.; Route operated by NJT effective June 26, 2022.; Late night service replicated by route 119.	Kearny Point; Meadowlands; Greenville
12	Bayonne; 54th Street	Bayonne; 1st Street	Broadway		Began under Broadway IBOA.; Service under Broadway IBOA ran further north to City Line at 63rd Street & Kennedy Boulevard via 54th and 55th Streets.; Service under NJ Transit began on December 1, 2025.	Greenville
14	Journal Square	Jersey City Hudson Mall	Sip Avenue, West Side Avenue		Began under Montgomery and West Side IBOA. Numbered #32 in 2016.; Service under New Jersey Transit began October 28, 2023.	Kearny Point
16	Journal Square	Newport Mall	Baldwin Avenue, Garfield Avenue, Pacific Avenue, Communipaw Avenue, Liberty State Park station		Began under Lafayette & Greenville IBOA.; Later Red & Tan in Hudson County route 16.; Original service discontinued January 2008.; Service under New Jersey Transit began on June 21, 2025.	Greenville
22	Hoboken Terminal	North Bergen Nungessers	Washington Street and New York/Bergenline Avenues		Began in 1924 under PSCT to replace North Hudson County Railway Hillside line streetcars, using 14th Street Viaduct.; NJ Transit took over operations of the 22 on June 27, 2004, removing its original service to Fort Lee Med West under Academy-No.22 Hillside LLC, terminating at Winston Towers under NJ Transit.; Service to Winston Towers in Cliffside Park was cut back to Nungessers on April 8, 2006.	Meadowlands
23	Port Imperial or Hoboken Terminal	North Bergen Nungessers	Boulevard East	Weekday peak hour service only (AM to Port Imperial/Hoboken Terminal, PM to North Bergen)	Began in 1924 under PSCT.; Formerly the 22 Boulevard East service, renumbered to 23 on June 27, 2004, when NJ Transit took over operations of the 22.	Meadowlands
72	Paterson Broadway Bus Terminal	Newark Penn	Bloomfield Avenue, Broad Street		Began in 1927 under PSCT.; Express buses added in 1951.; Formerly routes 126 & 128.	Market Street
74	Paterson Broadway Bus Terminal	Branch Brook Park	Main Street/Main Avenue and Kingsland Street/Kingsland Road (all trips); Delawanna Avenue and Clifton Commons (select trips); Washington Avenue (select trips); Union Avenue (select trips); Franklin Avenue (most trips)		Began in 1927 under PSCT.	Market Street
80	Jersey City-Greenville; Gates Avenue or Society Hill	Exchange Place or Journal Square	Seaview Avenue, Romar Avenue, West Side Avenue, Newark Avenue, and Montgomery Street	Select trips operate along Sip Avenue bypassing Montgomery Street and Bergen Avenue.; Most 80S trips terminate at Society Hill	Began in 1947 under PSCT to replace Public Service Railway Newark Avenue Line streetcars from 1938.; Formerly route 9 Newark Avenue.; 80S trips to Society Hill began under Montgomery and West Side IBOA. Numbered #30 in 2016.; Current expanded 80S service under New Jersey Transit began October 28, 2023, replacing both A&C #30 and previous weekday rush-only 80S service operated under NJT.	Greenville
81	Bayonne	Exchange Place	Avenue C, Ocean Avenue, Montgomery Street	81X: Weekday peak hour service only (AM to Exchange Place, PM to Bayonne); Select trips begin/end at Jersey City-Greenville	Began in 1947 under PSCT to replace Public Service Railway Greenville Line streetcars from 1937.; Service to 8th Street Station began on January 8, 2011.; Formerly route 14/14X Greenville.	Greenville
82	Union City	Exchange Place	Summit Avenue, Newark Avenue, Montgomery Street	Weekday peak hour service only (AM to Exchange Place, PM to Union City)	Began in 1947 under PSCT to replace Public Service Railway streetcars from 1931.; Formerly route 18 Hudson.	Meadowlands
83	Hackensack Terminal	Journal Square	Main Street, Tonnelle Avenue, Summit Avenue		Began in 1928 under PSCT.; Formerly route 124.	Meadowlands
84	Journal Square	North Bergen Nungessers	Newark Avenue, Palisade Avenue, Park Avenue, and Bergenline Avenue		Began in 1927 under PSCT.; Formerly Route 44 Bergenline/Park Avenue.; Operated by Coach USA ONE Bus effective June 26, 2022; Returned to NJ Transit on August 17, 2024, from Coach USA ONE Bus operations.	Meadowlands
85	Hoboken Terminal	American Dream Meadowlands	Paterson Plank Road, Summit Avenue, Harmon Meadow		Began in 1947 under PSCT to replace Public Service Railway Passaic Line streetcars from 1936.; Service to Harmon Meadow initiated on April 30, 1984.; Formerly Route 15 Passaic, then renamed 15 Secaucus under NJ Transit.; Routed to American Dream Mall in East Rutherford, NJ on August 30, 2019 (along with routes 703 and 772).	Meadowlands
86	Newport Centre Mall	Bergenline Avenue Station	Newark Avenue, Palisade Avenue, Park Avenue, Bergenline Avenue		Began in 1991 under NJ Transit as a variant of route 84.; Cut back to Bergenline Avenue Station from North Bergen on April 8, 2006.; Trips via Bergen-Lafayette and Exchange Place were discontinued on June 21, 2025 and replaced by Route 16.	Meadowlands
87	Jersey City-Greenville	Hoboken Terminal	Old Bergen Road, MLK Drive, Bergen Avenue, Central Avenue, Palisade Avenue, and Paterson Plank Road	Select late night "Owl" trips begin/end at UPS Drive in Secaucus	Began under PSCT in 1947 to replace Public Service Railway Jackson Line streetcars.; Formerly routes 7 Jackson & 8 Jackson Express.	Greenville
88	Journal Square	North Bergen Nungessers	Kennedy Boulevard	Select trips operate along Central Avenue.	Began in under North Boulevard Transportation Company as route 1.; * Returned to NJ Transit on August 17, 2024 from Coach USA ONE Bus operations.	Meadowlands
89	Hoboken Terminal	North Bergen Nungessers	Park Avenue, Washington Street, and Bergenline Avenue		Began in 1949 under PSCT to replace Public Service Railway Union City Line streetcars.; Rerouted south of 48th Street to Park Avenue on April 8, 2006.; Daily service initiated on April 8, 2006.; Formerly routes 19 Union City & 26 Union City.	Meadowlands

=== Central Division ===
The following lines are operated from garages in NJ Transit's Central Division. All lines are exact fare lines except for the 63, 64, 67, and 68. In this table, PSCT represents Public Service Coordinated Transport, a predecessor to Transport of New Jersey.

Destinations shown are for the full route except for branching.

==== Central Division, Essex County ====
Route	Terminals		Major streets	Notes	History	Garage
1	Newark-Ivy Hill	Journal Square Exchange Place Newark-Ironbound	16 Avenue, Market Street, and Ferry Street/Raymond Boulevard (all trips); Communipaw Avenue (Exchange Place trips); West Side Avenue (Journal Square trips)	Trips either end at Journal Square or Exchange Place	Had an express "X" variant between Ivy Hill and Newark Penn Station until April 3, 2010, when it was renumbered to route 361.; Service to Hudson County Correctional Facility discontinued on September 5, 2026, due to property restrictions.	Hilton; Big Tree; Orange
5	Newark Penn	East Orange	18 Avenue and South 10 Street		Began under PSCT in 1948 to replace Public Service Railway Kinney Line streetcars from 1936.	Orange
11	Willowbrook Mall	Downtown Newark (weekdays and Saturdays); Newark Penn (not to Wayne on Sundays)	Bloomfield Avenue and Pompton Avenue	Evening and Sunday trips are extended to Newark Penn Station	Began under PSCT in 1929.; Formerly route 114.	Orange
13	Irvington Bus Terminal or Valley Fair	Clifton; Clifton Commons, or Clifton Industrial Park	Bloomfield Avenue (Clifton trips only), Washington Avenue (Clifton Commons Trips only), Broadway, Clinton Avenue	All different trip labels with different ends.; "B" terminates at Big Tree Garage.; "C" northbound via Clifton Commons.; "M" short turn to Belleville at Mill & Main St.; "N" north bound buses via Centre St. in Nutley.; "T" south bound to Irvington.; "V" south bound to Valley Fair.; "P" north bound to Lincoln Park, Newark (A.M only).	Began under PSCT in 1937 to replace Public Service Railway Broad Line streetcars from 1937.; Operation via Chancellor Avenue (former route 14) switched with route 39 in the 1980s.; "13J" trips via Joralemon Avenue to Garden State Cancer Center in Belleville were eliminated in 2011 and replaced by "13C" trips to Clifton Commons via Washington Avenue.	Big Tree; Hilton
21	West Orange; Mississippi Loop	Newark Penn	Main Street, Market Street		Began under PSCT in 1952 to replace Public Service Railway Orange Line streetcars, which operated into the Newark City Subway.	Orange
24	Orange; Erie Loop	The Mills at Jersey Gardens	Elizabeth Avenue, Frelinghuysen Avenue, Central Avenue	24H to Orange via Harrison; 24S to Orange via Scottland; 24J to Jersey Gardens via Jersey Street; 24E to Jersey Gardens via Elizabeth Ave; 24T trips are trips to Newark Harriet Tubman Park; 24B are trips to Elizabeth Broad and Jersey	Originally Transport of New Jersey, transferred to Coach USA ONE Bus; Scotland Road/Elizabeth Avenue/First Street division operated as Route 24A, while Harrison Street/East Jersey Street/Third Street division operated as Route 24B; alpha suffixes assigned 2006.; NJT and Academy Bus Lines jointly took over operations on October 9, 2023.; NJT fully took operations in November 2023.	Ironbound; Hilton; Orange
25	Maplewood	Essex County Correctional Facility	Springfield Avenue, Newark Penn Station		Began under PSCT in 1948 to replace Public Service Railway Springfield Line streetcars from 1937.; Service to Essex County Correctional Facility began on April 3, 2004.; Had an express "X" variant between Maplewood and Newark Penn Station until April 3, 2010, when it was renumbered to route 375.	Hilton
go25	Irvington Bus Terminal	Newark Penn Station	Springfield Avenue	Weekday peak hour service only; Makes limited stops on Springfield Avenue.	Service began on April 7, 2008, providing faster service to Irvington Bus Terminal.	Hilton
26	Elizabeth	Irvington Bus Terminal	Union Avenue, Morris Avenue, Kean University		Began under Elizabeth-Union-Hillside-Irvington Bus Line in 1927.; Formerly Route 6.; Operation via Cherry Street in Elizabeth was discontinued after NJ Transit's takeover of the route.	Hilton
27	Irvington Bus Terminal	Forest Hill or Bloomfield Center (full-time); Delawanna (rush hours only)	Hawthorne Avenue, Broad Street, Mount Prospect Avenue, Franklin Street (Bloomfield trips only), Verona Avenue (Forest Hill trips only), Union Avenue and Kingsland Avenue (Clifton trips only), and Branch Brook Park Station	Select peak hour trips are extended to Delawanna; 27B trips to Bloomfield; 27F trips to Forest Hill; 27N trips to Nutley Delawanna; 27R trips to Newark Lt Rail Branch Brook Park Station	Began under PSCT in 1948 to replace Public Service Railway Mount Prospect Line streetcars from 1937.	Hilton; Orange
28	Montclair State University (full-time); Willowbrook Mall (weekends only)	Downtown Newark (weekdays and Saturdays); Newark Penn (evenings and Sundays)	Upper Mountain Avenue (Wayne trips only) Valley Road, Bloomfield Avenue	Weekend trips are extended to Willowbrook Mall; Evening and Sunday service are extended to Newark Penn	Began under PSCT in 1926.; Formerly route 60.	Orange
go28	Bloomfield Station	Newark International Airport	Bloomfield Avenue, Broad Street		Began service on October 17, 2009.; Service via University Heights was discontinued on September 1, 2012 due to budget cuts.	Orange
29	West Caldwell (full-time); Parsippany-Troy Hills (rush hours only)	Downtown Newark (weekdays and Saturdays); Newark Penn (evenings and Sundays)	U.S. Route 46 (Parsippany trips only), Bloomfield Avenue	Select peak hour trips are extended to Parsippany-Troy Hills; Evening and Sunday service is extended to Newark Penn	Began under PSCT in 1952 to replace Public Service Railway Bloomfield Line streetcars, which operated into the Newark City Subway.	Orange
30	North Arlington	Lincoln Park (weekdays); Newark Penn (evenings and weekends)	Kearny Avenue, Broad Street, Harrison Avenue, and Frank E Rodgers Blvd	Evening and weekend service is extended to Newark Penn	Began under PSCT in 1948 to replace Public Service Railway Harrison Line streetcars from 1937.; Formerly route 39/48 Harrison-Union; Part of route 39 until 2009.	Big Tree
31	Newark Penn	South Orange Station	South Orange Avenue		Formerly operated by South Orange Business Owners' Association, then later by Coach USA ONE bus.; NJ Transit took over operations on October 9, 2023.	Hilton
34	Newark Penn	Bloomfield or Montclair	Market Street, Roseville Avenue, Orange Road (Montclair trips only), Prospect Avenue (Bloomfield trips only)		Began under PSCT in 1923.	Orange
37	Newark-Ivy Hill	Newark Liberty International Airport	Lyons Avenue		Began under PSCT in 1923.	Hilton
39	Newark Penn	Irvington	Broad Street, Newark Beth Israel Medical Center, Chancellor Avenue		Began under PSCT in 1948 to replace Public Service Railway Harrison Line streetcars from 1937.; Formerly routes 14 & 39/48 Harrison-Union.; Northern section became route 30 in 2009.	Hilton
40	North Arlington	Jersey Gardens	Davis Avenue, Frank R. Rodgers Boulevard, Broad St, IKEA	Select trips serve Northern State Prison.	Began under PSCT in 1924.; Service previously ended at Belleville Turnpike west of Kearny Avenue/Ridge Road, cut back to North Arlington Loop on April 3, 2004.	Big Tree
41	Orange	Newark-Government Center (weekdays); Newark Penn (evenings and weekends)	Park Avenue	Evening and weekend trips are extended to Newark Penn	Began under PSCT in 1943.; Formerly route 51.; Original route 41 from Lincoln Park in Newark to Rutherford via River Road in Harrison, Kearny, North Arlington, and Stuyvesant Avenue in Lyndhurst discontinued in the 1980s.	Orange
44	Newark Penn	Orange Station	Central Avenue, Tremont Avenue, East Orange VA Medical Center		Formerly operated by Coach USA One Bus.; NJ Transit took over operations on October 9, 2023.	Big Tree

==== Central Division: Union County ====
Route	Terminals		Major streets	Notes	History	Garage
52	Springfield	Elizabeth	Morris Avenue, Kean University	No Sunday service; Select weekday rush hour trips serve Magie Avenue.	Began under PSCT in 1928 to replace Morris County Traction Company streetcars.; Cut back from Short Hills Mall to Springfield Center in late 1980s.; Formerly route 8 Morris Avenue.	Hilton
56	Elizabeth	Winfield Park	Broad Street, Edgar Road, and Wood Avenue	No Sunday service	Began under Beviano Chartered Service in 1916.; Formerly route 44 Edgar Road.; Route now starts/ends at Broad & Jersey Streets in Elizabeth.	Ironbound
57	Elizabeth	Linden Aviation Plaza	Broad Street, Elizabeth Avenue, Wood Avenue	No Sunday service	Began service to Legacy Square Shopping Center on September 2, 2023.; Began in 1994 under NJ Transit as a variant of route 56 to serve Linden Plaza; Originally operated via Park Avenue and Linden Avenue.; Route now starts/ends at Broad & Jersey Streets in Elizabeth.	Ironbound
58	Union County College	Elizabeth	Kenilworth Boulevard, Westfield Avenue, Bayway Avenue		Began under PSCT in 1924 to replace Public Service Railway Aldene Line and Elmora Line streetcars.; Formerly route 28 Roselle Park.	Ironbound
59	Dunellen	Washington Park	Front Street, South Avenue, Broad Street, Elizabeth Avenue		Began under PSCT in 1947 to replace Public Service Railway Union Line streetcars from 1935.; Formerly route 49 Union.	Ironbound

==== Central Division: South and west from Hudson County/Newark ====
Route	Terminals		Major streets	Notes	History	Garage
48	Woodbridge Center; Perth Amboy	Elizabeth	Broad Street (Elizabeth), Rahway Avenue, Inman Avenue (via Metropark), Roosevelt Avenue (via Carteret), Amboy Street (Perth Amboy trips) & Woodbridge Mall		Began under Transport of New Jersey in 1933 to replace Public Service Railway's Perth Amboy Line and Carteret Line streetcars.; Part of route 62 until September 1, 2012.	Ironbound
62	Newark Penn	Elizabeth (full-time) Newark Liberty International Airport (select trips)	Broad Street (Newark), US 1&9, Jersey Street, Ikea, and Airport South Area	24-hour service	Began under Transport of New Jersey in 1933 to replace Public Service Railway's Perth Amboy Line and Carteret Line streetcars.; Southern section became route 48 on September 1, 2012.; A branch to Woodbridge Center once went as far as New Brunswick, numbered 134; split off into the 810 line.	Ironbound
63	Lakewood Bus Terminal	Lincoln Harbor	U.S. Route 9 (first dropoff southbound/last pickup northbound at Old Bridge Park & Ride)	Weekday rush hours only (AM to Lincoln Harbor, PM to Lakewood Bus Terminal); 63 operates once in each direction as 63X, running non-stop between Gordon's Corner and Old Bridge park and rides.	Began in 2010 under NJ Transit as a variant of route 64.	Howell
64	Lakewood Bus Terminal	Lincoln Harbor	U.S. Route 9 (first dropoff southbound/last pickup northbound at Old Bridge Park & Ride)	Weekday rush hours only (AM to Lincoln Harbor, PM to Lakewood Bus Terminal); 63 operates once in each direction as 63X, running non-stop between Gordon's Corner and Old Bridge park and rides.	Began in 2001 under NJ Transit as a variant of route 67.; Formerly operated 64J service via Journal Square Transportation Center; was discontinued April 6, 2024.	Howell
65	Bridgewater Commons	Newark Penn Station	Route 28, Watchung Avenue, U.S. Route 22, Elizabeth Avenue, and Clinton Avenue	Weekday rush hours and Saturday mornings only	Began under Somerset Bus Company in 1925.; Formerly route 140.; Service via Washington Park discontinued on June 23, 2018.	Ironbound
66	Union County College	Newark Penn Station	Mountain Avenue, Morris Avenue or Vauxhall Road, Salem Road, Liberty Avenue, Hillside Avenue, Elizabeth Avenue, Clinton Avenue, and Washington Street		Began under Somerset Bus Company in 1925.; Formerly route 141.; Service via Washington Park discontinued on June 23, 2018.	Ironbound
67	Toms River Park and Ride	Newark Penn	U.S. Route 9 and Route 549		Began in 1989 under NJ Transit to distinguish branches of route 137 that did not serve New York PABT.; 67B service and Journal Square service last ran on Nov 4, 2022. However, schedules show it discontinued on Nov 6, 2022.; 67X (express of the 67) last ran on Jan 13, 2023. It was discontinued the next day on Jan 14, 2023.; Seasonal trips to Seaside Park were discontinued in 2023. The last runs were in the summer of 2022.	Howell
68	Old Bridge	Lincoln Harbor	Route 18, Route 516	Weekday rush hours only (AM to Lincoln Harbor, PM to Old Bridge)	Began in 1989 under NJ Transit to distinguish branches of route 138 that did not serve New York PABT.	Howell

==== Central Division: North and west from Newark ====
All of these routes originate from Newark Penn Station.

Route	Outbound terminal	Major streets	Notes	History	Garage
70	Livingston Mall	Clinton Avenue, Avon Avenue, Springfield Avenue, Short Hills Mall		Began under Transport of New Jersey in 1928 to replace Morris County Traction Company streetcars.; Cut back from Morris Plains in 1976.; Morris Plains-Livingston Mall portion of route now route 873.	Hilton
71	West Caldwell; Essex Mall	Market Street, Main Street, Mount Pleasant Avenue, Bloomfield Avenue		Began under DeCamp Bus Lines in 1925.; Formerly route 144.; Service via Prudential Drive in Roseland began on January 12, 2008.	Orange
73	Livingston Mall	Eisenhower Parkway, Mt. Pleasant Avenue, Livingston Avenue, Northfield Avenue, Main Street, Market Street		Began under DeCamp Bus Lines in 1923.; Formerly route 146.	Orange
76	Hackensack Bus Terminal	Ridge Road, Rutherford Station, Hackensack Street	Express (76X) operates weekday rush hours only.; Select rush hour trips serve Chubb Road in Lyndhurst and Gotham Parkway in Carlstadt.	Began under Transport of New Jersey in 1927. replaced the public service #37 streetcar; Express buses added in 1946.; Formerly route 102; "X" express route formerly route 104.	Big Tree
78	Secaucus	Raymond Boulevard, New Jersey Turnpike, Meadowlands Parkway, Seaview Drive	Weekday rush hours only	NJ Transit started operating buses in 1984.; Had an express "X" variant until April 3, 2010, when it was renumbered to route 378.	Big Tree
79	Parsippany-Troy Hills	Raymond Boulevard, Market Street, Main Street, Interstate 280, New Road, and U.S. Route 46	Weekday peak hour and limited Sunday service only	Began in 1995 under NJ Transit as a variant of route 29.	Orange

==== Central Division: Essex County crosstown routes ====
Route	Terminals		Major streets	Notes	History	Garage
90	Irvington; Bus Terminal or Chancellor & Springfield	Branch Brook Park	Grove Street, Chancellor Avenue		Began under Transport of New Jersey in 1929.; Extended to Chancellor & Springfield Avenues in 2022.	Hilton
92	South Orange	Branch Brook Park	Scotland Road, Day Street, Dodd Street, Glenwood Avenue, Belleville Avenue, Franklin Avenue		Began under Transport of New Jersey in 1924.; Formerly route 20.; Service via James Street and Spring Street in Bloomfield discontinued in early 1990s.; Service via Hoover Avenue and Joralemon Street split into route 93 in 1996, before being discontinued entirely on September 1, 2012.	Orange
94	Bloomfield	Linden Station or Union	Prospect Street, Clinton Street, Stuyvesant Avenue, Chestnut Street, Roselle Street	Trips are labeled based on their southern ends.; "C" trips are short turn southbound buses to Irvington Center.; "U" trips are southbound buses to Union Center.; "SR" trips are southbound buses to Union-RT22 that run via Stanley Terrace in Union.; "VR" trips are southbound buses to Union-RT22 that run via Vauxhall Road in Union. These trips run on Saturdays only.; "L" trips are southbound buses to Linden Rail Station.	Began under Trackless Transit Company in 1922.; Truncated to operate between Bloomfield and Union/Linden in 1996 following creation of route 93.; Formerly routes 94 & 96.	Orange
96	Newark; Roseville	Newark; Valley Fair	Roseville Avenue, 10th Street, 18th Street, Fabyan Place	No Sunday service	Began under Transport of New Jersey in 1923.; Formerly route 6.; Service to Newark City Subway terminus via 6th Street discontinued in the mid-1980s.	Orange
97	East Orange	Montclair	Halsted Street, Washington Street, Harrison Avenue, Bloomfield Avenue	No Sunday service	Began under PSCT in 1928.; Formerly route 64.	Orange
99	Branch Brook Park	Hillside	Heller Pkwy., Mt. Prospect Ave., Clifton Avenue, Norfolk Street, Irvine Turner Boulevard, Bergen Street	Select weekday trips operate to Union/Belleville Avenues in Belleville.	Began under Transport of New Jersey in 1947 to replace Public Service Railway Clifton Line streetcars from 1937.; Formerly route 9.; Extended from 7th Avenue, Newark to Branch Brook Park station on September 1, 2012.	Big Tree

== Former routes ==
This list includes routes that have been renumbered or were operated by private companies.

Route	Terminals		Major streets	Current status
12 (first use)	Newark	Elizabeth	Frelinghuysen Avenue (Elmora Avenue originally)	Transferred to ONE Bus; Merged into the 24.
22X	Bergenline Avenue Station	Hoboken Terminal	Observer Highway, Paterson Plank Road, 9th Street-Congress Street, Palisade Avenue, Bergenline Avenue	Began service on April 8, 2006 following rerouting of route 89 to Park Avenue.; Weekday peak hour service only (AM to Hoboken Terminal, PM to Bergenline Avenue); Discontinued on October 28, 2023.
23 (first use)	Newark	Orange		Merged into the 44.
32	Newark	Maplewood	Market Street, South Orange Avenue, Prospect Street, Tuscan Road, Baker Street	
36	Newark	Arlington Depot	Broad Street, Clay Street, Central Avenue, Grant Avenue, Belgrove Drive, Midland Avenue	Discontinued. Now (except for the Grant Avenue segment) part of #76 line.
42	Irvington	Washington Park	18th Avenue	PSCT began operating buses in 1925. Service was rerouted/extended from Irvington Terminal to 42nd St & Chancellor in Irvington between Late 2008–Early 2009.; Discontinued on September 1, 2012.
43	Newark	Exchange Place Jersey City-Greenville; Gates Avenue	Harrison Avenue, Newark Avenue, Montgomery Street (Exchange Place trips only), Old Bergen Road (Greenville trips only)	PSCT all service vehicles replaced Public Service Railway's Jersey City Line streetcars in 1938; replaced by buses in 1947.; Discontinued on September 1, 2012.
49	Newark	Garwood	U.S. Route 1/9	Discontinued in the early 1980’s.
50	Elizabeth	North Elizabeth	First Street, Elizabeth Avenue, Broad Street, East Broad Street, Magnolia Avenue, North Avenue, Madison Avenue	Northern leg of this route absorbed by 56/57 line (to Virginia Street); southern leg merged into route 24 (Elizabeth Avenue, First Street, Trumbull Street).; Was #30 First Street before Union County routes were renumbered in the 50s range.
54	Summit	Scotch Plains	Springfield Avenue, Plainfield Avenue, Bonnie Burn Road, Park Avenue	
60	Newark Airport	Toms River	Garden State Parkway	Seen on bus signs. Unknown when it discontinued.
61	Newark	Monmouth Beach	Route 36, Garden State Parkway	Discontinued. Acquired from Academy Bus, then sold back.
72X	Newark Penn	Paterson	Route 21, Bloomfield Avenue	Discontinued on June 24, 2006.
75	Newark Penn	Butler Meadetown Shopping Center William Paterson University	Newark-Pompton Turnpike, Route 23, Interstate 280, Raymond Boulevard	PSCT started operating buses in 1929.; Formerly route 15.; Service via Wayne Route 23 Transit Center began on January 12, 2008.; Discontinued on September 1, 2012.
93	Bloomfield	Branch Brook Park	Broad Street, Hoover Avenue, Franklin Avenue	NJ Transit introduced the 93 in 1996 to take over the portion of the 94 that operated between Bloomfield and the Newark City Subway bus transfer at Franklin Avenue/Branch Brook Park, as a two-branched route; route 93H operated via Hoover Avenue and Joralemon Street (former route 92 weekday/Saturday routing); route 93M operated via Montgomery and Mill Streets.; Discontinued on September 1, 2012.
95	Newark Penn	Scotch Plains	Route 21, Morris Avenue, Mountain Avenue	Began service on March 3, 2014.; Weekday peak hour service only (AM to Newark, PM to Scotch Plains); Discontinued on June 23, 2018.
