= Hudson County Correctional Facility =

Prison in New Jersey, United States

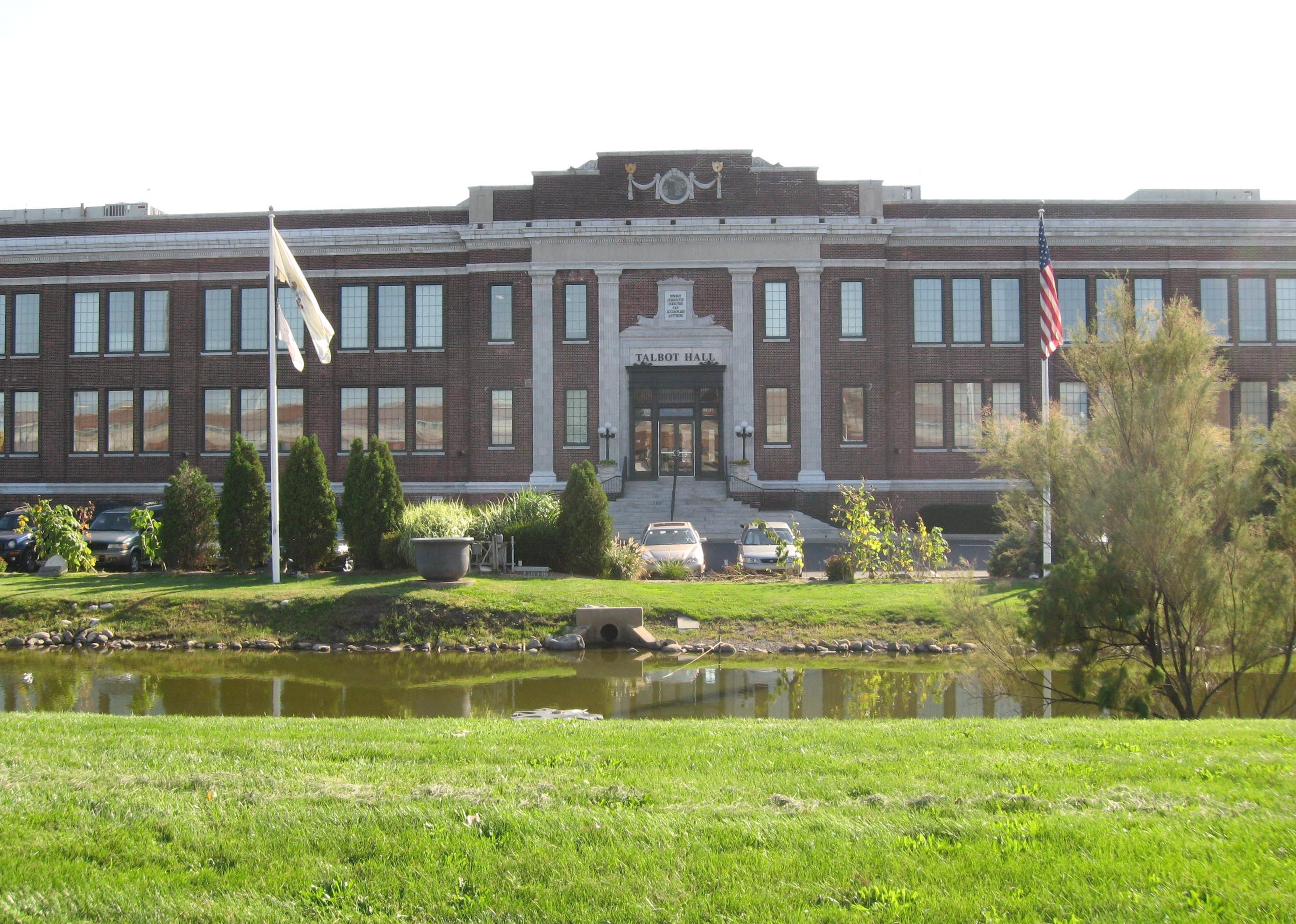
- Exterior of Talbot Hall, part of Hudson County Correctional Facility
- Interactive map of Hudson County Correctional Facility
- Location: Kearny, New Jersey, U.S.; 40°43′40.9″N 74°06′30.1″W
- Status: Operational
- Security class: Minimum
- Opened: 1845 (181 years ago)
- Managed by: Hudson County Department of Corrections
- Director: Ronald P. Edwards
- Website: Hudson County Department of Corrections

Hudson County Correctional Facility (HCCF) is a prison operated by Hudson County, New Jersey located in Kearny, New Jersey. It houses separate wards for women and men. The facility is one of the many regional centers used by Immigration & Customs Enforcement (ICE) for the New York metropolitan area.

== History ==
The predecessor building to the current Hudson County Correctional Facility first opened in 1845 next to the original Hudson County Court House as a small jail located in Jersey City. Over the years new jail facilities were constructed in the county with new facilities built in Secaucus in 1926, to the current jail located in Kearny which was built in 1990.

Five facility employees, including a corrections officer, died during COVID-19.

== Controversies ==
=== Prisoner conditions ===
Hudson County Correctional Facility has had several reports in recent years about conditions for prisoners at the facility. In February 2018 Human Rights First published Ailing Justice: New Jersey, a report about three New Jersey prison facilities (Hudson County Correctional Facility, Essex County Correctional Facility, and Elizabeth Detention Facility) found prisoners at HCCF overall were provided poor quality medical care (or outright denial of care), were given poor quality food lacking nutrition, and food were served on dishes that were unwashed or washed with dirty water.

Mental health facilities were also called out in this same report, with the report concluding that the program "may actually discourage people from seeking mental health care and may contribute to suicidal inclinations".

=== Contract with ICE ===
Hudson County Correctional Facility is one of the many regional centers used by ICE for the New York metropolitan area. The partnership between HCCF and ICE (then the Immigration and Naturalization Service) dates back to 1996, with a contract resigned in 2003. Hudson County government has gone on record on stating that the money used from this contract has gone to pay for various infrastructure improvements around the county, with at least half of all inmates at the facility being ICE detainees. Still, Hudson County Freeholder Bill O’Dea and others have argued against the ICE contract renewal.

== Transportation ==
Currently the only public transit to Hudson County Correctional Facility is the NJ Transit Route 1 bus. Connections to this bus can be made at two nearby transportation hubs: Newark Penn and Journal Square.
