= East Wind Over Weehawken =

1934 painting by Edward Hopper

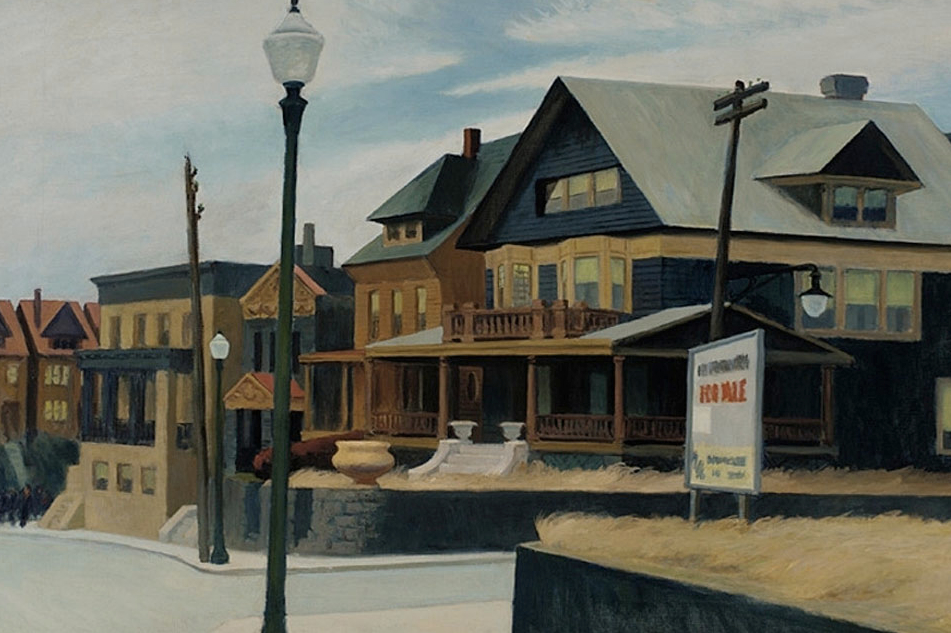
- Artist: Edward Hopper
- Year: 1934
- Medium: Oil on canvas
- Dimensions: 86.4 cm × 127.6 cm (34 in × 50.2 in)
- Location: private collection

East Wind Over Weehawken is a 1934 oil painting on canvas by American realist painter Edward Hopper. It was held in the collection of the Pennsylvania Academy of Fine Arts in the United States from 1952 until its sale to an anonymous buyer in December 2013. That sale brought a record price for a Hopper.

== Description ==
East Wind Over Weehawken is a street scene of a "curiously mismatched collection of four houses" rendered in dark, earthy tones. It includes the gabled house at 1001 Boulevard East at the corner of 49th Street in Weehawken, New Jersey (+40.7785°N 74.0130°W) and was painted during the Great Depression. The piece measures 34 x 50.2 inches or 86.4 x 127.6 centimeters.

The work was created during the winter of 1934. Hopper writes in his poem about this painting that "only the grass, the uncut dead grass, shows where the wind is."

The view of the Weehawken street remains mostly unchanged. In 2013, Weehawken resident and comedian Susie Felber commissioned a modern remake of the painting in order to raise money for the Weehawken PTPO (a parent–teacher participating association). The remake, which was created by Brooklyn-based painter Stephen Gardner, depicts the scene as it appears now, with flowers and satellite dishes, and in lighter tones. Gardner's derivative painting was purchased on eBay for $510 by computer programmer Ligia Builes, who owns the house depicted in the painting.

== Provenance ==
Hopper made at least eight sketches for the painting which he delivered to his gallerist Frank K.M. Rehn in April 1934. The studies are part of the collection at the Whitney Museum to which Hopper, before his death, decided to leave his unsold work.

East Wind Over Weehawken was included in the 1950 Hopper retrospective at the Whitney (New York), Museum of Fine Arts (Boston), and the Detroit Institute of Arts while still in the possession of Frank K.M. Rehn Galleries. It was acquired by the Pennsylvania Academy of Fine Arts directly from the gallery in 1952, fifteen years before the death of the painter, at a very low price.

In 2013 the Pennsylvania Academy put the painting up for sale in the hopes of garnering the $22–$28 million at which the painting was valued, which it intended to use to establish an endowment. About twenty five percent of the fund will be dedicated to filling gaps in the collection of historic art. The remainder will be used for new investments in contemporary art of undetermined value, with hopes for dramatic increases in the future.

The painting sold for $36 million ($40.5 million with fees) at Christie's in New York to an anonymous telephone bidder. This was a record for a Hopper work until the sale of Chop Suey for nearly $92 million in 2018. The previous record, for Hotel Window sold in 2009, was $26.9 million.

== See also ==
- List of works by Edward Hopper
- American realism
