= Racetrack Section, North Bergen =

Populated place in Hudson County, New Jersey, US

Racetrack, North Bergen
- Unincorporated community
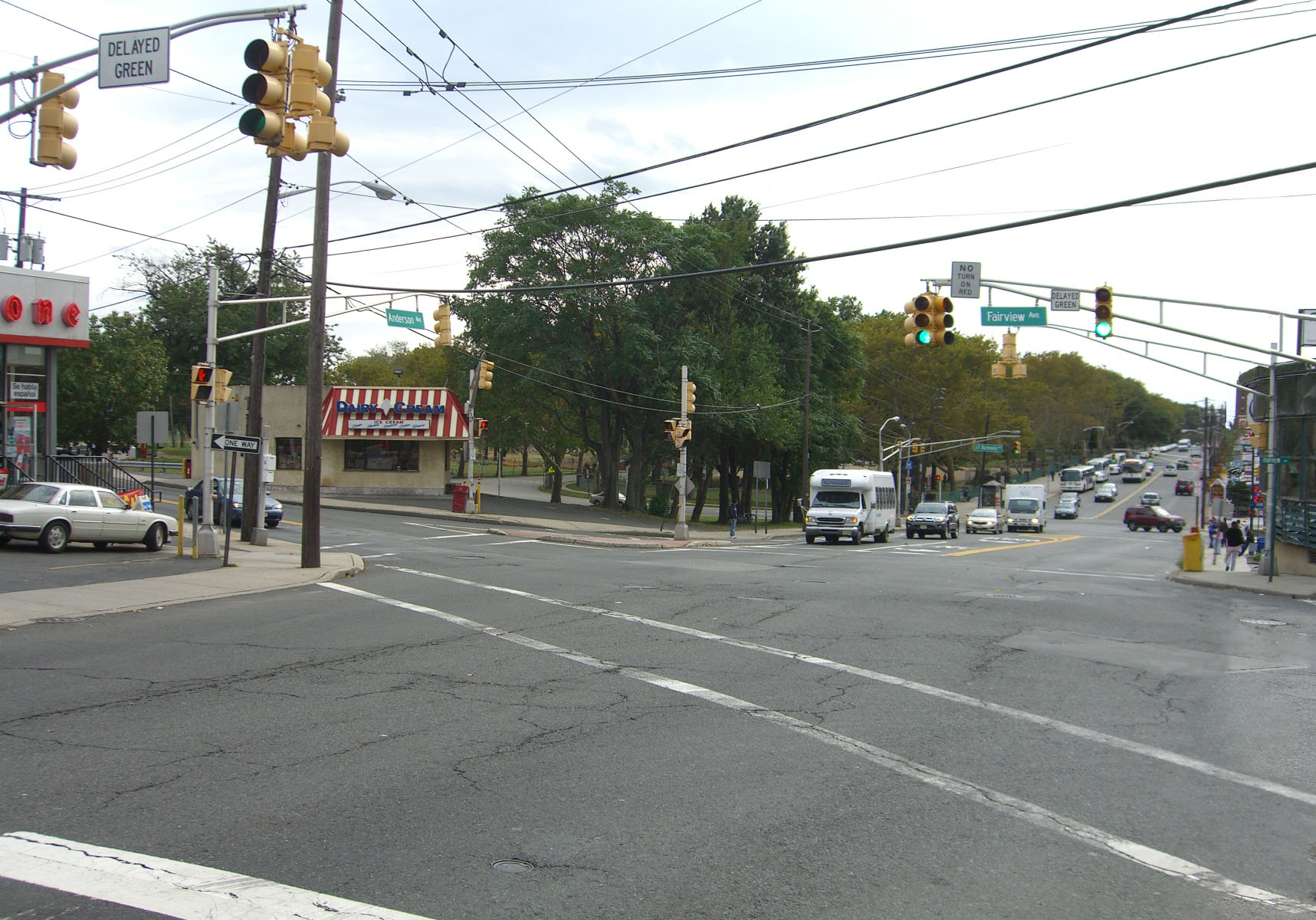
- Nungesser's, at the intersection of Bergenline Avenue and Woodcliff Avenue

- Location of Racetrack in Hudson County Inset: Location of county within the state of New Jersey
- Coordinates: 40°48′25″N 74°00′14″W
- Country: United States
- State: New Jersey
- County: Hudson
- Township: North Bergen
- Elevation: 217 ft (66 m)
- Postal code: 07047
- Area code: 201
- GNIS feature ID: 882893

The Racetrack Section, also known as Hudson Heights, is a neighborhood of North Bergen Township in Hudson County, in the U.S. state of New Jersey. It is a mostly residential district between Bergenline and Kennedy Boulevard. Its east–west streets follow the numbering of other North Hudson towns while its north–south streets are called avenues and are numbered First, Second, Third, Fourth, and Fifth. Located on the plateau of the Hudson Palisades (which begin their descent at the Boulevard) the Racetrack Section consists of mostly one and two family homes and enjoys convenient public transportation, a stable population, and proximity to North Bergen Public Library, North Bergen High School, North Hudson Park and Woodcliff.

The neighborhood takes its name from Nungesser's Guttenberg Racetrack. The racetrack located in the area was a popular with day-trippers from New York (who traveled by streetcar from the elevator at the Weehawken Ferry) during the latter part of the 19th century, until gaming was outlawed by the New Jersey legislature in 1893. While the tracks closed, the area remained an amusement park known as Little Coney Island. The "pleasure resort" as it was known, gained a reputation as attracting a similarly rowdy crowd as the racetrack, and reported incidents of alcohol being served to children and women being drugged. The recently invented ice cream cone was popularized at the park. The track was later used as a roadhouse for automobilists until the former clubhouse burned down in 1910. The site became a known landing spot for early aviators. The land on which the racetrack had been was subdivided in 1919, and later was built upon creating the section which exists today. White Castle, an early drive-in fast-food chain, has long been located in the neighborhood.

The district is still sometimes called Hudson Heights or Nungesser's, which is more commonly used to describe the intersection and transportation hub at the northwest corner of North Hudson Park, at the Bergen line with Fairview border.

== See also ==
List of neighborhoods in North Bergen, New Jersey
