= Bergenline Avenue station =

Light rail station in Union City, New Jersey, US

Bergenline Avenue
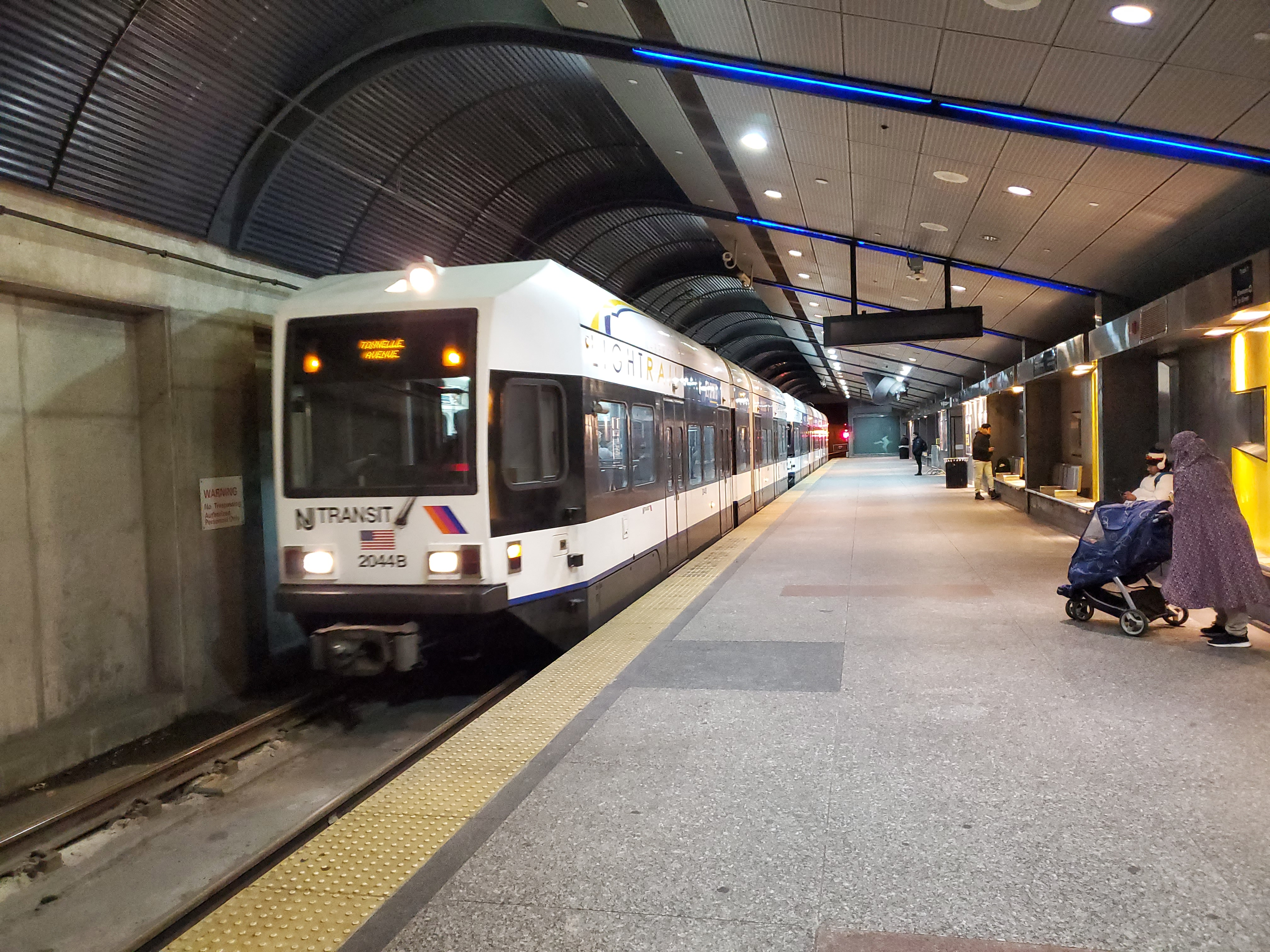
- A northbound train at the station in 2024

General information
- Location: Bergenline Avenue between 48th and 49th Streets; Union City, New Jersey
- Coordinates: 40°46′55″N 74°01′19″W
- Owner: New Jersey Transit
- Platforms: 1 island platform
- Tracks: 2
- Connections: NJ Transit Bus: 22, 84, 86, 89, 156, 159, 181

Construction
- Cycle facilities: Yes
- Accessible: Yes

Other information
- Fare zone: 1

History
- Opened: February 25, 2006

Passengers
- 2025: 3,025(average weekday)
- Rank: 5 of 23

Services
Preceding station	NJ Transit	Following station
Port Imperial toward West Side Avenue	West Side–Tonnelle	Tonnelle Avenue Terminus
Port Imperial toward Hoboken	Hoboken–Tonnelle	Tonnelle Avenue Terminus
Location

Bergenline Avenue is a station on the Hudson–Bergen Light Rail (HBLR). The intermodal facility is located on 49th Street between Bergenline Avenue and Kennedy Boulevard in Union City, New Jersey, near its border with West New York and North Bergen. The station opened on February 25, 2006.

Bergenline Avenue is the only stop in the HBLR system with an underground platform. Located 160 feet below the Hudson Palisades in the former Weehawken Terminal tunnel of the West Shore Railroad, it is reached by elevators traveling from street-level entrances located just north of bus bays. The station was designed by FXFOWLE Architects. The four porcelain enamel on steel murals that adorn the complex are entitled Between Manhattan and Meadowlands, and were created by Maria Mijares.
