= Boulevard East =

County road in New Jersey, U.S.

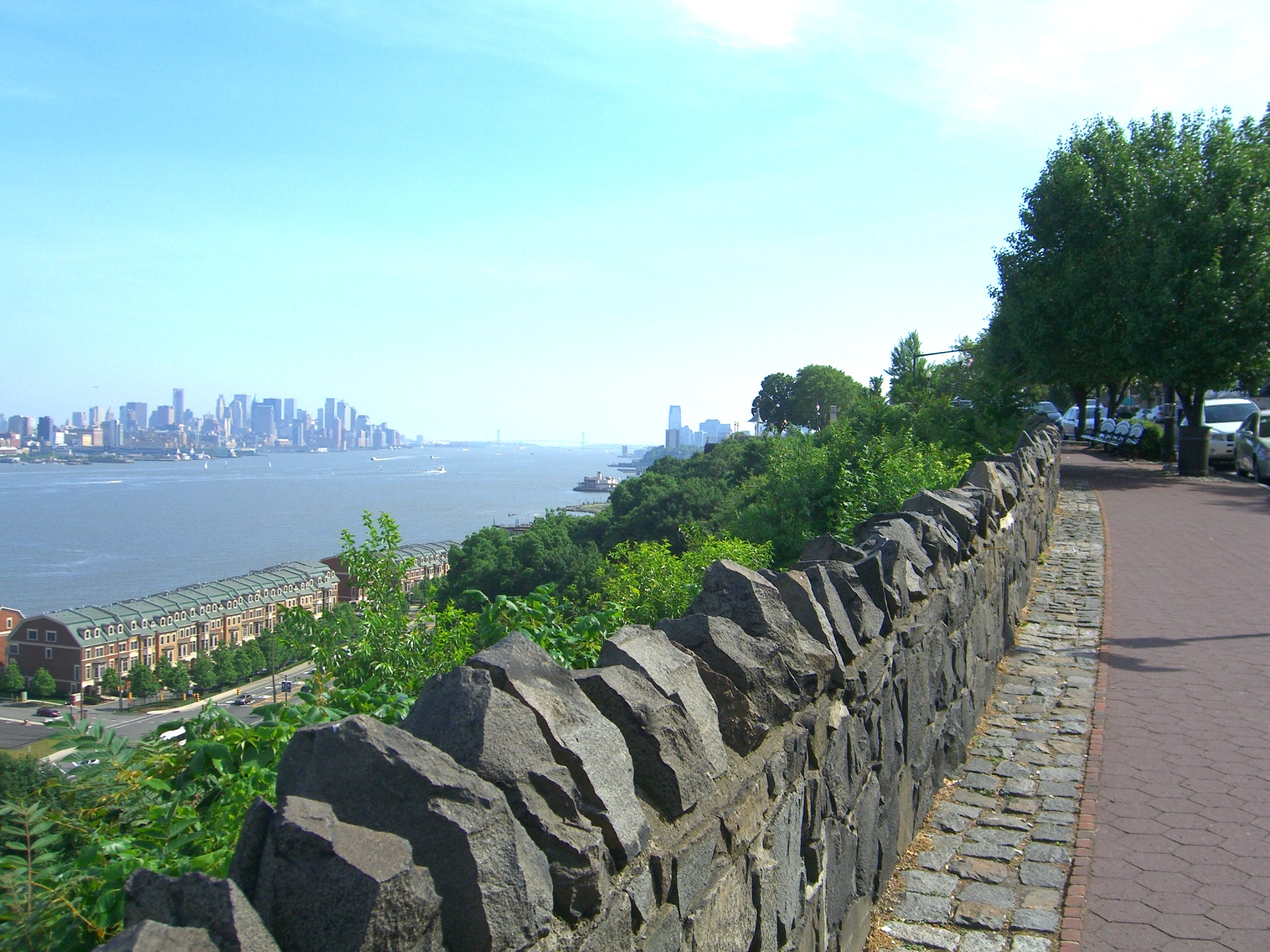
View facing south from Columbia Terrace in Weehawken. Much of the overlook is lined with trap rock quarried from the cliffs.

Boulevard East (officially John F. Kennedy Boulevard East, and sometimes referred to as JFK Boulevard East) is a two-way, mostly two lane, scenic county road in the municipalities of Weehawken, West New York, Guttenberg and North Bergen in North Hudson, New Jersey. Apart from small sections at either end, the road runs along the crest of the Hudson Palisades, affording it views of the Hudson River and the New York City skyline. Developed at the turn of the 20th century, the residential road is characterized by an eclectic mix of 20th-century architecture, including private homes as well as mid and high-rise apartment buildings, mostly on its western side, with a promenade and parks along its eastern side. It is also the setting for Edward Hopper's 1934 painting East Wind Over Weehawken, which is considered one of his best works.

== History ==
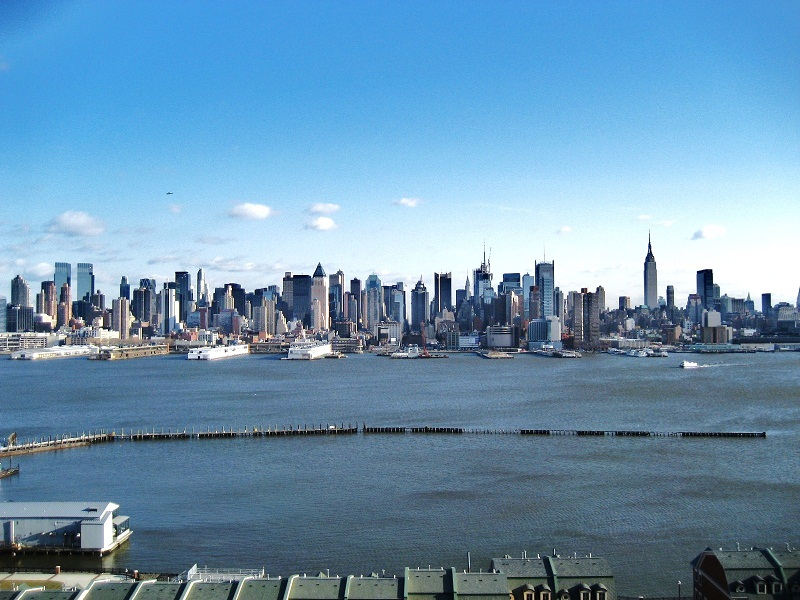
The view from Boulevard East is recognized worldwide.

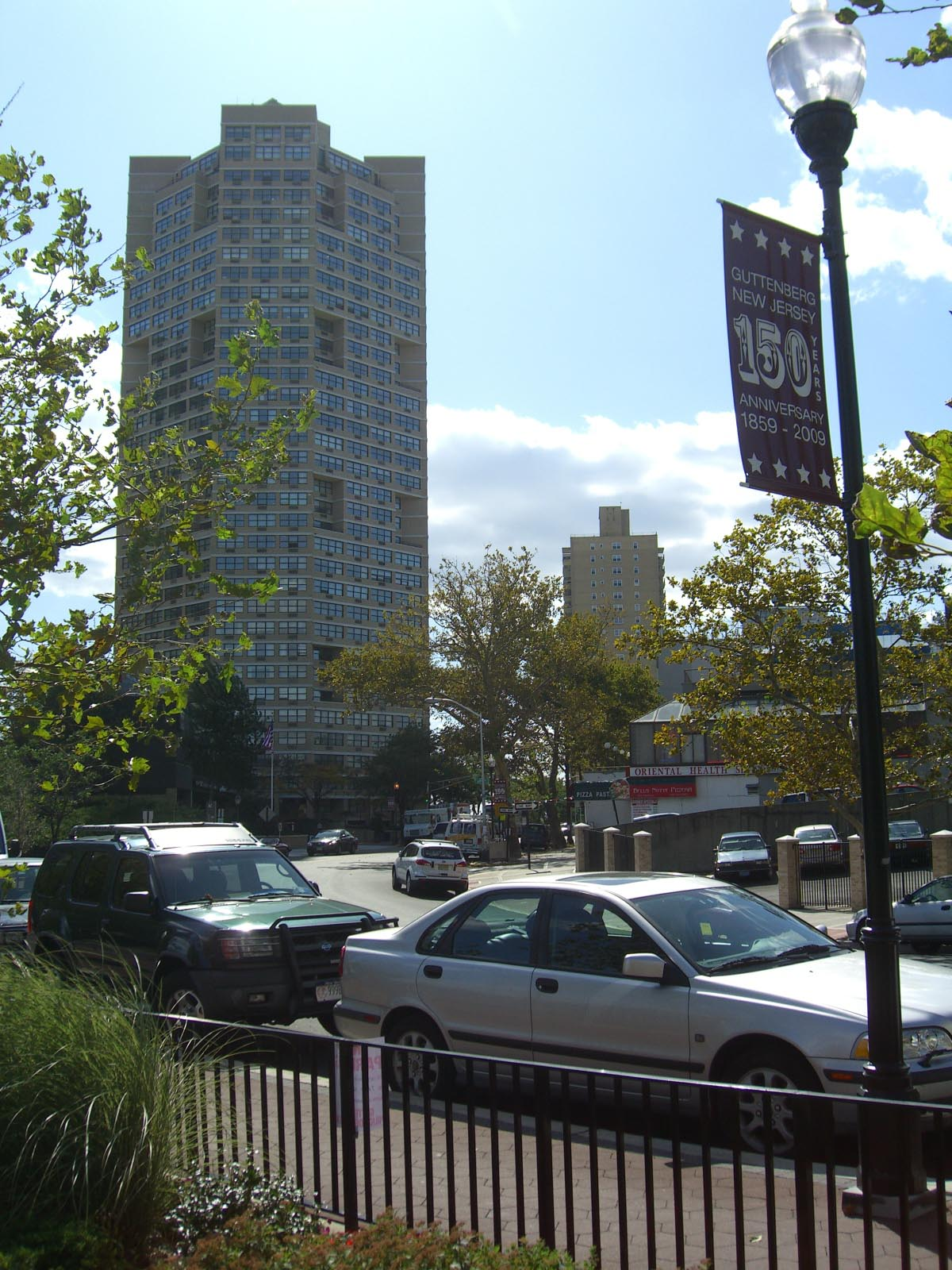
The Boulevard winds its way along the top of the Hudson Palisades as seen looking south in Guttenberg.

Boulevard East runs along the crest of the Hudson Palisades. It is so named in reference to the other major boulevard in Hudson County to which it is connected, Kennedy Boulevard. Prior to being renamed in honor of John F. Kennedy in the 1960s, the street was known as Hudson Boulevard. While there was discussion of building a county long road as early as the 1870s, parts of Hudson County Boulevard were officially opened in 1896. By 1913 it was completed, and considered to be fine for "motoring". Taken as a single road, the circuitous route of west and east sections of the entire boulevard runs from the southern tip of the county at Bergen Point to its northern border with Bergen County and south again to the Hoboken city line. In local nomenclature, signage, addresses, transportation, and postal delivery, the name Boulevard East is used.

== Route description ==
Much of Boulevard East runs parallel to the edge of a sheer escarpment and offers expansive views the iconographic Manhattan skyline. Since 2009, when Macy's began to launch its annual Fourth of July fireworks from the Hudson River, portions of the Boulevard are closed to allow spectators to view the display. The Boulevard was proposed to be part of the Port Imperial Street Circuit of the Grand Prix of America.

The southern end of the road is an important component of local access to the Lincoln Tunnel, running past its Art Deco toll plaza and passing twice under the Lincoln Tunnel Helix, which carries New Jersey Route 495 and descends to meet it. Entering a residential district of Weehawken the boulevard steeply ascends northward until reaching the Boulevard Curve where it curves east, then north again and begins travelling along the edge of the Hudson Palisades. Just to the south of the curve is the Hamilton Memorial, relocated from the Burr–Hamilton duel site at the foot of the cliffs below Kings Bluff, named for James Gore King whose 19th century estate, Highwood, once stood there, and is now a residential neighborhood.

The road then passes Hamilton Plaza where for a brief time in the 1890s stood El Dorado, a pleasure garden offering theatrical spectacles, casinos, and exotic gardens. At Liberty Place it crosses over a now defunct cut through which once ran streetcars operated by North Hudson County Railway that connected to a massive elevator and ferries at Weehawken Terminal. Pershing Road is one of the few roads which connect the waterfront to the Boulevard and the top of the cliffs, and was once part of the Lincoln Highway. At the southwest corner of 49th Street stands the gabled house depicted in East Wind Over Weehawken, a 1934 painting by Edward Hopper, which is considered one of his best works.

Old Glory Park is near the town line of West New York where of the much boulevard is abutted by parks and scenic overlooks. A statue of Thomas M. Donnelly, instrumental in the preservation of the Palisades, is located in the park named for him. The trap rock walls that line much of the overlook come from quarry operations that he and the NJ Federation of Women's Clubs were able curtail at the beginning of the 20th century. 60th Street, the main crosstown street for the town became Hillside Road (officially renamed for Anthony DeFino, who was mayor for 24 years) connecting the boulevard to River Road. One of the few residential neighborhoods on the cliff side of the boulevard is found north of the major crossroad at one of its more severe curves. It is here that the road reaches a height of nearly 260 feet near the highest point in Hudson County. The park on 60th Street features a fountain erected in tribute to the victims of the September 11 Attacks.

The three block section of the boulevard in Guttenberg is dominated by the Galaxy Towers, a Brutalist trio of octagonal buildings, which rise from the foot of the palisades and soar above them. Ferry Road passes underneath the complex. The Woodcliff Section of North Bergen, once known as Hudson Heights, is characterized by a combination of family homes and modernist high-rises, notably the cylindrical Stonehenge. Near the point where the road bears west and enters North Hudson Park the original Bulls Ferry Road makes a steep descent to the east. It is in the park, also named for famous son James J. Braddock, that Boulevard East intersects with Palisades Avenue, which continues north along the cliffs, and soon after ends at Bergenline in Nungessers.

There are numerous bridges along Boulevard East crossing over clefts in the cliffs, many approaching 100 years in age. A portion of the road was closed for six months in 2013 to replace one located in North Bergen.

== Transportation ==
John F. Kennedy Boulevard East
- Boulevard East
- Interactive map of John F. Kennedy Boulevard East
- Former names: Hudson County Boulevard; Hudson Boulevard
- Part of: CR 677 / CR 505 / CR 693
- Namesake: Henry Hudson; John F. Kennedy
- Length: 4.7 mi (7.6 km)
- Location: North Hudson, Hudson County, New Jersey
- Nearest metro station: Lincoln Harbor, Port Imperial (Hudson–Bergen Light Rail)
- Coordinates: 40°47′07″N 74°00′31″W
- South end: CR 677 in Weehawken
- Major junctions: Route 495 in Weehawken
- North end: Route 63 / CR 501 in North Bergen

Construction
- Construction start: 1896
- Completion: 1913

Boulevard East carries three county route designations. County Route 677 begins as Park Avenue in Hoboken, becoming Boulevard East after crossing the viaduct over the Hudson Bergen Light Rail tracks. At Highwood Terrace in Weehawken it becomes part of County Route 505. From 60th Street in West New York it is designated County Route 693 until joining its western counterpart, designated County Route 501. In total the route is slightly more than three miles long.

Addresses ascend from the first at number 300. In Weehawken the numbers rise to 1055. At the border with West New York at 51st Street, the addresses jump to 5101, following the custom of taking the building number from the lower cross street. This system was jointly adopted by the North Hudson towns after streets were re-numbered after the opening of the Lincoln Tunnel in 1937.

New Jersey Transit bus routes 128, 165, 166, 168 travel along the boulevard between the Port Authority Bus Terminal and locations in Bergen County. NJT 23 provides local service. Dollar vans, many of which originate at Nungesser's, also travel along the street to 42nd Street in Manhattan. Pershing Road and public stairs connect the road to Weehawken Port Imperial, where ferries and light rail are available.

=== Major intersections ===
The entire route is in Hudson County.

Location	mi	km	Destinations	Notes
Weehawken	0.00	0.00	CR 677 south (Park Avenue) / 19th Street – Lincoln Tunnel	CR 677 continues south
Weehawken	0.20	0.32	Lincoln Tunnel (Route 495 east) – New York City	Southbound exit only; former I-495
Weehawken	0.60	0.97	Route 495 west to N.J. Turnpike (I-95) / Route 3 west	Interchange; former I-495
Weehawken	0.90	1.45	Highwood Terrace	Route transitions from CR 677 to CR 505
Weehawken	1.60	2.57	Pershing Road (CR 682 east)	Western terminus of CR 682
West New York	2.20	3.54	CR 505 north (Defino Way)	Route transition from CR 505 to CR 693
North Bergen	4.60	7.40	Bergenline Avenue	Nungessers
North Bergen	4.70	7.56	CR 501 south (Kennedy Boulevard) / Route 63 north (Bergen Boulevard / CR 501 north)	Southern terminus of Route 63
1.000 mi = 1.609 km; 1.000 km = 0.621 mi: Incomplete access; Route transition

== Gallery ==
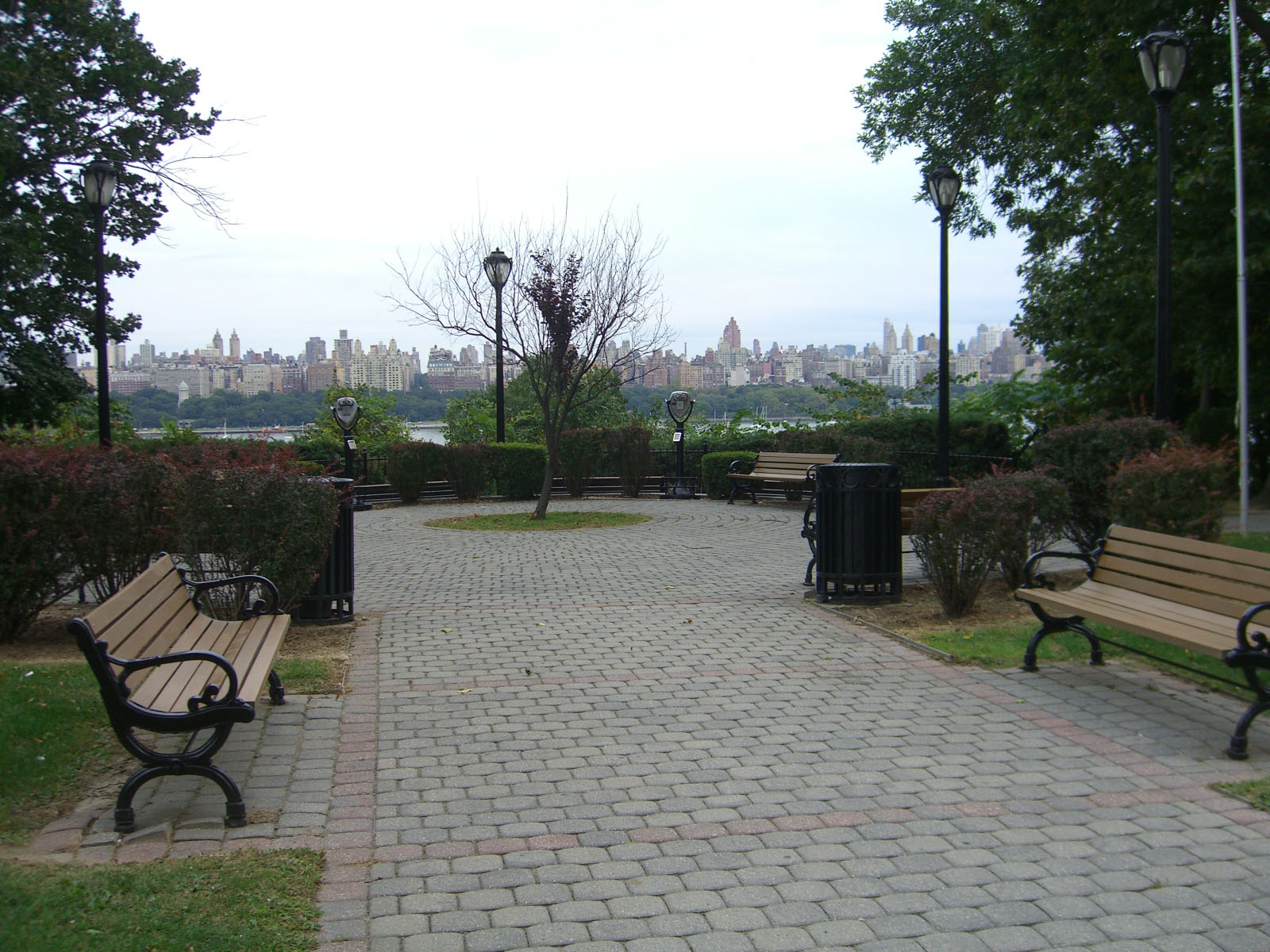
The thoroughfare is lined with many parks and scenic outlooks.

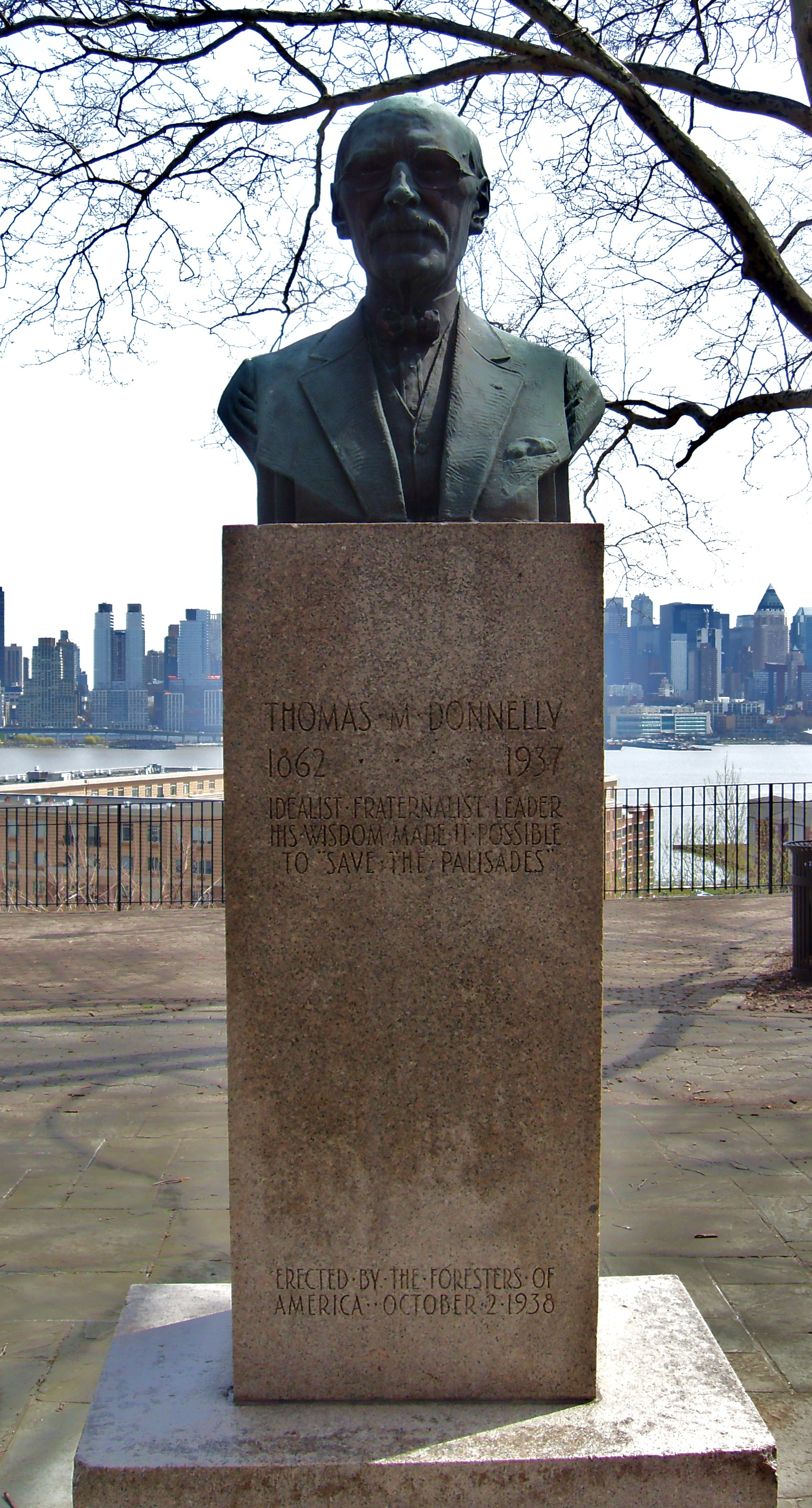
Bust of Thomas M. Donnelly, whose contributions helped save the Palisades

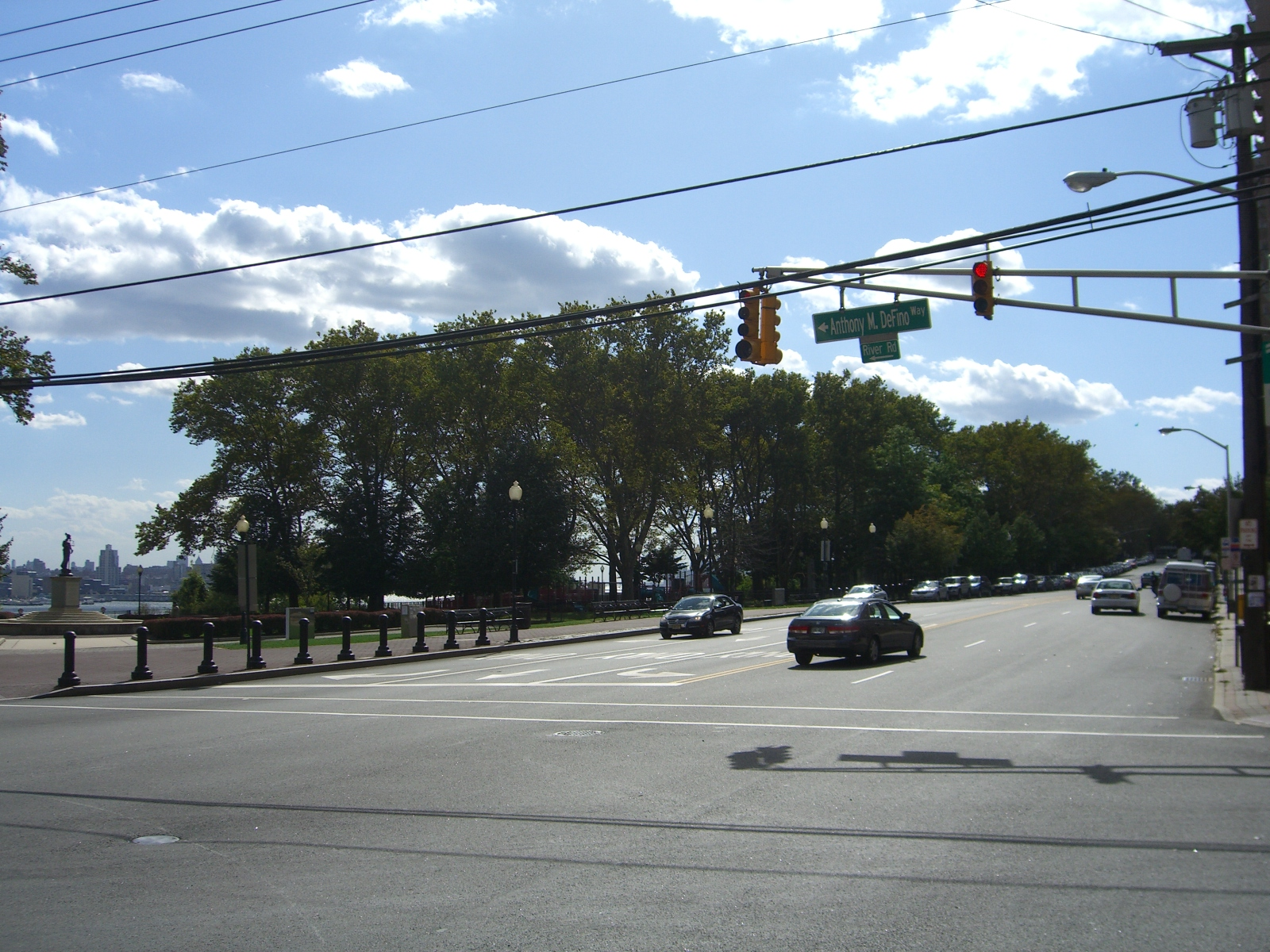
In West New York at 60th Street, one of the few streets which connects it to the Hudson River waterfront

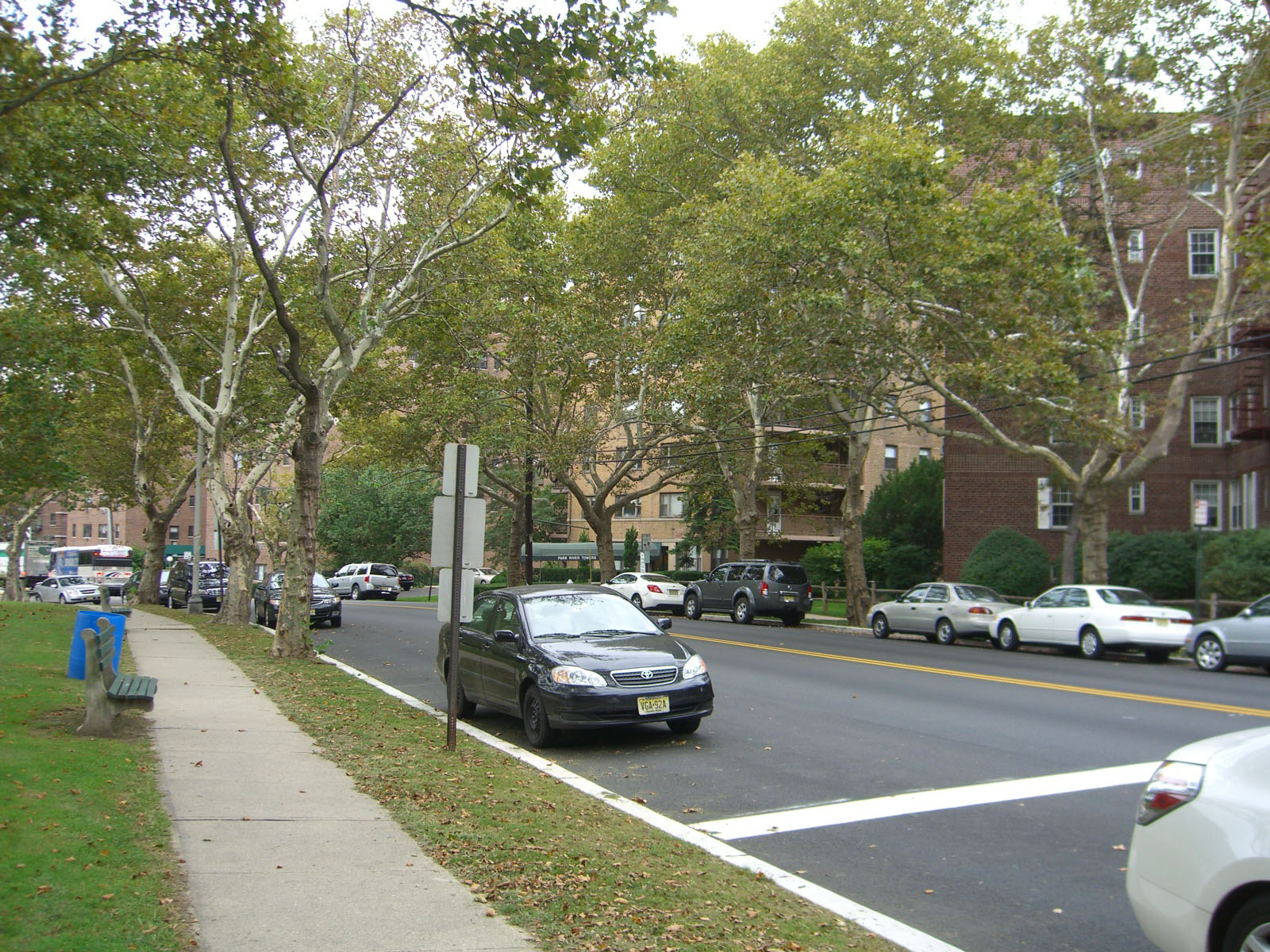
Apartment buildings and promenade in North Bergen

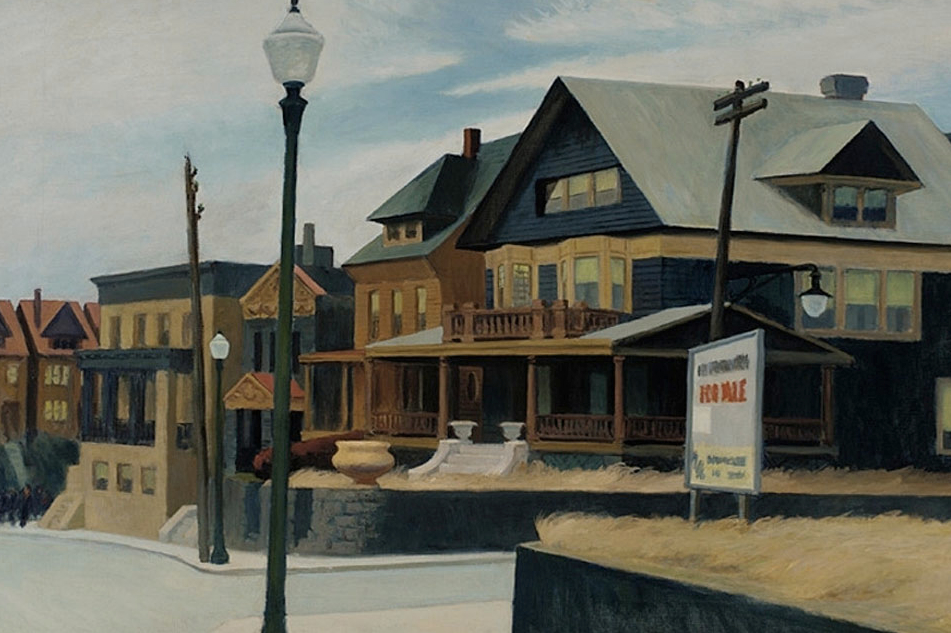
East Wind Over Weehawken by Edward Hopper

== See also ==
- Hudson River Park, which has a Boulevard East and a Boulevard West
