= Bergenline Avenue =

Street in Hudson County, New Jersey, US

- Havana on the Hudson; Miracle Mile
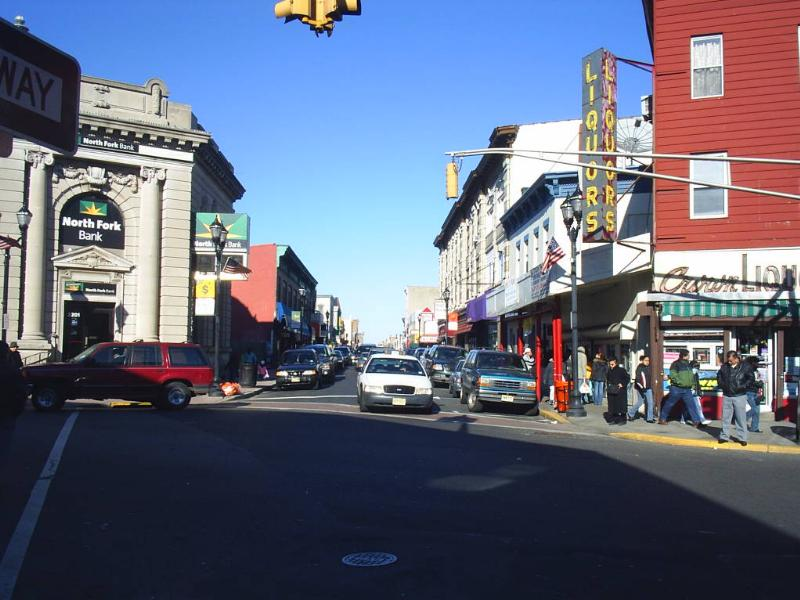
- Facing north at 32nd Street in Union City
- Part of: CR 721
- Length: 4.4 mi (7.1 km)
- Location: Hudson County, New Jersey
- Nearest metro station: Bergenline Avenue (Hudson–Bergen Light Rail)
- Coordinates: 40.7535°N 74.0415°W
- South end: 2nd Street in Union City
- Major junctions: CR 693 in North Bergen
- North end: Anderson Avenue in Fairview

Bergenline Avenue is a major commercial district in the North Hudson section of Hudson County, New Jersey, United States. The north–south street passes through Union City, West New York, Guttenberg, and North Bergen. Its southern end is at Union City's Second Street, the north boundary of Washington Park. From there north to 47th Street, the street is one-way southbound; New York Avenue and Kennedy Boulevard serve northbound traffic. Between 48th and 49th Streets, elevators on the west side provide access to the underground Bergenline Avenue station of the Hudson-Bergen Light Rail. After passing through West New York and Guttenberg and into North Bergen, the street meets North Hudson Park, running along its west side from 79th Street to the Bergen County line through the community of Nungesser's and crosses Kennedy Boulevard. The northernmost 0.04 miles (0.064 km) of the route from Kennedy Boulevard to the Bergen County line is designated as County Route 721. North of the county line the street name becomes Anderson Avenue, which is the major commercial district for Fairview, Cliffside Park, and Fort Lee.

== Route description ==
Currently the longest commercial avenue in the state, boasting over 300 retail stores and restaurants, many of which became the outlet for Cuban entrepreneurs who had immigrated to Union City, and West New York, for which the thoroughfare became known as "Havana on the Hudson". Also known as the "Miracle Mile", Bergenline's largest concentration of retail and chain stores begins at the intersection of 32nd Street and continues north until 92nd Street in North Bergen, and while it is a narrow one-way, southbound street throughout most of Union City, it becomes a four lane, two-way street at 48th Street, just one block south of the town's limit. It is used as the route for local parades, including the annual Memorial Day Parade, Cuban Day Parade, and Dominican-American Parade.

The 4.4 mile portion of the street that run through North Bergen, Guttenberg, West New York, and Union City is home to early 300 restaurants, cafes, bakeries, delis, and markets. Most of these are small businesses, and feature cuisine from 28 nationalities, including Mexican, Cuban, Dominican, Salvadoran, Argentinian, Brazilian, Ecuadorian, Uruguayan, Venezuelan, Colombian, Chilean, Russian, Italian, Chinese, and Thai.

The street is also a major transportation corridor, served by New Jersey Transit buses to local points (22, 22X, 84, 86, and 89) and to the Port Authority Bus Terminal (156 and 159) and George Washington Bridge Bus Terminal (181) in Manhattan. The portion along the west side of North Hudson Park sees almost 300 buses in each direction on a normal weekday, an average of one every five minutes.

== History ==
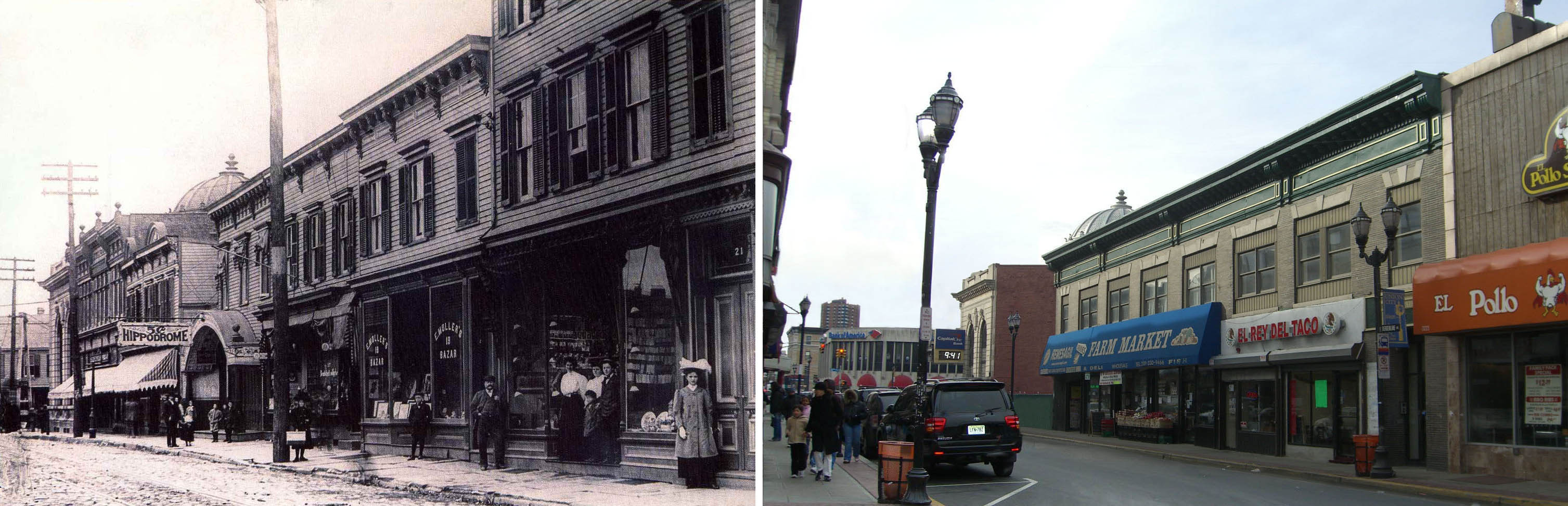
Bergenline Avenue then and now: Facing south toward 32nd Street, circa 1900 (left), and in 2010 (right).

Originally, Bergenline Avenue was the width of a cowpath, and was not regarded as a business center. Street car tracks were expected to be laid on Palisade Avenue, where the Union Hill's Town Hall was located. However, an influential citizen named Henry Kohlmeier, who had just built his residence on Palisade Avenue, did not wish to be disturbed by the noise of the passing cars, and proposed that the tracks be laid on Bergenline Avenue, two blocks to the west, and before those who would have objected to this became aware of this change, the motion was approved. The continuous line of retail stores that appeared Bergenline Avenue made it a major shopping thoroughfare for North Hudson County, one of the leading shopping centers in Northern New Jersey, and the longest commercial avenue in the state.

By the early part of the twentieth century, Bergenline Avenue was an Italian-American strip, but by 1981 it was predominantly Cuban. Likened to a "Miracle Mile", the aforementioned portion of Bergenline Avenue that ran from Union City through North Bergen was a popular commercial district where Consumers Distributing and Woolworth's were among the shopping choices for residents and visitors, before the rise in popularity of shopping malls. By the early 2000s it remained the heart of the Cuban-American community in North Hudson, and home to many other Hispanics. Among members of that community, it earned the nickname La Avenida.

== Notable residents ==
- Esther Salas, the first Hispanic woman to serve as a United States magistrate judge in the District of New Jersey, and the first Hispanic woman to be appointed a U.S. District Court judge in New Jersey.
- Erick Morillo (1971–2020), DJ and music producer known for the single "I Like to Move It", grew up in an apartment at 1406 Bergenline. That portion of Bergenline, between 14th and 15th Streets, was renamed in his honor on October 12, 2012.
