= New Jersey Route 495 =

State highway in Hudson County, New Jersey

Route 495
- Lincoln Tunnel Approach

Route information
- Maintained by NJTA, NJDOT, PANYNJ
- Length: 3.45 mi (5.55 km)
- Existed: 1959 (1937 as Route 3)–present
- Restrictions: No hazardous goods in Lincoln Tunnel

Major junctions
- West end: I-95 / N.J. Turnpike in Secaucus
- US 1-9 / Route 3 in North Bergen; CR 501 in Union City
- East end: NY 495 at the New York state line in Weehawken

Location
- Country: United States
- State: New Jersey
- Counties: Hudson

Highway system
- New Jersey State Highway Routes; Interstate; US; State; Scenic Byways
← Route 446X	→ I-676

Route 495 is a 3.45-mile-long (5.55 km) freeway in Hudson County, New Jersey, in the United States that connects the New Jersey Turnpike (Interstate 95) at exits 16E-17 in Secaucus to New York State Route 495 (NY 495) inside the Lincoln Tunnel in Weehawken, providing access to Midtown Manhattan in New York City. The road is owned and operated by the New Jersey Turnpike Authority (NJTA) between the New Jersey Turnpike and Route 3, the New Jersey Department of Transportation (NJDOT) between Route 3 and Park Avenue near the Union City–Weehawken border, and by the Port Authority of New York and New Jersey (PANYNJ) east of Park Avenue, including the helix viaduct used to descend the New Jersey Palisades to reach the entrance of the Lincoln Tunnel. Route 495 is mostly a six-lane freeway with a reversible bus lane used during the morning rush hour. The bus lane, which runs the entire length of the freeway, continues into the Lincoln Tunnel's center tube.

The first portion of the present-day Route 495, at the entrance to the Lincoln Tunnel, was constructed in 1937 when the Lincoln Tunnel opened. In 1939, the section known as The Helix was finished, which is an oval-shaped loop that descends Route 495 down to the entrance of the tunnel. In that same year, the route’s path was extended west to Route 3 and it became an eastern extension of that route. In 1952, the portion of the route west of Route 3 was opened when the New Jersey Turnpike was completed. In 1959, the road was incorporated into the Interstate Highway System and was designated as part of Interstate 495 (I-495). Since the Mid-Manhattan Expressway that would have connected the route to New York's I-495 (Long Island Expressway) was canceled, I-495 officially became New Jersey Route 495 in 1979, and the signs were changed in 1989.

== Route description ==
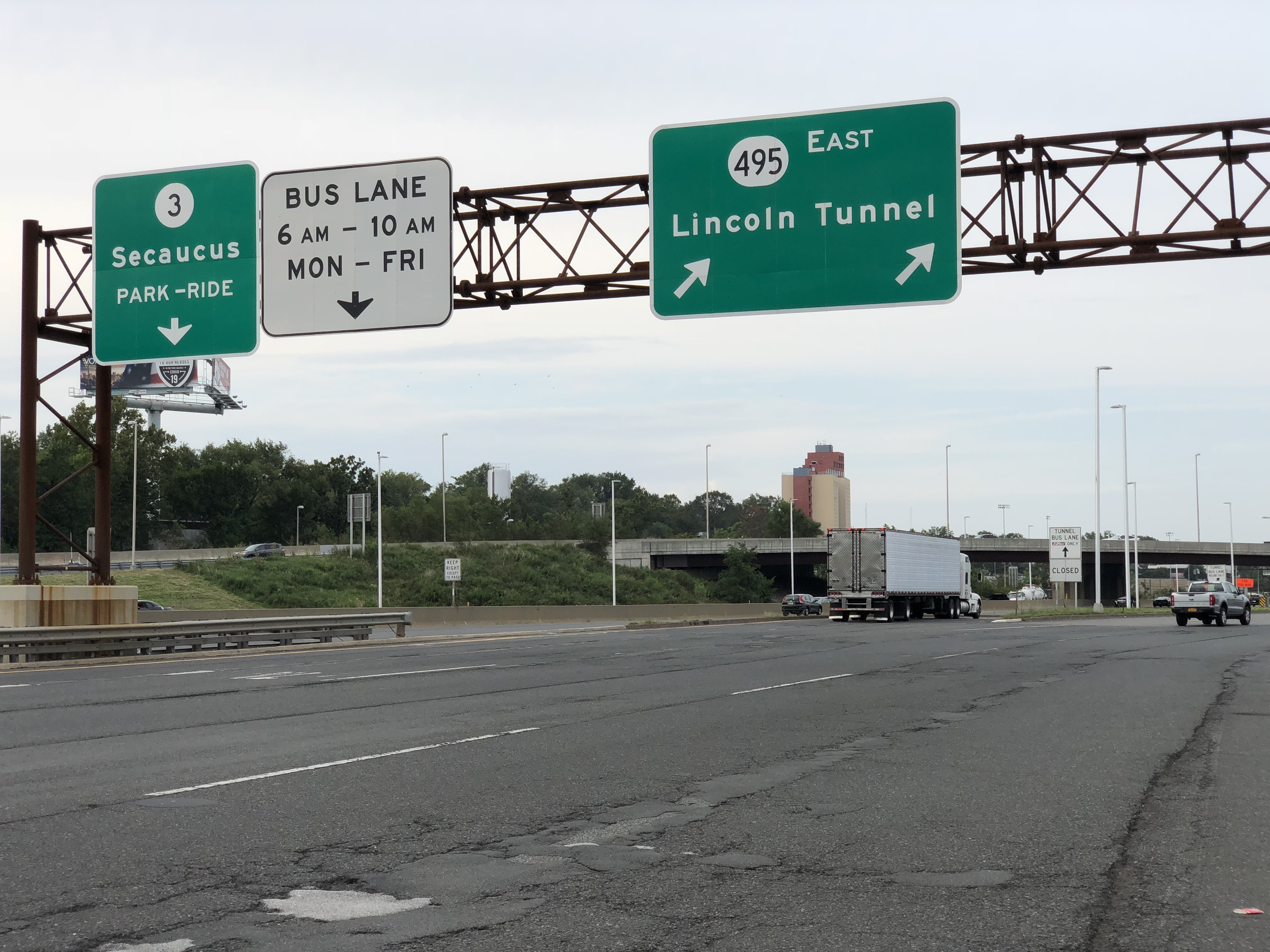
The beginning of eastbound Route 495 at the New Jersey Turnpike

Route 495 officially begins at the exit 16E off-ramp from the northbound lanes of the New Jersey Turnpike near the boundary of Secaucus and North Bergen. The main roadway heads east through North Bergen as a six-lane freeway maintained by the NJTA. The route has an interchange with Route 3, with access to eastbound Route 3 and U.S. Route 1/9 (US 1/9) for traffic in the eastbound direction and to westbound Route 3 in the westbound direction, a major intersection for Route 495 and Route 3, as many people use Route 3 to get to Route 495 for the Lincoln Tunnel. Route 3 ends almost immediately after its interchange with Route 495, at US 1/9. The three routes form a triangular-like junction, however, Route 495 doesn’t have direct access to US 1/9; instead drivers must take the Route 3 exit to get there. Past this interchange, Route 495 becomes a six-lane freeway maintained by NJDOT that passes over New York, Susquehanna and Western Railway's New Jersey Subdivision line and Conrail Shared Assets Operations' Northern Branch line before intersects US 1/9 at a partial interchange, with a westbound exit and eastbound entrance. Past US 1/9, the freeway has an interchange with County Route 501 (CR 501, John F. Kennedy Boulevard), which uses 30th Street and 31st Street as collector–distributor roads. East of this junction, Route 495 enters Union City and heads through developed residential areas, passing under numerous streets. It enters Weehawken and comes to a westbound exit and eastbound entrance for Park Avenue, which provides access to Weehawken and Hoboken, where Route 495 becomes maintained by the PANYNJ.

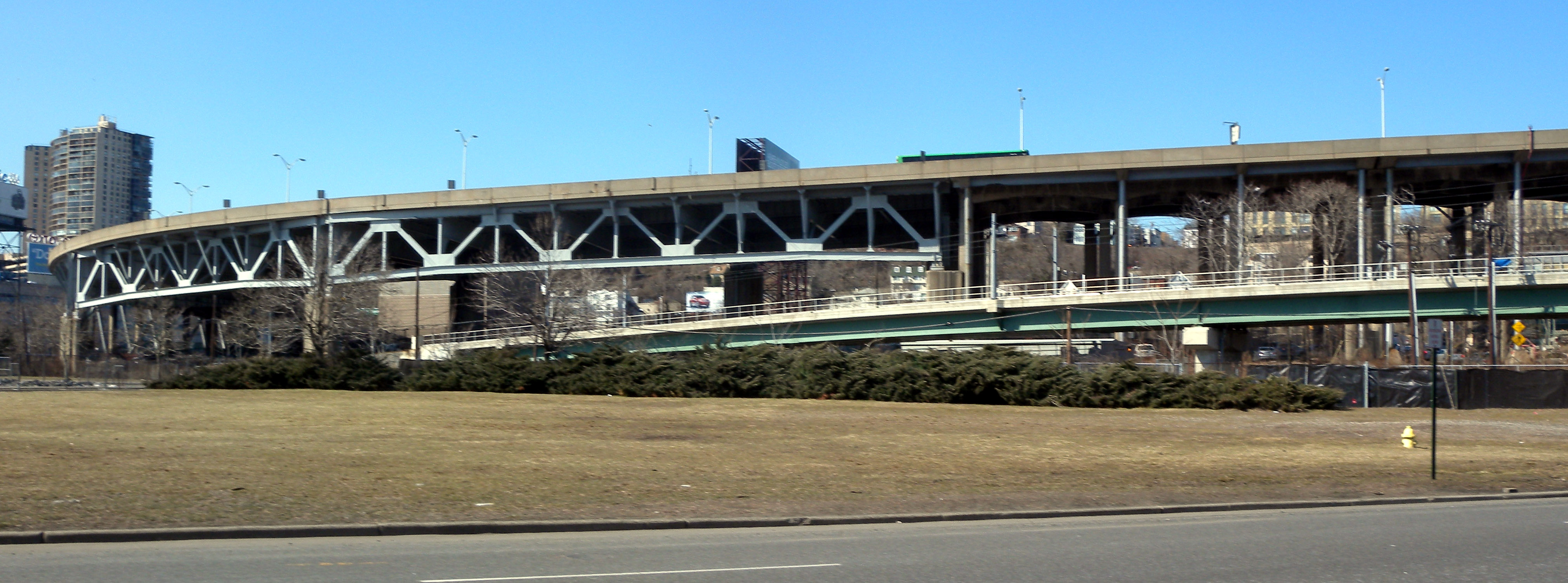
The Helix, from east

At this point, the highway loops around itself at a section of the highway locally known as The Helix, descending the New Jersey Palisades on a 360 degree looped spiral bridge to reach the entrance to the Lincoln Tunnel under the Hudson River. At the start of the Helix, Route 495 passes Weehawken stadium to the north and east, and would later go under it at the start of the Lincoln Tunnel. The route has a westbound exit and eastbound entrance for and from CR 677 (John F. Kennedy/Hudson Boulevard East). After interchanging with Boulevard East, the road enters the Lincoln Tunnel. At the New York state line, which is located at the midpoint of the Hudson River, the road continues as NY 495, which is separate from I-495, and heads into Midtown Manhattan in New York City.

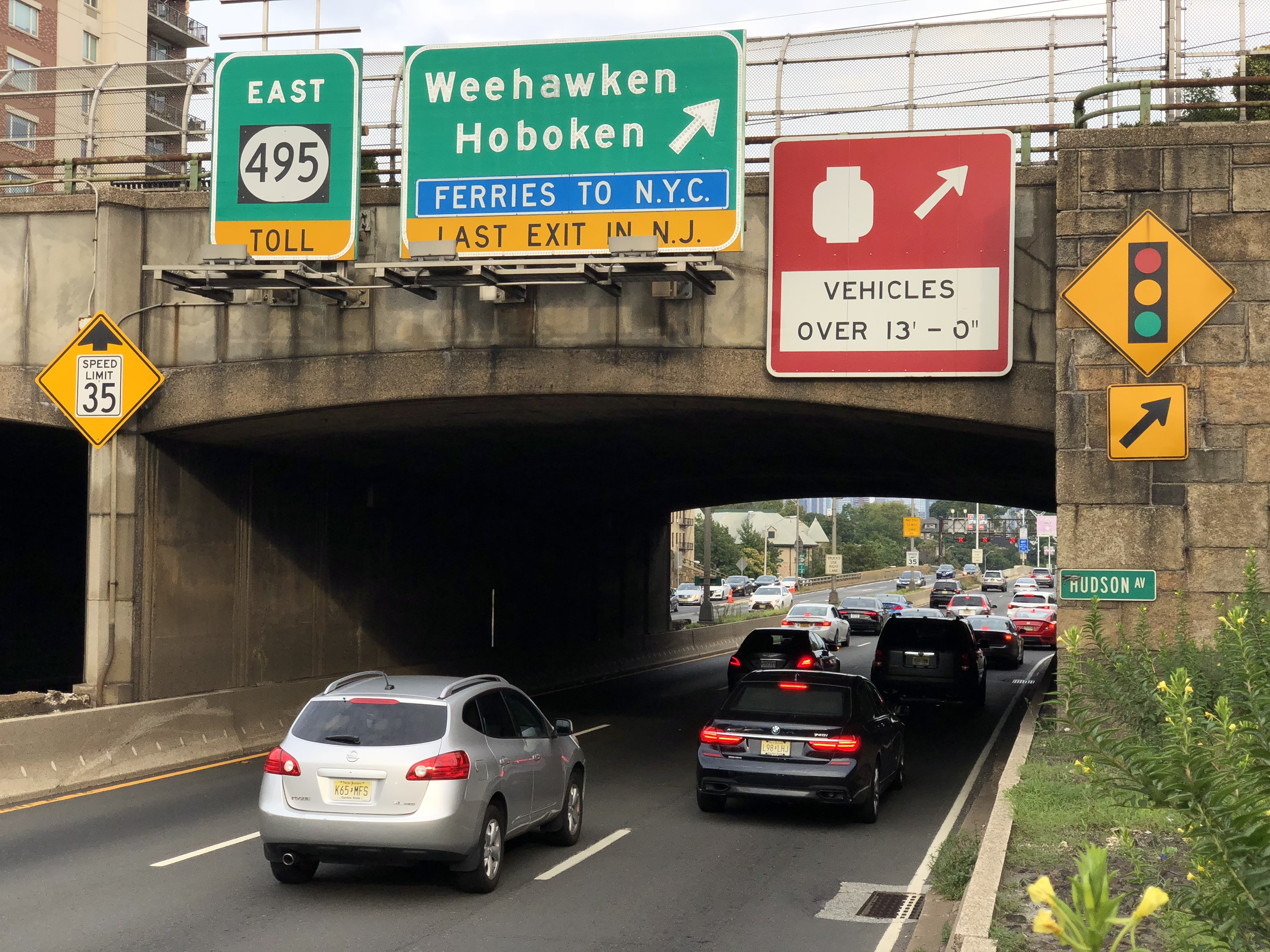
View east along Route 495 at Hudson Avenue in Union City

Since 1970, the left lane of the three westbound lanes is converted during the morning rush hour to a reversible bus lane, known as the "Exclusive Bus Lane" (XBL). The Port Authority is responsible for daily operation of the XBL, including its opening and closing, removal of disabled vehicles, and response to emergencies. It is used by buses headed east from the New Jersey Turnpike and Route 3, mainly to the Port Authority Bus Terminal just past the Lincoln Tunnel in Manhattan, serving over 1,800 buses and 65,000 bus commuters on regular weekday mornings, (6-10 a.m.). This bus lane is the busiest in the United States.

Each of the travel lanes in the Lincoln Tunnel's center tube is reversible. In general, both of the lanes, including the exclusive bus lane, serve Manhattan-bound traffic during the weekday morning rush hour, both of the lanes serve New Jersey-bound traffic during the weekday evening rush hour, and one lane is provided in each direction during other time periods. New Jersey-bound traffic normally uses both lanes of the north tube and Manhattan-bound traffic normally uses both lanes of the south tube.

Route 495 is a busy route that carries approximately 74,571 vehicles at its western terminus and approximately 119,432 vehicles by the time it reaches the Lincoln Tunnel. According to the American Highway Users Alliance, Route 495 is considered one of the most congested corridors on the East Coast of the United States; as of 2018, drivers spent a cumulative 3.4 million hours per year sitting in congestion on Route 495.

== History ==
Interstate 495
- Location: Secaucus–Weehawken
- Length: 3.45 mi (5.55 km)
- Existed: 1959–1986

The road was built as an approach to the Lincoln Tunnel, with the first section opening December 22, 1937, when the first (now the center) tube of the tunnel was completed. This section ran only from the tunnel portal south through the toll booths to a plaza with Park Avenue and Hudson County Boulevard East. Marginal Street, providing access from Hudson County Boulevard East west over Park Avenue to 32nd Street and the Bergen Turnpike, was also opened at that time. In 1939, the Port Authority opened the rest of the approach, up the helix and west to Route 3, and it was designated as an eastern extension of Route 3. The final section of today's Route 495 opened on January 15, 1952, with the completion of the New Jersey Turnpike. The turnpike interchange (exit 16) only served Route 3 traffic to and from the south; exit 17 served Route 3 traffic to and from the north.

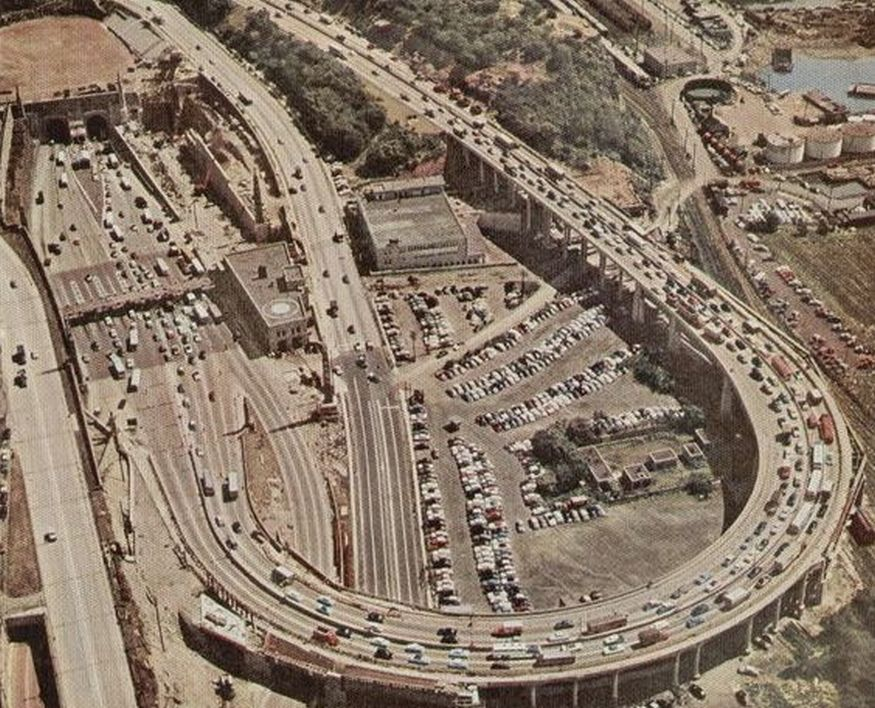
Lincoln Tunnel Helix and toll plaza (circa 1955), with the south tube under construction

With the creation of the Interstate Highway System in 1956, the approach to the Lincoln Tunnel was planned to become an Interstate Highway along with present-day Route 3, which itself was not included in the Interstate Highway System because New Jersey thought it would be too expensive to bring it up to Interstate Highway standards. However, the Lincoln Tunnel approach was included in the Interstate Highway System and in 1959, it was renumbered from Route 3 to I-495 despite the fact it does not meet Interstate Highway standards. Shortly after the road became I-495, the western portion of the road was brought up to Interstate Highway standards with the improvements of the interchanges with the New Jersey Turnpike and Route 3. I-495 was intended to connect with New York's I-495 by way of the Mid-Manhattan Expressway; however, this proposed freeway through Manhattan was canceled in 1971 due to strong opposition to the road running through the heart of Midtown Manhattan. Because New Jersey's I-495 would not be connected to New York's, NJDOT started referring to the route as Route 495 in 1979. The American Association of State Highway and Transportation Officials (AASHTO) approved the decommissioning of I-495 between I-95 and Pleasant Avenue/Park Avenue in Union City in 1980. In 1986, AASHTO approved the decommissioning of the rest of the I-495 designation in New Jersey.

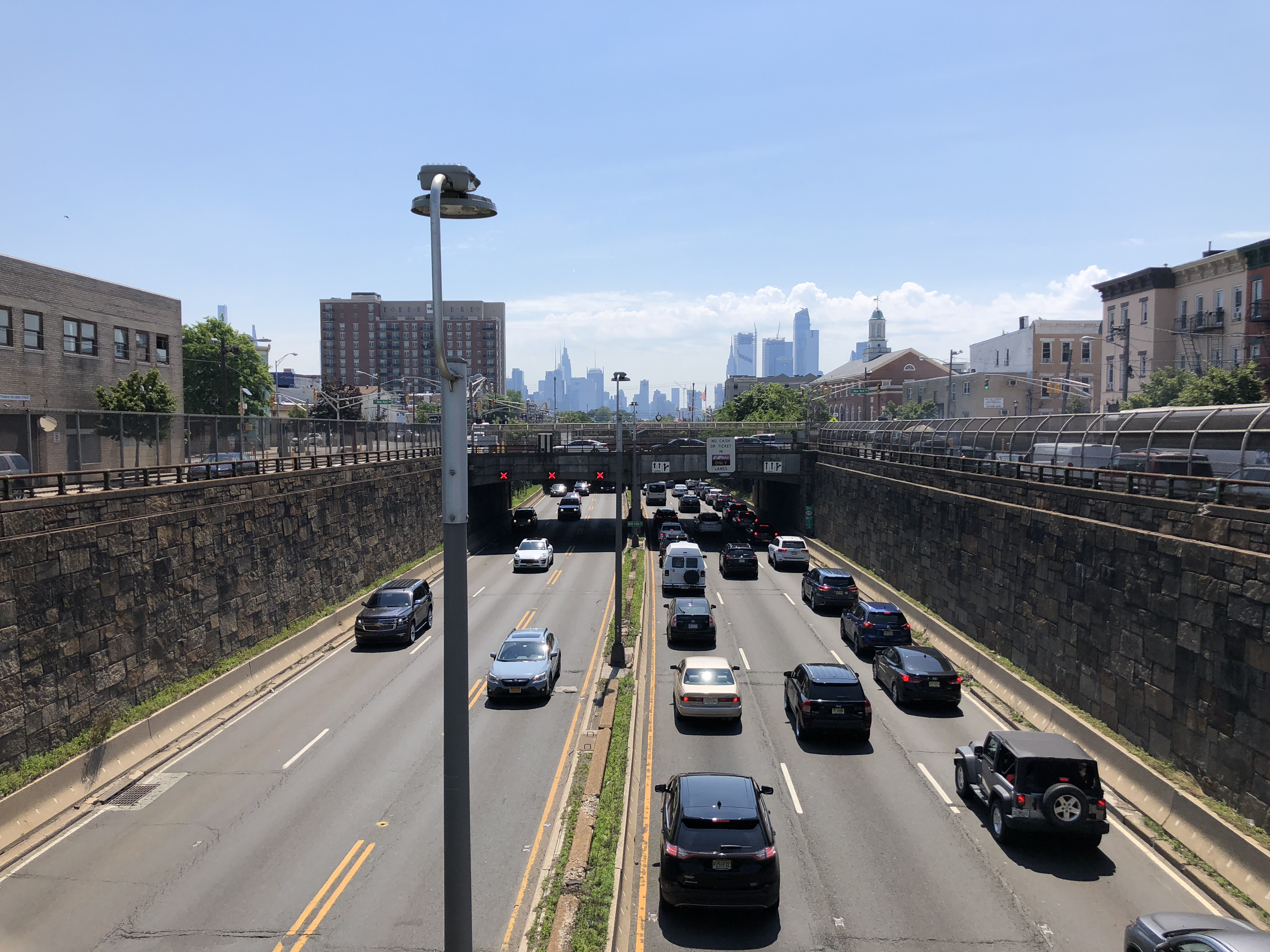
Route 495 eastbound in Union City, with the Manhattan skyline visible in the distance

Starting with the viaduct, which passes over the Conrail rail lines just west of US 1/9, the roadway going east is listed as being eligible for state registry in the New Jersey Register of Historic Places for its engineering, architecture and history. The designations for eligibility were given in segments between 1991 and 2003 and include the Lincoln Tunnel Approach and Helix, as well as the tunnels, toll booths, and ventilation towers.

The Helix has traditionally been known for offering a panoramic view of the Manhattan skyline. While local zoning laws prohibit the construction of high-rise buildings that would obstruct sight-lines from higher points in town, as of June 2013 construction of a new residential building partially blocked the view from the lower portion of the roadway. As of 2015, the Helix is considered by the PANYNJ to have a working life-span of ten years. Alternatives to its replacement include tunnels under the Palisades directly to the Lincoln Tunnel portals.

In June 2018, the New Jersey Department of Transportation announced that it would renovate the North Bergen Viaduct (the section passing over US 1/9 and Conrail) over the course of more than two years. During that time, one travel lane in each direction would be closed, reducing the number of travel lanes in each direction from 4 to 3.

== Exit list ==
The entire route is in Hudson County. All exits are unnumbered.

Location	mi	km	Destinations	Notes
Secaucus	0.00	0.00	I-95 Toll south / N.J. Turnpike south – Newark	Western terminus; exit 16E on I-95 / Turnpike
North Bergen	0.19	0.31	I-95 north (N.J. Turnpike) to I-80 west / US 46 – George Washington Bridge	Westbound exit and eastbound entrance; exit 17 on I-95 / Turnpike; last westbound exit before toll
North Bergen	0.78	1.26	US 1-9 north	Eastbound exit and westbound entrance; access via Route 3 east
North Bergen	0.78	1.26	Route 3 west to G.S. Parkway – Secaucus, Sports Complex	Westbound exit and eastbound entrance
North Bergen	0.90	1.45	US 1-9 – Ridgefield, Jersey City	Westbound exit and eastbound entrance
Union City	1.23	1.98	Kennedy Boulevard (CR 501)	Roundabout above Route 495 and below Kennedy Boulevard
Weehawken	1.81	2.91	Park Avenue – Union City, Weehawken, Hoboken	No eastbound entrance; last eastbound exit before toll; access to ferries to New York City
Weehawken	2.23	3.59	Boulevard East – Weehawken	Westbound exit only
Weehawken	2.50	4.02	Weehawken, Hoboken	Westbound exit and eastbound entrance; access via CR 675
Hudson River	3.45	5.55	Lincoln Tunnel (eastbound toll in Manhattan)	
Hudson River	3.45	5.55	NY 495 east – New York City	Continuation into New York at the river's center; former I-495
1.000 mi = 1.609 km; 1.000 km = 0.621 mi: Incomplete access; Tolled

== See also ==
- List of bridges, tunnels, and cuts in Hudson County, New Jersey
- Interstate 495 (New York)
