= West Midtown Ferry Terminal =

Intermodal terminal in Manhattan, New York

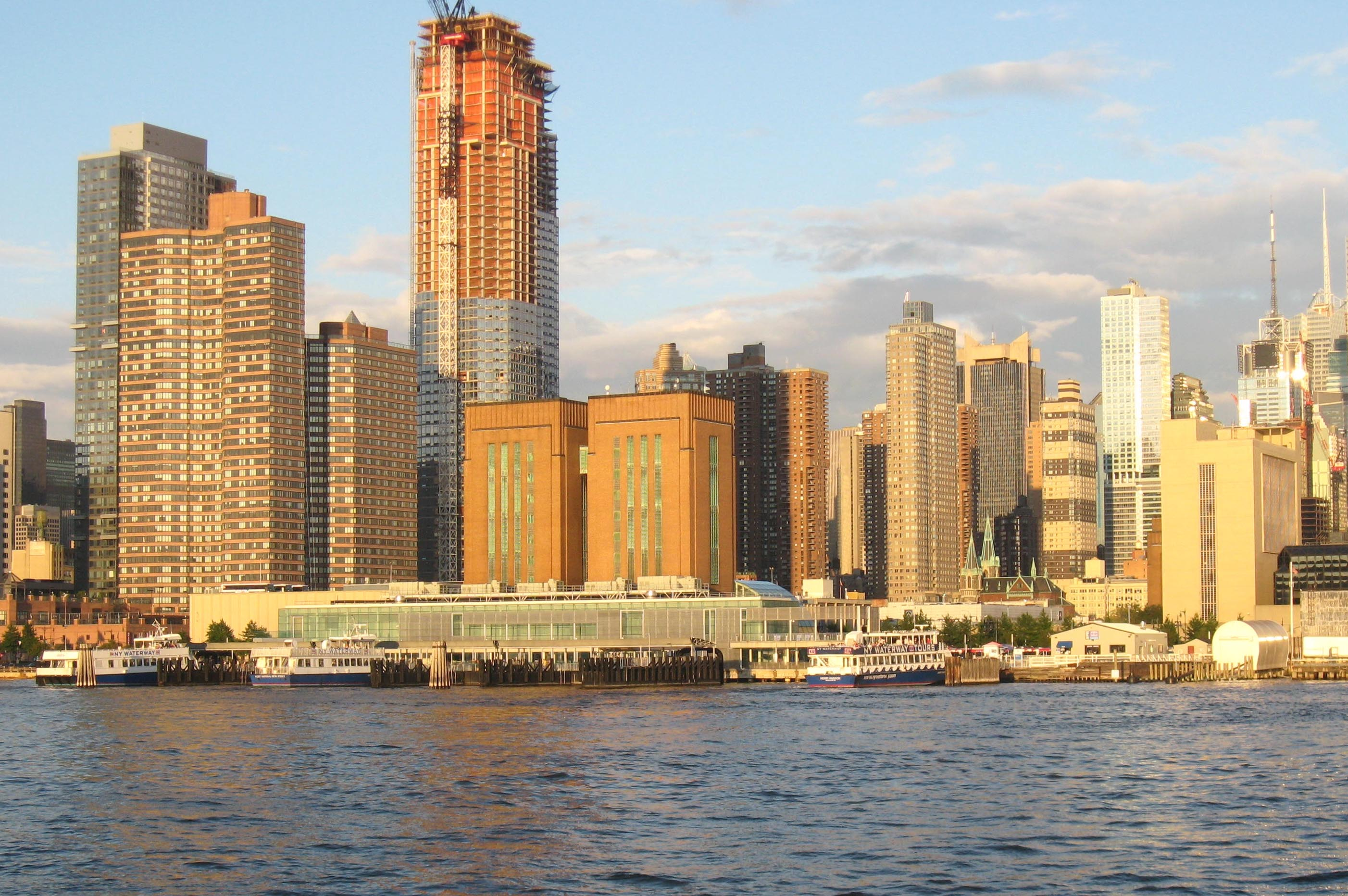

General information
- Location: Pier 79, 459 12th Avenue; Manhattan, New York; United States
- Coordinates: 40°45′37.57″N 74°0′12.57″W
- System: Ferry terminal
- Owner: City of New York
- Operator: NY Waterway
- Lines: NY Waterway; NYC Ferry
- Connections: New York City Bus: M12, M42, M50; NY Waterway shuttle buses

Construction
- Accessible: Disabled access
- Architect: William Nicholas Boudova & Associates

History
- Opened: 3 December 1986
- Rebuilt: 2005

Passengers
- 2025: 2,835,498 per year

Services
Preceding station	NYC Ferry	Following station
Battery Park City toward Pier 11/Wall Street	St. George	Terminus

Other services
NY Waterway services to New Jersey
NY Waterway IKEA shuttle
Location

The West Midtown Ferry Terminal is a passenger bus and ferry terminal serving ferries along the Hudson River in New York City and northeastern New Jersey. It is located at Pier 79 in Hudson River Park adjacent to the West Side Highway at West 39th Street in Midtown Manhattan. The facility first opened on December 3, 1986, with the start of NY Waterway commuter ferry service.

Built largely with public funds, the West Midtown terminal is owned by the city and leased to NY Waterway, which operates ferries to Jersey City, Hoboken, Weehawken, Edgewater, South Amboy, and Belford in New Jersey. The ferry service refers to the terminal as Midtown / West 39th Street in scheduling. As a public terminal, the facility is open to any ferry company. NYC Ferry also uses the terminal for its St. George route, referring to it as West Midtown/W 39th St/Pier 79.

The terminal is located on a narrow strip of land west of Hudson River Park and the West Side Highway (also known as Twelfth Avenue). Its construction required the incorporation of the ventilation towers of the Lincoln Tunnel built in the 1930s. Clad in glass, it contains six ferry slips as well as a passenger ticketing area and waiting room.

== History ==
The Weehawken was the last ferry to the West Shore Railroad's Weehawken Terminal on March 25, 1959, at 1:10 am., ending a century of continuous service from 42nd Street. In 1981 Arthur Edward Imperatore, Sr., trucking magnate, purchased a 2.5-mile (4.0 km) length of the Weehawken waterfront from the bankrupt Penn Central for $7.5 million and in 1986 established New York Waterway, with a route across the river that roughly paralleled the older one. Initially, the ferry slip at Pier 78 was a makeshift affair with limited, yet increasing ridership.

After the September 11, 2001 attacks on the World Trade Center destroyed the PATH terminal located there cross-Hudson passenger capacity was greatly reduced, and ferry service was expanded to compensate. NY Waterway borrowed heavily to acquire new vessels to add new routes and add more runs to schedules. City and state agencies contracted the construction of new ferry terminals to be leased to private operators, of which the West Midtown is one. With the restoration of rapid transit service, ridership numbers dropped significantly. The Port Authority of New York and New Jersey brokered a deal to avoid bankruptcy and disruption of service.

In 2005, the facility was overhauled to accommodate an increasing demand for ferry service in the Port of New York and New Jersey and to provide ferry slips for short haul crossings, water taxis, and high-speed long-distance service. The 2005 renovation was built by the New York City Economic Development Corporation.

== Services ==
=== Ferry ===
NY Waterway commuter ferries connect to several New Jersey terminals, reaching Lincoln Harbor, Weehawken Port Imperial, Belford, and Hoboken 14th Street 7 days a week. Hoboken Terminal, Paulus Hook Ferry Terminal, Edgewater Landing, and South Amboy are also served weekday peak hours.

Service on the St. George route of the NYC Ferry system began in August 2021. Ferries make intermediate stops at Battery Park City Ferry Terminal, at St. George Terminal, and in Brooklyn before terminating at Pier 11/Wall Street.

==== Routes ====
Destination	Company	Intermediate Stops	Operational Hours	Slip
Pier 11/Wall Street	NYC Ferry	Battery Park City, Manhattan; St. George Terminal, Staten Island; Bay Ridge, Brooklyn; Atlantic Avenue, Brooklyn	7 days a week	2
Port Imperial	NY Waterway	None	7 days a week	6
Lincoln Harbor	NY Waterway	Hoboken 14th Street	7 days a week	5
Hoboken 14th Street	NY Waterway	Lincoln Harbor	7 days a week	5
Belford	NY Waterway	Paulus Hook (some trips); Battery Park City; Pier 11/Wall Street	7 days a week	
Paulus Hook	NY Waterway	Hoboken Terminal	Weekday peak hours	4
Hoboken Terminal	NY Waterway	Paulus Hook	Weekday peak hours	4
South Amboy	NY Waterway	Battery Park City; Pier 11/Wall Street	Weekday peak hours	4
Edgewater	NY Waterway	Port Imperial	Weekday peak hours	3
IKEA Red Hook	NY Waterway	Pier 11/Wall Street	Weekends	3

=== Bus ===
NY Waterway maintains a fleet of buses which provide free connecting service to the ferry that run on peak and off peak routes in Manhattan below 59th Street. New York City transit buses M42 and M50 stop in the vicinity of the terminal at 42nd Street.

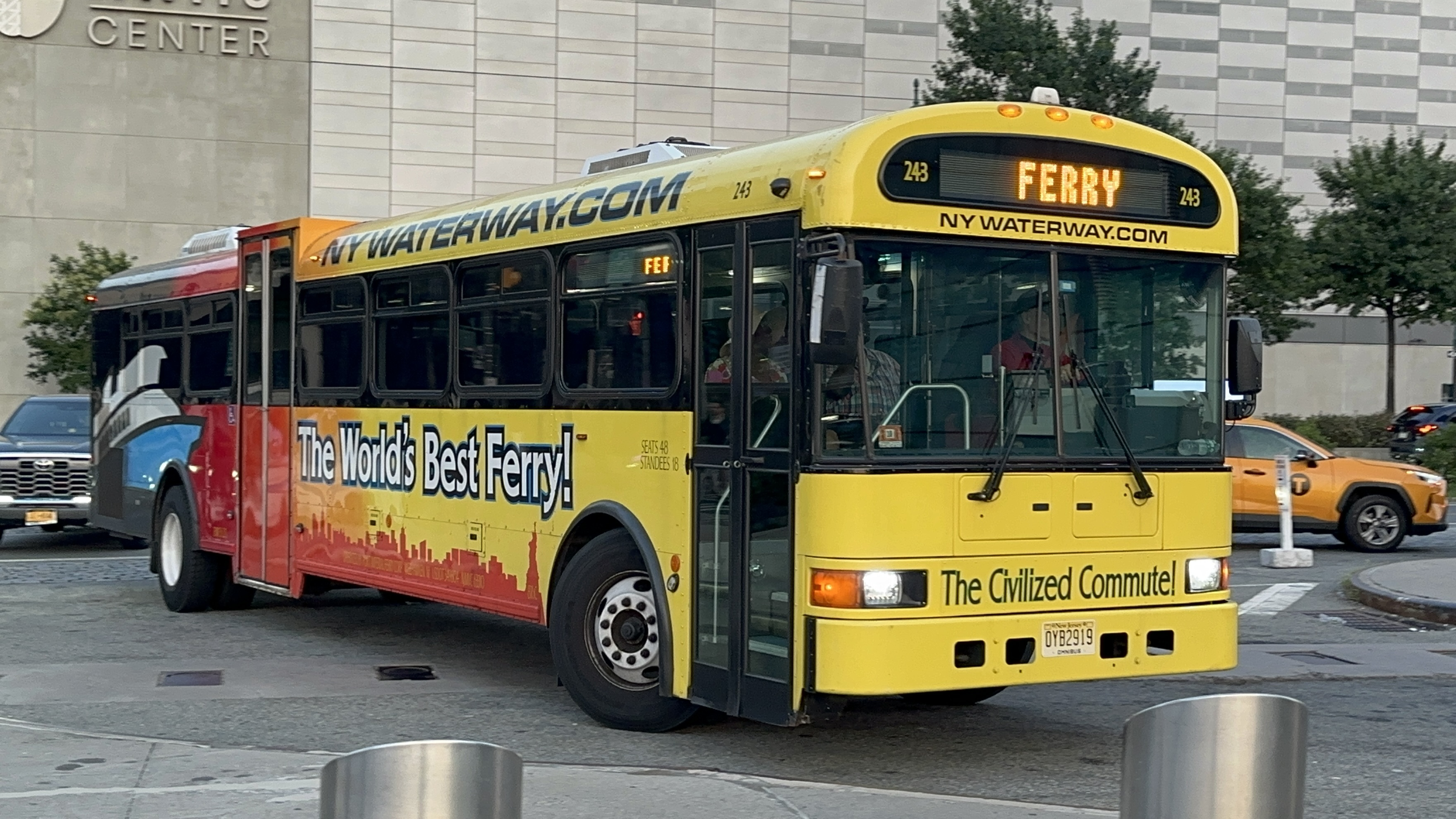
NY Waterway 243 pulling in to the Manhattan terminal.

=== Slips ===
The terminal has seven slips, of which six are usually used:

- Slip 1: Big City Tourism
- Slip 2: NYC Ferry
- Slip 3: NY Waterway Edgewater, IKEA Shuttle
- Slip 4: NY Waterway Paulus Hook/Hoboken South, South Amboy
- Slip 5: NY Waterway Lincoln Harbor/Hoboken North
- Slip 6: NY Waterway Port Imperial
- Slip 7: Unused

== Gallery ==
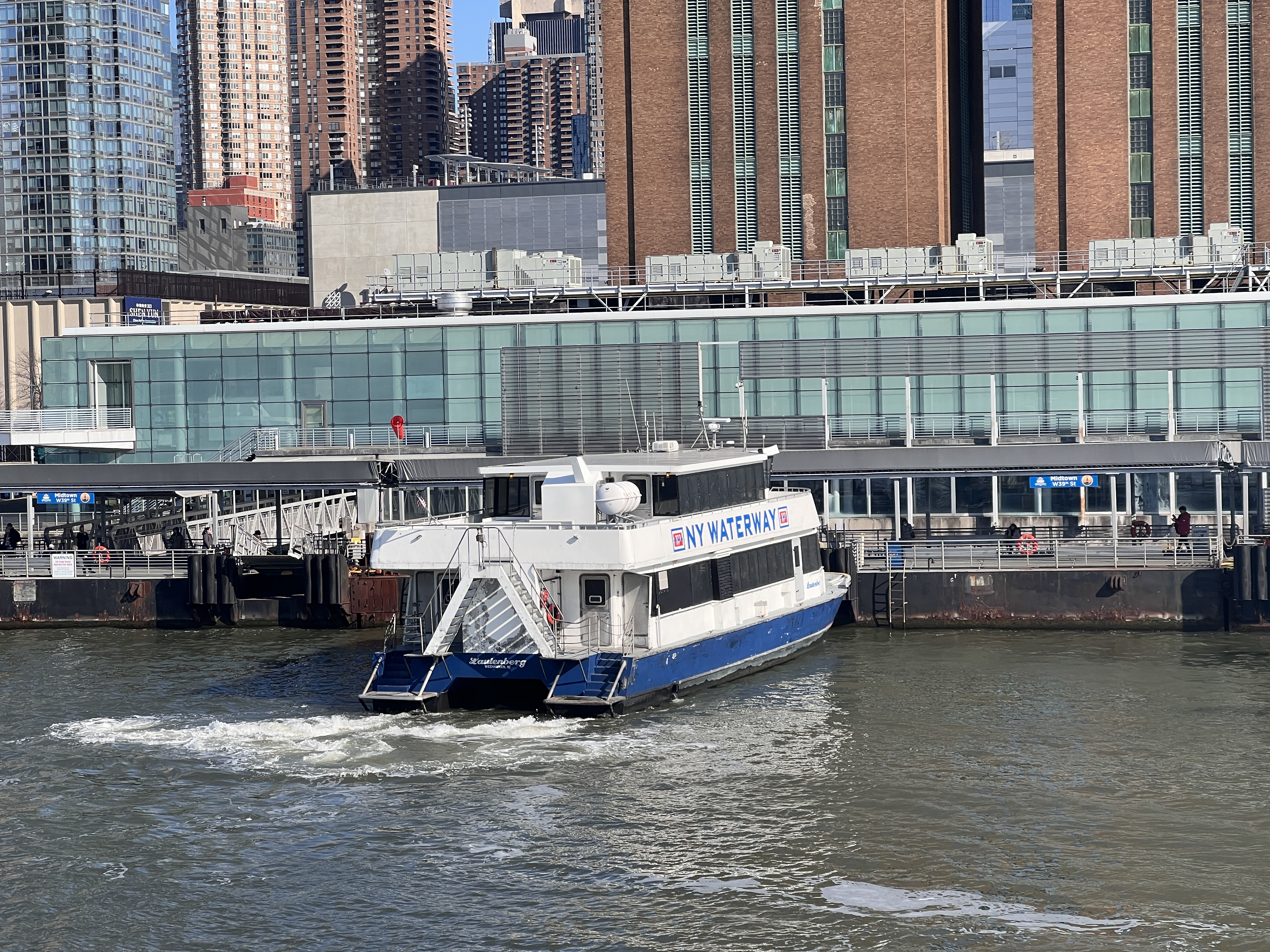
A ferry docked at the terminal

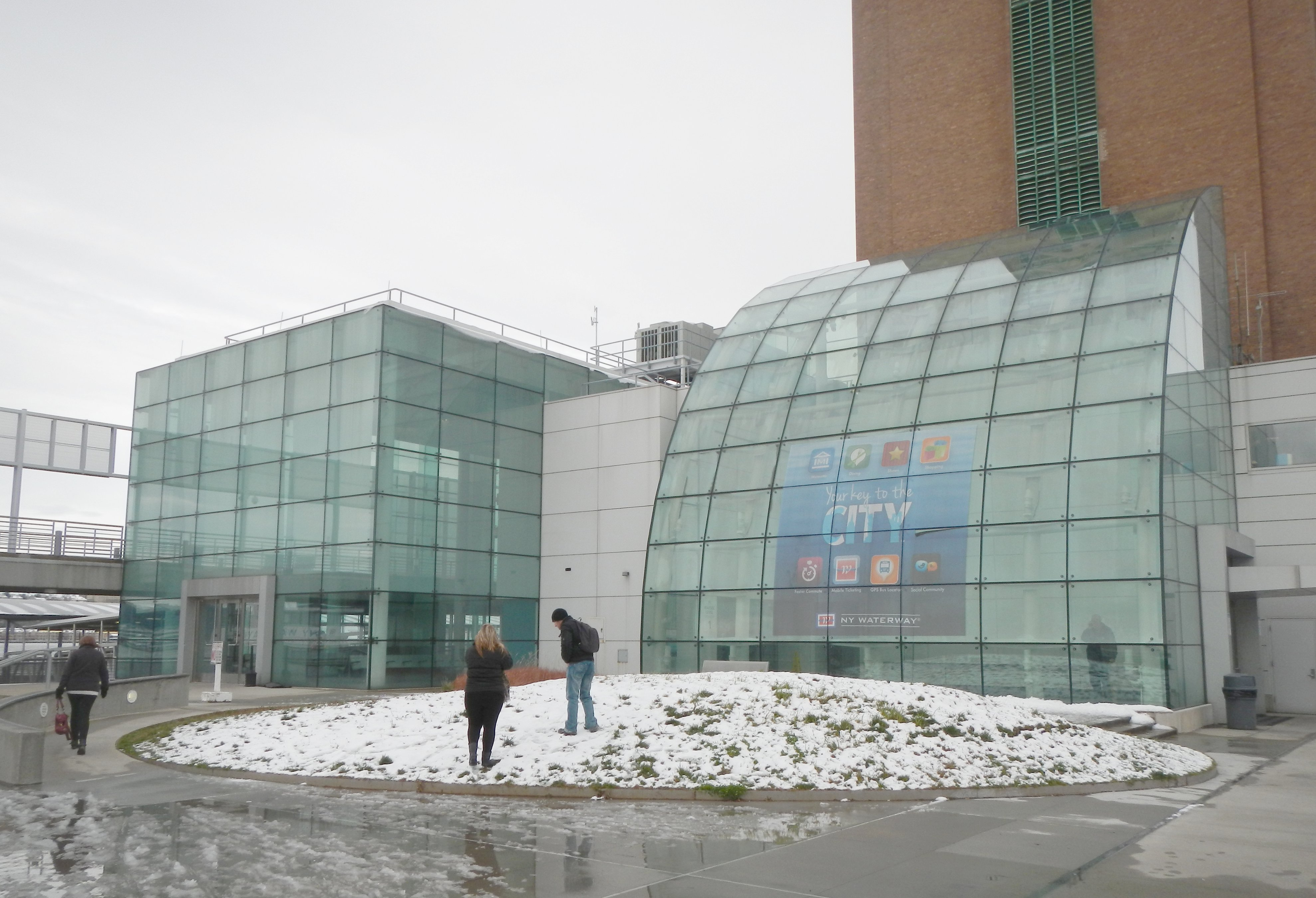
The terminal's exterior

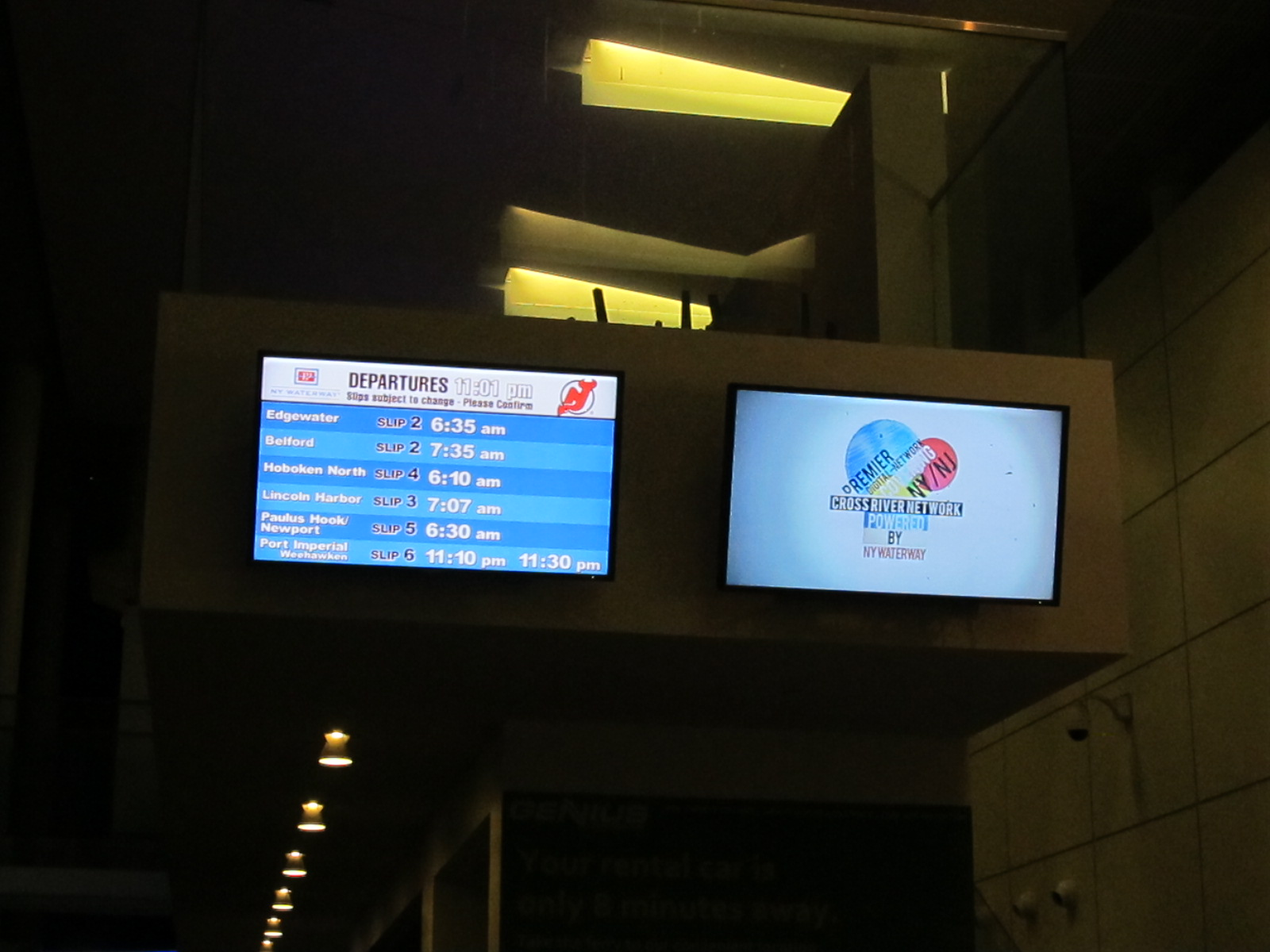
The departure boards inside the terminal

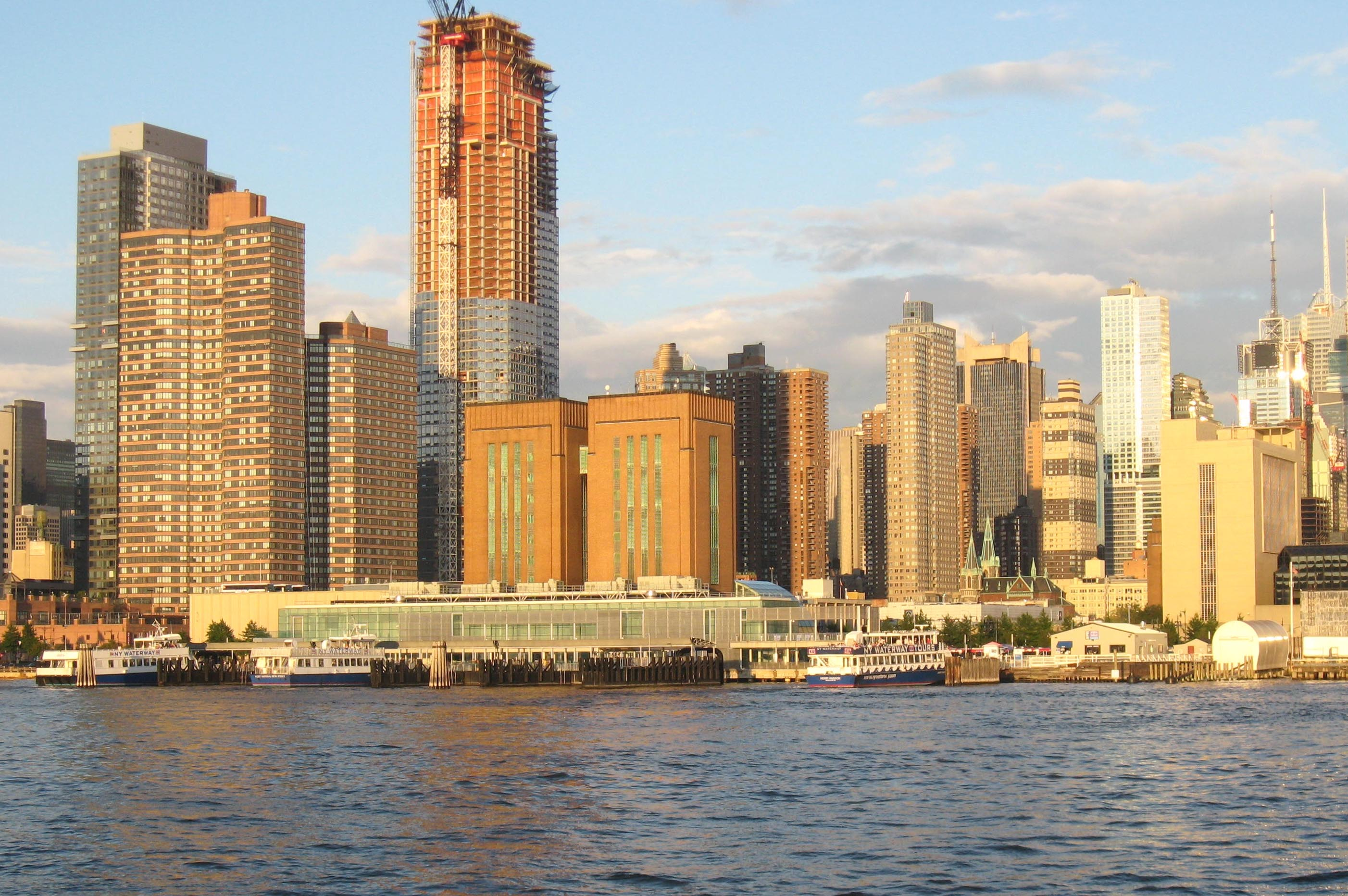
The terminal from the water

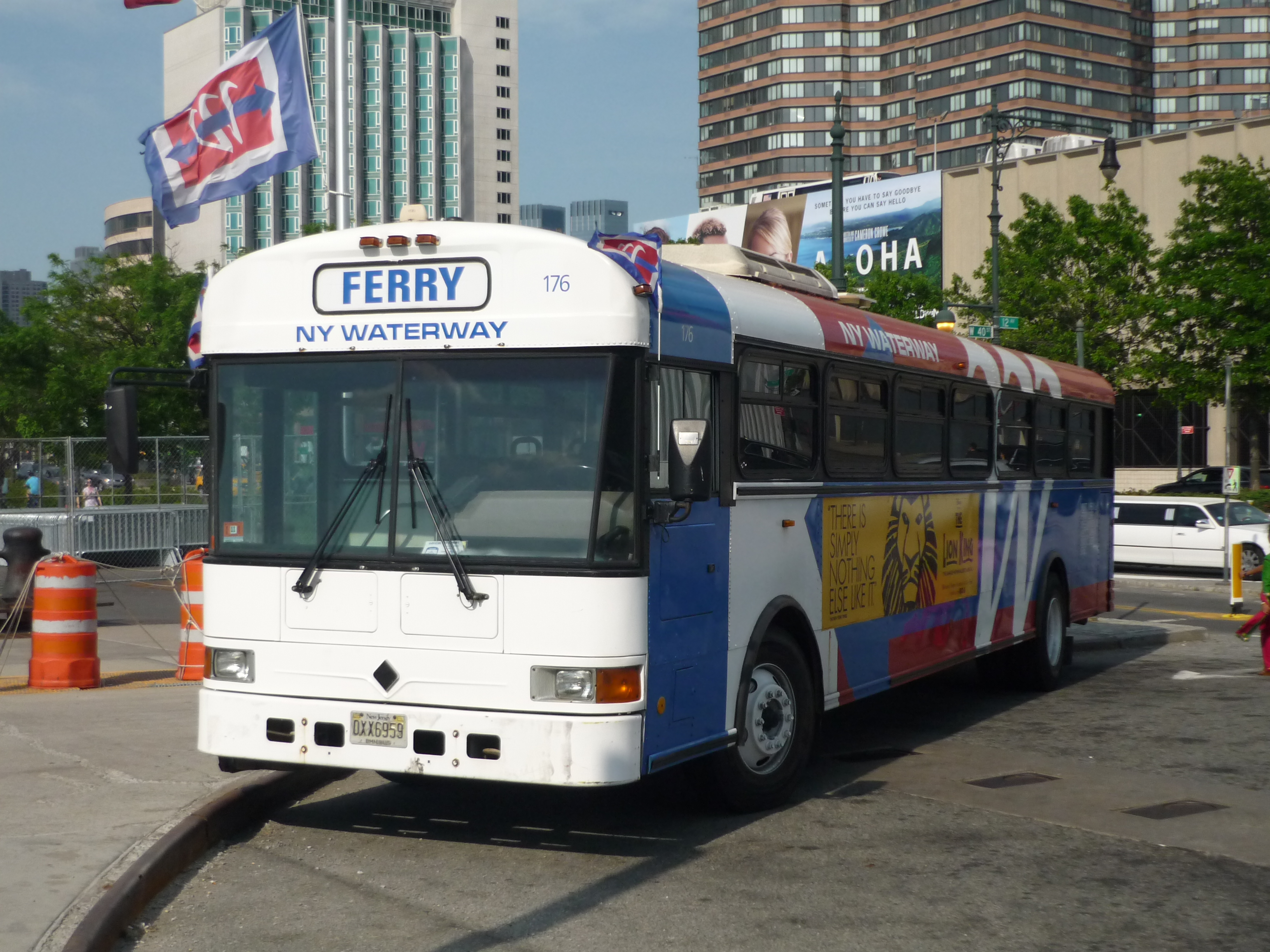
A shuttle bus pulling into the terminal

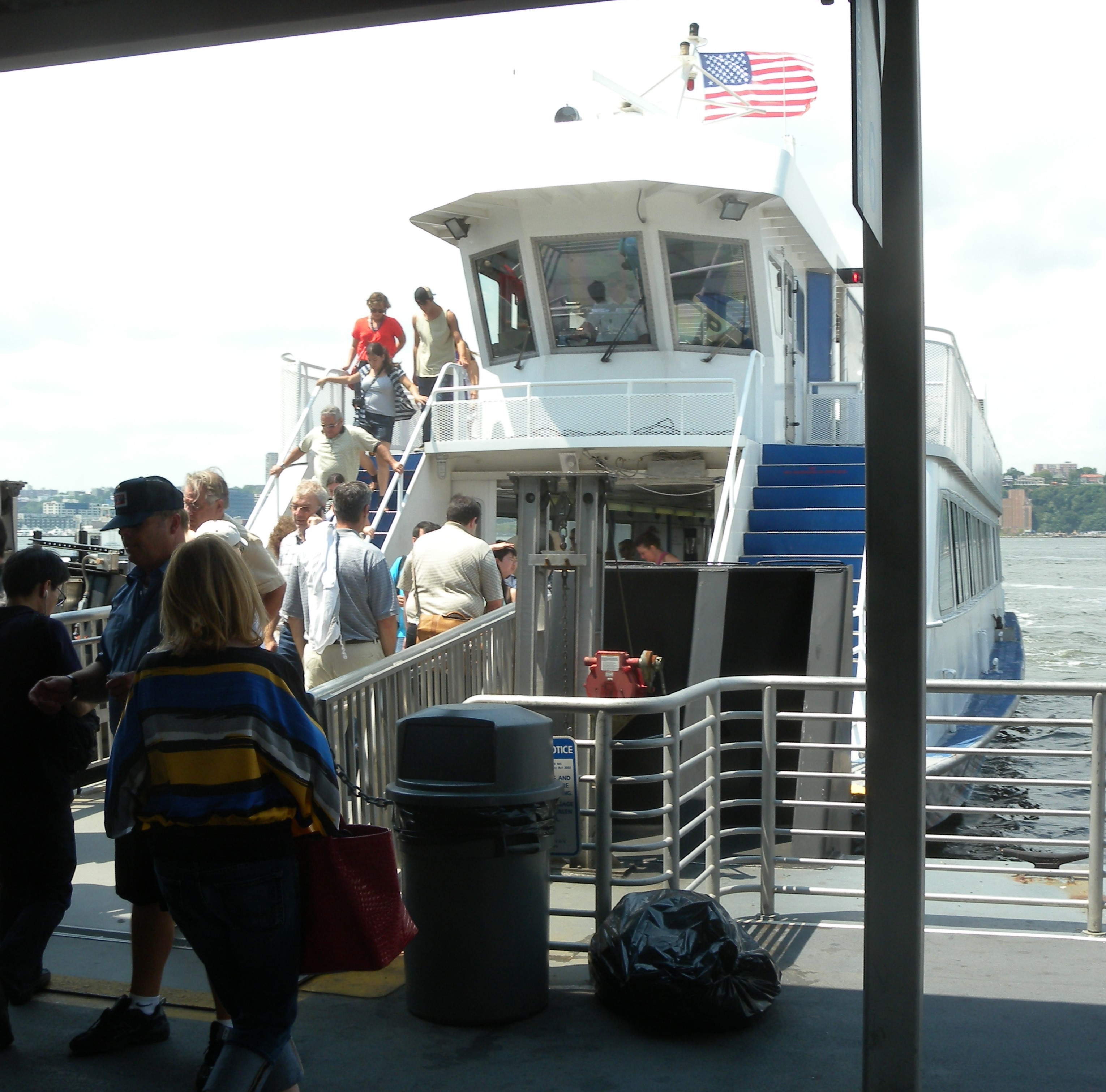
A boat boarding at the terminal

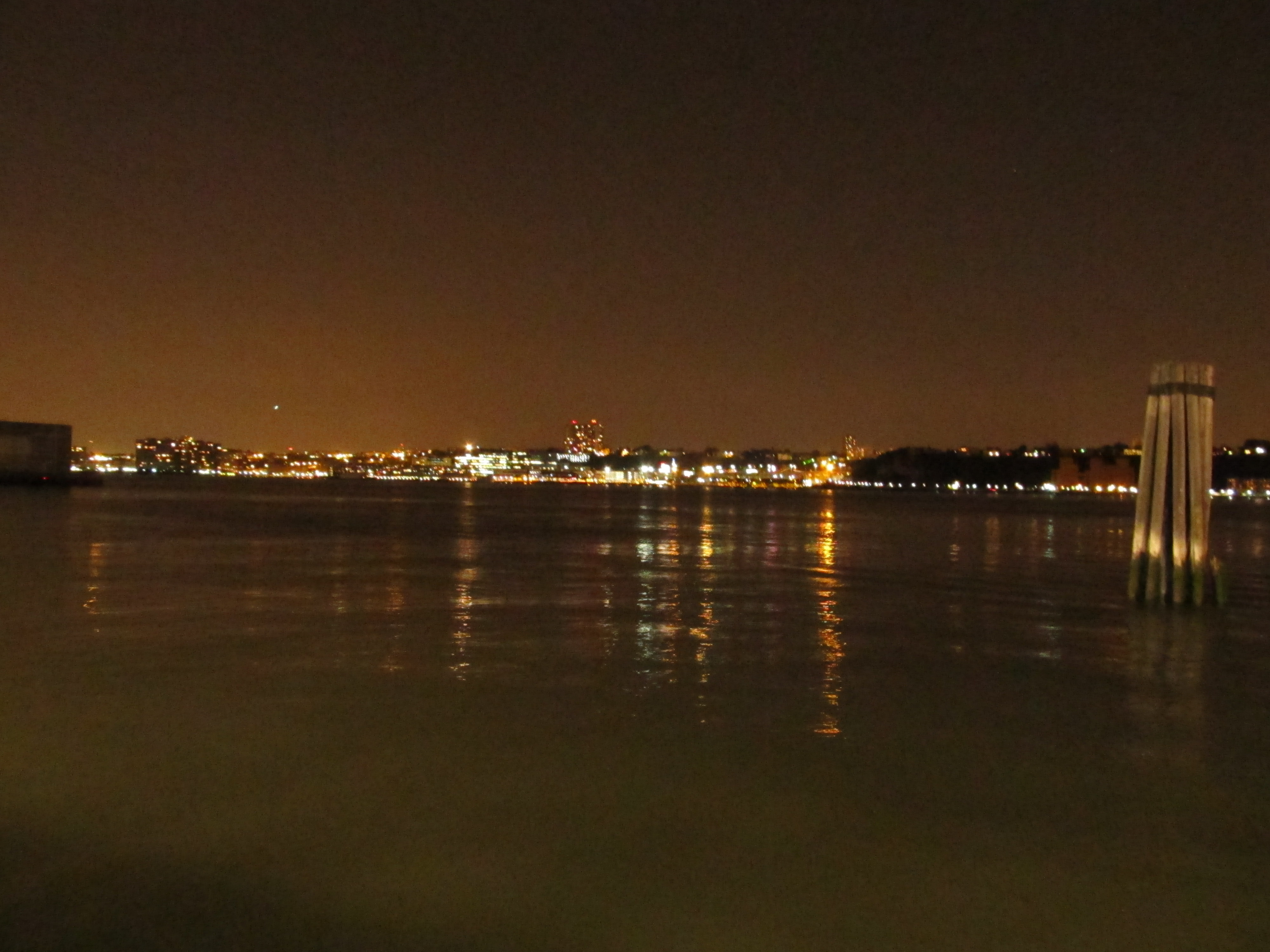
A view of the river from the terminal

== See also ==
- NY Waterway
- Battery Park City Ferry Terminal
- Pier 11/Wall Street
