= Coytesville Line =

Former streetcar line in New Jersey, US

Overview
- Status: Abandoned
- Owner: Public Service Railway Bergen Division, originally North Hudson County Railway
- Locale: Bergen County, New Jersey
- Termini: Coytesville; Edgewater Ferry Terminal Weehawken Terminal
- Stations: unknown

Service
- Type: Streetcar
- System: Public Service Railway Bergen Division, originally North Hudson County Railway
- Services: 2
- Route number: 9

History
- Opened: Before 1895
- Closed: June 1, 1933

Technical
- Character: Surface
- Track gauge: 4 ft 8 1/2 in (1,435 mm) standard gauge
- Electrification: Yes

The Route 9 - Coytesville was a former streetcar line in Bergen County, New Jersey. Operated by the Palisades Railroad, a subsidiary of the North Hudson County Railway, the line ran from Coytesville in the north to Palisades Junction on the border of Fort Lee and Cliffside Park, and then split into two branches, one running to Edgewater and its ferry terminal, and one running to Weehawken Terminal. It opened sometime before 1895 and closed on June 1, 1933, although tracks remained until 1937.

== Route ==
The line started out in the unincorporated community of Coytesville, now in the northern section of Fort Lee. It ran south from there, passing through what is now the George Washington Bridge Plaza, and crossing Fort Lee's Main Street. It then entered a private right-of-way, which it followed through the southern section of Fort Lee, and to Palisades Junction. It intersected with routes 1 - Hudson River and 5 - Englewood here, coming from Paterson and Tenafly, respectively. Route 1 - Hudson River is now the 751 and 770 bus routes, and route 5 - Englewood is now the 751 and 166 bus routes. There was a power substation here, which still stands as of November 2022.

Some trains continued to the Edgewater Ferry Terminal via a hairpin curve down the Palisades here, while others continued south through Cliffside Park and through what is now the North Hudson County Park. Streetcars then traveled along Broadway, turning east on 48th street (then called 4th street) where they met the Bergenline Avenue and Weehawken Car lines before going down the Palisades on a private right-of-way similar to the route of Pershing Road in Weehawken, which they used to access Weehawken Terminal, also called the West Shore Terminal.

== Service ==
A schedule from 1895 shows 17 round trips a day, mostly oriented towards commuter hours.

== Remnants ==
North of Fort Lee, not many remnants remain, as the George Washington Bridge Plaza was built on top of the ROW. However, in southern Fort Lee, the right-of-way remains intact, as a walking and biking path between Tom Hunter Rd and Riverdale Dr, and as the median of Abbott Blvd south of Riverdale Dr. The power substation at the former Palisades Junction remains intact, on the west side of Abbott Blvd at Warren Av, right on the Fort Lee-Cliffside Park borough line. The right-of-way is traceable down a street called Railroad Avenue until Gorge Road, which was crossed by a bridge, continuing through Borough Hall and Commercial Avenue, just west of Palisade Avenue as far as the Hudson County line. In addition to these remnants, Pershing Road in Weehawken, formerly used by the Coytesville Line and other streetcars, still exists, and is now a road for cars.

== Replacement ==
Route 9 - Coytesville closed in 1933, however unlike the other Bergen Division lines, route 9 - Coytesville was never replaced directly with bus service. However, the 156 bus route roughly follows the route north of North Bergen, and the 128, 165, 166, 168, 23, 84P and 89 buses roughly follow it south of North Bergen. In addition, some rush hour trips of the 23 continue down Pershing Road to Port Imperial, the successor to Weehawken Terminal.
