= Port Imperial =

Intermodal transit hub and residential community in New Jersey, USA

Port Imperial Ferry
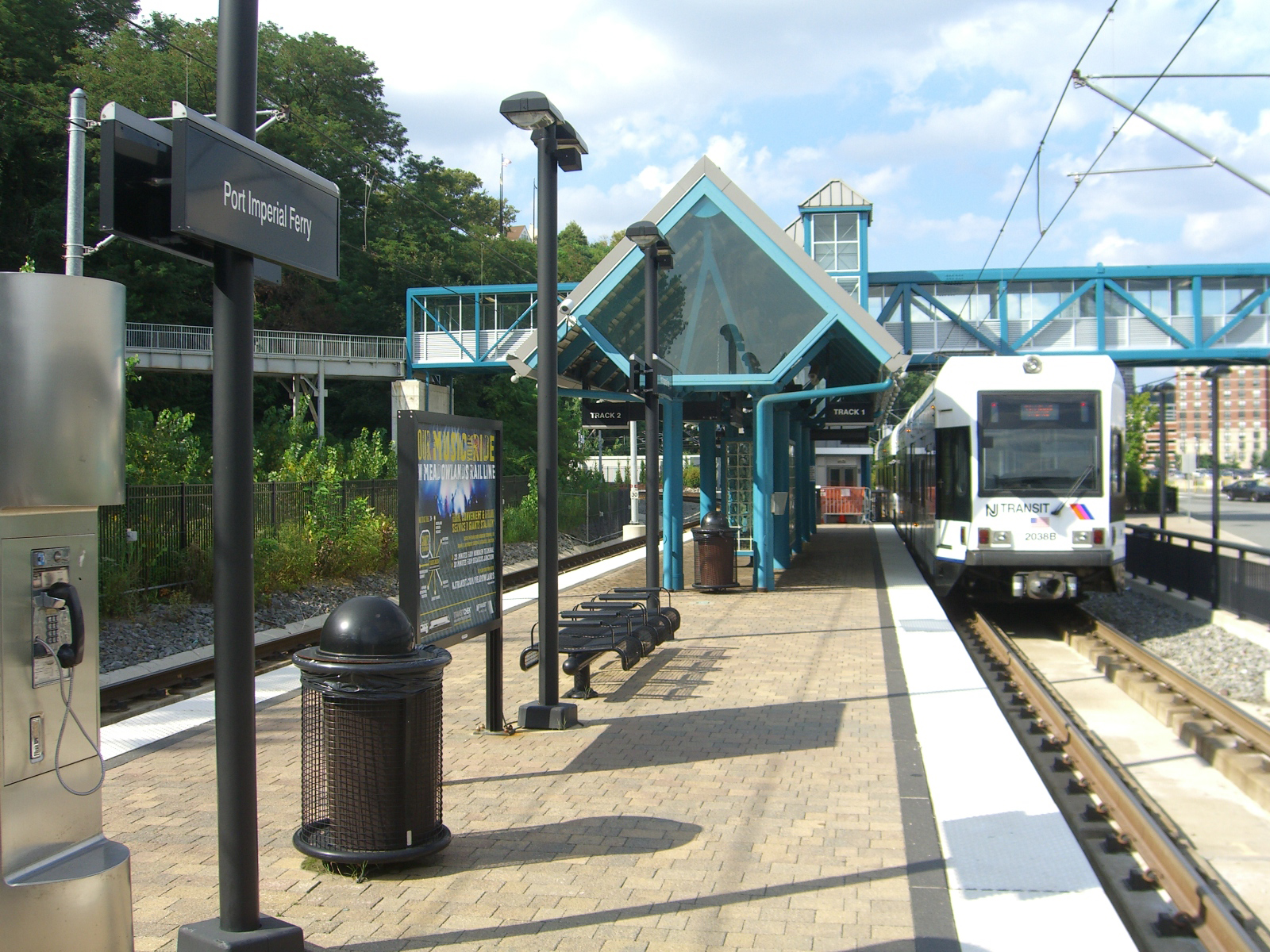
- The light rail platform with the pedestrian bridge connecting to the ferry terminal in the background

General information
- Location: 4800 Avenue at Port Imperial (ferry); Port Imperial Boulevard (rail); Weehawken, New Jersey
- Coordinates: 40°46′33″N 74°00′46″W
- Owner: New Jersey Transit
- Platforms: 1 island platform
- Tracks: 2
- Connections: NJ Transit Bus: 23, 156, 158, 159; NY Waterway

Construction
- Cycle facilities: Yes
- Accessible: Yes

Other information
- Station code: 30825 (NJ Transit)
- Fare zone: 1 (NJ Transit)

History
- Opened: October 29, 2005 (rail); May 22, 2006 (ferry)

Passengers
- 2025: 1,275 (average weekday)
- Rank: 20 of 24

Services
Preceding station	NJ Transit	Following station
Lincoln Harbor toward West Side Avenue	West Side–Tonnelle	Bergenline Avenue toward Tonnelle Avenue
Lincoln Harbor toward Hoboken	Hoboken–Tonnelle	Bergenline Avenue toward Tonnelle Avenue
Location

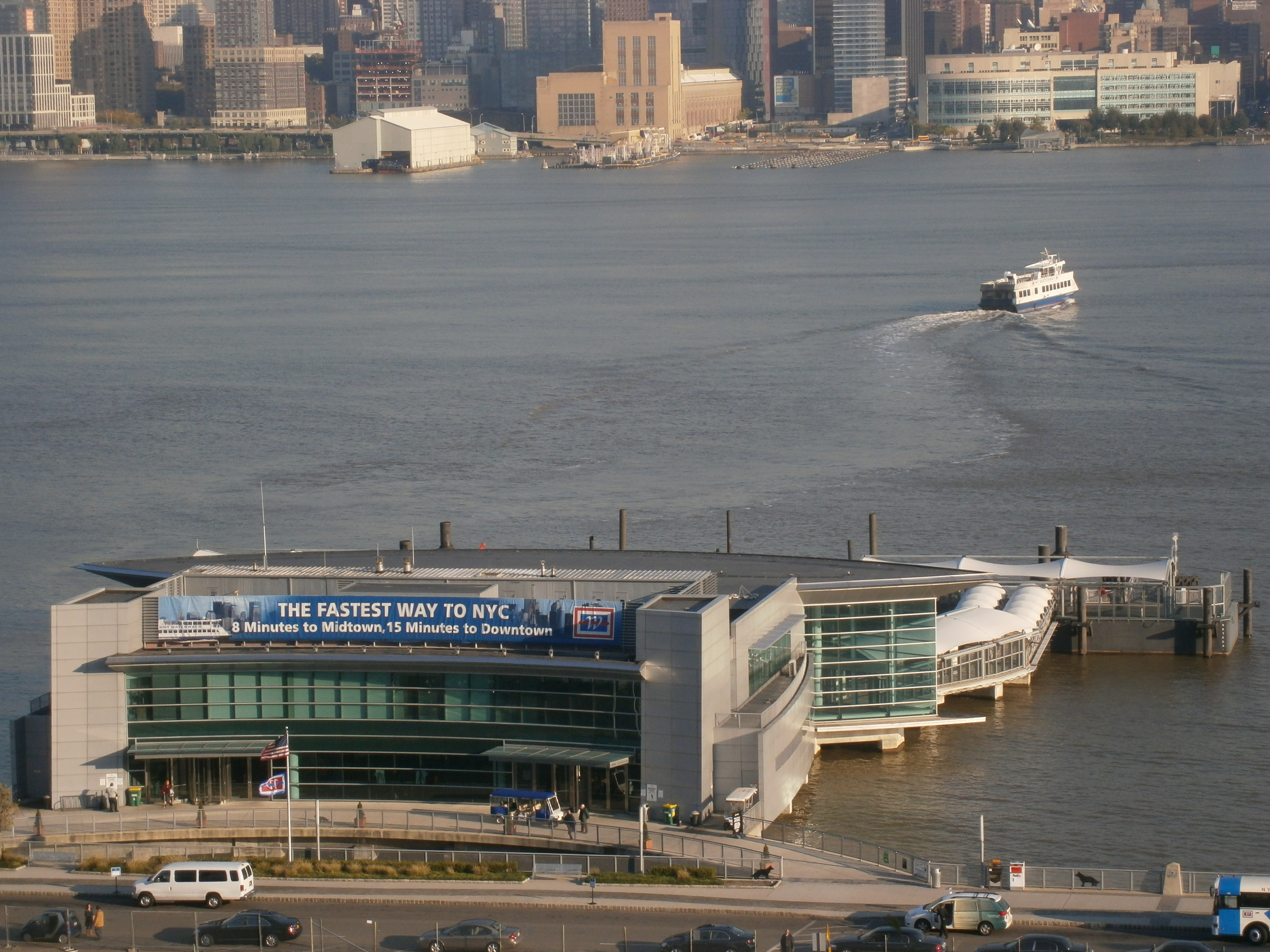
Ferry terminal as seen from the Palisades

Port Imperial is a residential area centered around an intermodal transit hub on the Hudson Waterfront in Weehawken and West New York in New Jersey. The district is served by New York Waterway ferries and buses, Hudson–Bergen Light Rail, and NJT buses that lie at the foot of Pershing Road, a thoroughfare traveling along the face of the Hudson Palisades. The Hudson River Waterfront Walkway runs along the shoreline and is abutted by recently constructed residential neighborhoods, Lincoln Harbor to the south and Bulls Ferry to the north.

== History ==
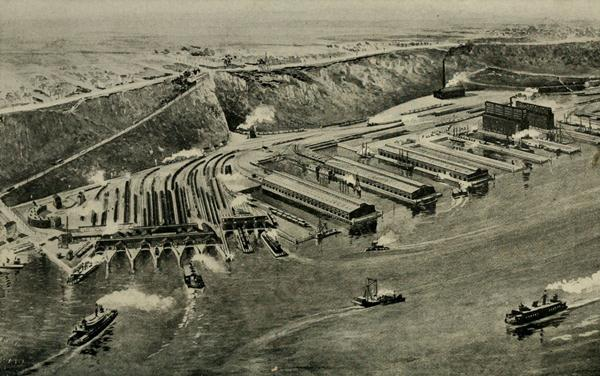
Weehawken Terminal and Pershing Road circa 1906

=== Early ferries and railroads ===
The North Hudson waterfront is located north of Weehawken Cove on a long narrow strip of land between the Hudson River and Hudson Palisades. On April 18, 1670 the government of the Province of New Jersey confirmed a grant to Maryn Adriaensen for a parcel of land called Wiehacken in the jurisdiction of Bergen on Hobooken Creek, 50 morgen Dutch measure originally given on May 11, 1647. Sporadic ferry service began and in 1700 a royal patent was given by Richard Coote, 1st Earl of Bellomont which led to the naming of Weehawken Street at the landing across the river in today's West Village. Later called Slough's Meadow, the waterfront has in the last centuries been transformed from a tidal marsh to an extensive rail and shipping port and, since the 1980s, redeveloped for commercial, residential, recreational, and transportation uses. Many duels, including the nation's most famous between Alexander Hamilton and Aaron Burr in 1804, took place on a site later obliterated by rail infrastructure of the West Shore Railroad (also used by the New York, Ontario and Western and the Erie Railroad).

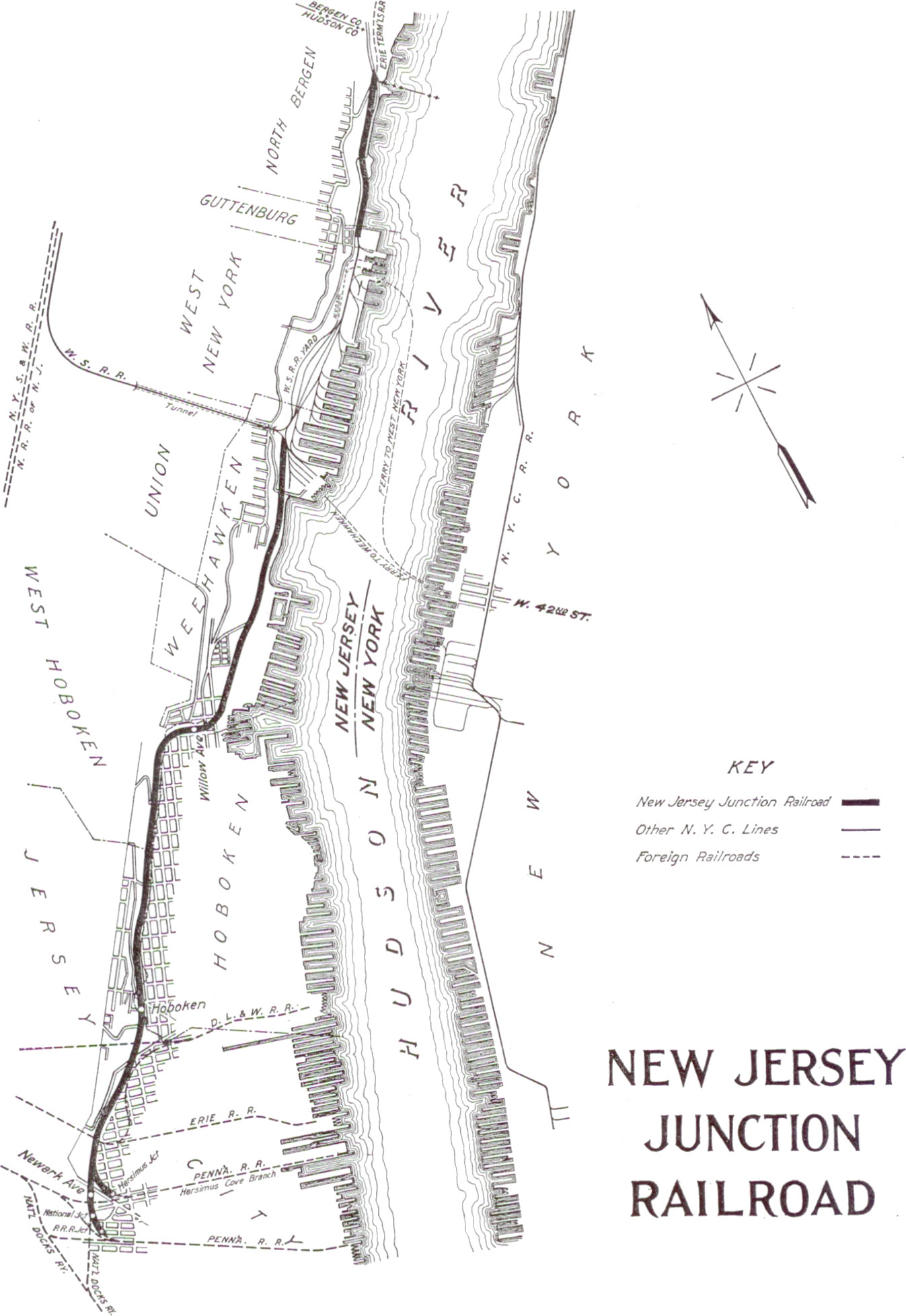
Extensive yards lined the shore and connected to tunnel under the Palisades

The turn of the 20th century saw the growth of the railyards, carfloats, ferry slips, and passenger station of Weehawken Terminal. The main ferry ran to 42nd Street and for short time was a component of the transcontinental Lincoln Highway. The highway and the trolleys of North Hudson County Railway and later the Public Service Railway ascended Pershing Road. The Weehawken was the last ferry to the West Shore Terminal on March 25, 1959, at 1:10 am. and train service was discontinued. The right of way (originally part of the NYC's New Jersey Junction Railroad) was later used by the Penn Central River Division and the Conrail River Line before being abandoned. The United Fruit Company once maintained the largest banana warehouse in the United States adjacent to its berths. As with much of the traditional harbor of the Port of New York and New Jersey, the infrastructure became obsolete as passenger and freight transport patterns changed.

=== Post-industrial era ===
The restoration of rail and ferry services is of a much smaller scale. In 1981 Arthur Edward Imperatore, Sr., trucking magnate, purchased a 2.5 miles (4.0 km) length of the Weehawken Yard from the bankrupt Penn Central for $7.5 million, his surname an inspiration for Port Imperial. New York Waterway was established in 1986. Service was originally provided from a converted ferry moored at the shore next to the marina south of the current terminal. New Jersey Transit contracted the extensive renovation and waterproofing of the Weehawken Tunnel under Bergen Hill which had been built in 1881. The new ferry terminal, built and owned by New Jersey Transit and leased by NY Waterway, opened in May 2006. The HBLR station opened for weekend service in November 2005 and full-time service on October 29, 2006. The construction and maintenance of stairways from atop the cliffs at Boulevard East to the station and the bridge from the station to the ferry slips have been a source of contention and controversy. The area, still under development, is considered to be too oriented to automobiles, rather than pedestrians. While there has been some integration in the wider public transportation system, some transportation is geared within the development site, including parking lots.

In 2009, New York Waterway was instrumental in the rescue of passengers on US Airways Flight 1549, which made an emergency landing on the Hudson River near Port Imperial. The Hudson Riverfront 9/11 Memorial to the September 11 attacks was unveiled on the event's 10th anniversary.

=== Waterfront Community ===
The area surrounding the ferry port has expanded to become a residential, commercial, and recreational neighborhood that spans the neighboring towns of West New York, and Guttenberg. In June 2011, ground was broken on 850-space garage and retail space building, across from the ferry terminal. In October 2011, the hub was announced as the site of the Port Imperial Street Circuit, a motorsport venue hosting the Grand Prix of America, a round of the Formula One World Championship. The start-finish line and pit facilities for the event were supposed to be directly opposite the ferry terminal, and the area was to be further redeveloped for the race, however the event never materialized. In June 2013, a long-awaited bridge connecting the ferry terminal and light rail station was opened. In recent years, there have been many residential buildings built up in the area centered on luxury high rises.

== Services ==
=== Ferry ===
NY Waterway ferries operate to West Midtown Ferry Terminal 7 days a week, Battery Park City Ferry Terminal/Brookfield Pace during weekday rush hours, and Pier 11/Wall Street weekday rush hours and weekends. At the West Midtown terminal, NY Waterway offers free connecting shuttle buses to further serve Midtown Manhattan. NY Waterway maintains a ferry maintenance refueling facility south of the terminal.

=== Bus ===
NY Waterway offers two shuttle bus routes serving River Road and three intra-site routes serving the Port Imperial district. Buses operate rush hours only and at no cost. Weehawken Township also operates a shuttle bus on weekdays. In May 2013 NY Waterway initiated afternoon bus service along the NJT bus routes 158, and 159R, which travel north to Fort Lee, and 156R, with continuing service to Englewood Cliffs.

NJ Transit Bus routes 23, 156, 158, 159 stop adjacent to the rail station in the southbound direction and outside the ferry terminal in the northbound direction.

=== Light rail ===
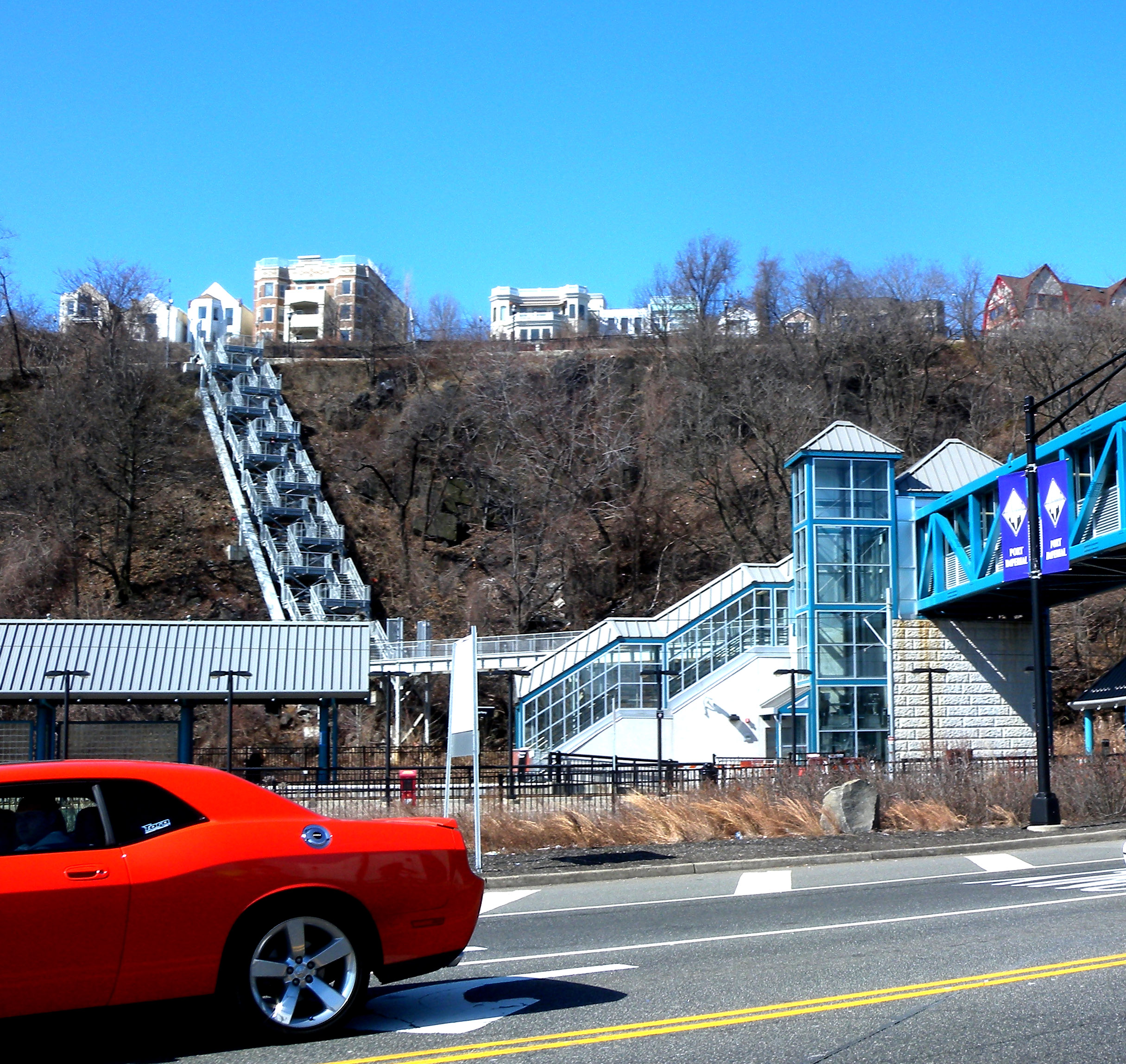
Stairways to station

In June 2012, NJT and NY Waterway began a fare-sharing program for riders transferring between the light rail and ferries for ten-trip and monthly tickets holders, in a program called Surf and Turf.

== See also ==
- Paulus Hook Ferry Terminal
- List of ferries across the Hudson River to New York City
