= Transfer station =

Transfer station may refer to:

- Transfer station (waste management)
- Transfer station (transportation), an interchange station
- Transfer Station (Hudson County), a section of Hudson County
