= List of Public Service Railway lines =

The Public Service Railway operated the following streetcar lines in the U.S. state of New Jersey. Public Service assigned odd numbers to streetcar routes (as shown here) and even numbers to bus routes.

== Bergen Division ==
Route	Terminals		Major streets	History	Current status
1 Hudson River	Edgewater Ferry Terminal, Edgewater	Paterson Broadway Terminal			part of the 751 bus route (east of Hackensack); 770 bus route (west of Hackensack)
3 Fort Lee	Edgewater Ferry Terminal, Edgewater	Leonia			part of the 755 bus route
5 Englewood	Edgewater Ferry Terminal, Edgewater	Tenafly			part of the 166 bus route (north of Palisades Park)
5 Paterson-Suffern	Paterson Broadway Terminal	Suffern, New York			roughly the 746 bus route (south of Ridgewood)
9 Coytesville	Edgewater Ferry Terminal, Edgewater	Coytesville		History	Replacement buses

== Central Division ==
Route	Terminals		Major streets	History	Current status
1 South Amboy	New Brunswick	South Amboy			roughly part of the 815 bus route
3 Middlesex	New Brunswick	Perth Amboy			814 bus route (west of Bonhamtown); 813 bus route (east of Bonhamtown)
5 Rahway	Perth Amboy	Westfield			
7 Carteret	junction with Newark-Trenton Fast Line	Carteret			part of the 62 bus route
9 Highland Park	New Brunswick	Piscatawaytown			roughly part of the 810 bus route (east of downtown New Brunswick)
11 Elizabeth	Newark	Elizabeth			
13 Easton	New Brunswick				part of the 811 bus route
15 New Brunswick-Trenton	New Brunswick	Trenton			
27 Aldene	Elizabeth	Aldene			part of the 58 bus route
27 Elmora	Elizabeth	Elmora			part of the 58 bus route
27 Raritan	New Brunswick	Raritan			
29 Jefferson	Elizabeth				
45 Perth Amboy	Newark	Perth Amboy			part of the 62 bus route
47 New Brunswick-Newark	Newark	New Brunswick			
49 Union	Newark	Bound Brook			59 bus route (east of Dunellen) part of the 114 bus route (west of Dunellen)

== Essex Division ==
Route	Terminals		Major streets	History	Current status
1 Newark	Newark Public Service Terminal	Exchange Place			part of the 1 bus route
3 Bergen	Newark				
5 Kinney	Newark				roughly part of the 34 (east of downtown Newark) part of the 5 bus route (west of downtown Newark)
7 City Subway	Broad St. (renamed "Military Park" in 2012); Newark Penn Station	Franklin Ave. (renamed "Branch Brook Park" in 2012); Grove St.	Morris Canal bed	Newark City Subway	Still exists; incorporated into Newark Light Rail
7 Weequahic	Newark				roughly part of the 39 bus route
9 Clifton	Newark				part of the 99 bus route
13 Broad	Newark	Nutley			part of the 13 bus route
15 Nutley	Newark	Nutley			part of the 13 bus route
17 Paterson	Newark	Paterson			part of the 13 bus route (south of Nutley) part of the 74 bus route (north of Nutley)
19 Crosstown	Orange	Bloomfield			roughly part of the 92 bus route
21 Orange	Newark	Orange			21 bus route
23 Central	Newark	Orange			part of the 24 bus route
25 Springfield	Newark	Maplewood			roughly part of the 34 bus route (east of downtown Newark); 25 bus route (west of downtown Newark)
27 Mount Prospect	Newark				part of the 27 bus route
29 Bloomfield	Newark	Bloomfield or Caldwell			part of the 29 bus route (Caldwell) part of the 72 bus route (Bloomfield)
31 South Orange	Newark	Maplewood			roughly part of the 25 bus route (east of downtown) part of the 31 bus route (west of downtown Newark)
33 Market	Newark				part of the 1 bus route
35 Kearny	Hillside	North Arlington			part of the 59 bus route (south of downtown Newark) roughly part of the 39 and 76 bus routes (north of downtown Newark)
37 Hackensack	Newark	Edgewater Ferry Terminal, Edgewater	Ridge Road, Park Avenue, Hackensack Street, Court Street, Degraw Avenue		roughly the 76 (south of Hackensack) part of the 751 bus route (east of Hackensack)
39 Harrison	Newark	North Arlington			part of the 39 bus route
41 Montrose	Orange	South Orange			
43 Jersey City	Newark Public Service Terminal	Exchange Place			43 bus route
51 Irvington		Irvington			part of the 13 bus route
59 Valley Road	East Orange	Montclair			part of the 34 and 28 bus routes

== Hudson Division ==
Route	Terminals		Major streets	History	Current status
1 Newark	Newark Public Service Terminal	Exchange Place	Essex Division train through Hudson County		part of the 1 bus route
3 Newark Avenue	Jersey City		Newark Avenue		
5 Pacific Avenue	Jersey City				
7 Jackson	Hudson Place (Hoboken)	Bayonne	Courthouse Jackson Ave	elevated	87 bus route (north of Bayonne) part of 81 bus route (in Bayonne)
9 Newark Avenue	Jersey City				
11 Montgomery	Jersey City				roughly the 80 bus route
13 Greenville	Jersey City	Bayonne			81 bus route
15 Passaic	Hudson Place (Hoboken)	Paterson Broadway Terminal	Transfer Station		roughly part of the 85 bus route (south of Secaucus)
17 Summit	Hudson Place (Hoboken)	Transfer Station		elevated	part of 85 bus route
19 Union City	Hudson Place (Hoboken) or West Shore Ferry Terminal	Hudson Place (Hoboken) or West Shore Ferry Terminal	Bergenline; Pershing Road	Union Hill	roughly part of the 89 bus route
21 West New York	Hudson Place (Hoboken); 14th Street (Hoboken); West Shore Ferry Terminal,	Nungesser's	Willow Avenue; Pershing Road		part of the 89 bus route (south of Union City) part of the 181 bus route (north of Union City)
23 Palisade	West Shore Ferry Terminal	Fort Lee	Pershing Road		
25 Weehawken	Hudson Place (Hoboken)	West Shore Ferry Terminal, Weehawken	Willow Avenue; Pershing Road		
27 Pavonia	Pavonia Terminal	Transfer Station			roughly the 82 bus route
29 Hudson	Exchange Place	Secaucus	Transfer Station		82 bus route (south of Union City)
31 Grove	Exchange Place	Hudson Place (Hoboken)			
33 Crosstown	Pavonia Terminal	Communipaw Junction	Jersey City		
33 West Hoboken	Hudson Place (Hoboken)	Union City			
35 Bergen	Exchange Place or Hudson Place	Hackensack Plank Road	Hackensack		roughly the 83 bus route
35 Journal Square	Jersey City				
35 Secaucus	Jersey City	Secaucus	Paterson Plank Road	Transfer Station	
37 Oakland	Hudson Place (Hoboken)	Jersey City	Courthouse	elevated	rush hour service
39 Willow	Hudson Place (Hoboken)	14th Street (Hoboken)	Willow Avenue		
57 South Kearny	Jersey City	Kearny			
59 Federal	Exchange Place	Kearny	Montgomery Street	1943–1945	

== Passaic Division ==
Route	Terminals		Major streets	History	Current status
3 Singac	Paterson Broadway Terminal	Singac			part of the 704 bus route
7 Governor	Paterson				
9 Park Avenue	Paterson Broadway Terminal	Paterson			part of the 744 bus route
11 Totowa	Paterson	Totowa			roughly part of the 704 and 722 bus routes (northeast of downtown Paterson)
13 Haledon	Paterson	Haledon			part of the 703 bus route
76 Paterson Orange	Paterson station	Orange station			

== Southern Division ==
Route	Terminals		Major streets	History	Current status
5 Haddon Heights	Pennsylvania-Reading Seashore Lines (Pennsylvania RR, Camden & Amboy RR) Federal St. Ferry Terminal, Camden	Clementon Lake Amusement Park, Clementon	Haddon Ave., Atlantic Ave.	By 1935, a 1 trolley shuttle at the Clementon end, then All Service Vehicles, later part of the 50 & 53 bus routes	no exact service in 2012
