= Pershing Road =

Pershing Road may refer to:

- Pershing Road (Chicago), Illinois, United States
- Pershing Road (Weehawken), New Jersey, United States
