= Imperatore =

Imperatore is a surname. Notable people with the surname include:

- Arthur Imperatore Sr. (1925–2020), American businessman
- Salvador Imperatore (born 1950), Chilean football referee

It is also a nickname. Notable people with the nickname include:

- Adriano Leite Ribeiro (born 1982), Brazilian footballer

== See also ==
- Campo Imperatore
