= Pershing Road (Weehawken) =

Road ascending the Hudson Palisades in Weehawken, New Jersey

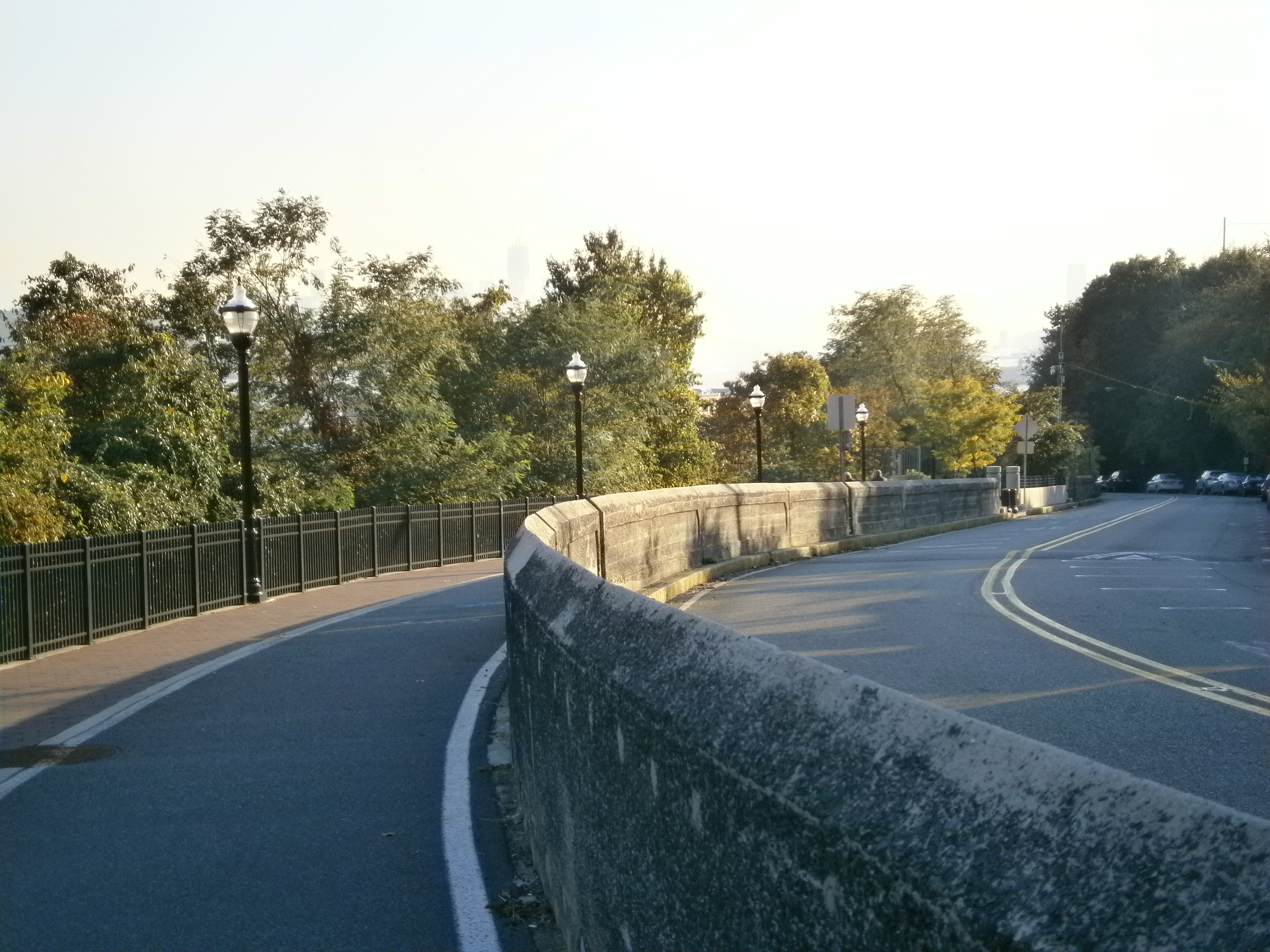
- View looking south from top of Pershing Road near Boulevard East
- Interactive map of Pershing Road
- Part of: CR 682
- Namesake: John J. Pershing
- Owner: Township of Weehawken
- Maintained by: Weehawken Public Works
- Length: 0.42 mi (0.68 km)
- Location: Hudson County, New Jersey
- Nearest metro station: Port Imperial (Hudson–Bergen Light Rail)
- Coordinates: 40.774887°N 74.013176°W
- South end: Carlyle Court in Weehawken
- North end: CR 505 (Boulevard East) in Weehawken

Pershing Road is a road located entirely in Weehawken, New Jersey that travels for 0.42 miles (0.68 km) on the Hudson Palisades between Boulevard East and Weehawken Port Imperial, and carries the designation Hudson County Route 682. At County Route 505 (Boulevard East), the road meets 48th Street (County Route 684), one of the very few two-way streets in the urban grid of North Hudson, which travels west to Bergenline Avenue and Kennedy Boulevard. It is named for World War I hero John J. Pershing. Earlier names have included Clifton Road, named for the estate on whose land it was located, and Hillside Road, which would speak to its location.

Pershing Road, like the Hackensack Plank Road and the Paterson Plank Road, provides access between the Hudson River waterfront and the top of the cliffs and ascends parallel to the face of the escarpment. Between 1892 and 1949, street cars, initially operated by the North Hudson Railway Company, and later the Public Service Railway lines 9-Coytesville 19-Union City, 21-West New York, 23-Palisade, and 25-Weehawken ran along the road to the Weehawken Terminal, where ferries traversing the river to Manhattan departed.

From 1913 until the 1927 opening of the Holland Tunnel, Pershing Road was a component of the Lincoln Highway, the first transcontinental highway in the United States. The bridge at the foot of the road, comprising jack arches, was built in 1927, originally crossing over the West Shore Railroad, later Conrail's River Line, and now the Hudson Bergen Light Rail. A broad public stairway known as the Grauert Causeway met the road at the base of the cliff at a viaduct crossing over a rail right of way. Now abandoned, it has been replaced by a metal stairwell structure which connects to the Port Imperial station. Pershing Road Park along the Hudson River Waterfront Walkway is near the foot of the road.

The road was proposed as part of the Port Imperial Street Circuit of the Grand Prix of America.

The foot of the road is the Hudson Riverfront 9/11 Memorial, Weehawken's memorial to the September 11 attacks, which was completed in September 2011.

== Major intersections ==
The entire route is in Weehawken, Hudson County.

mi	km	Destinations	Notes
0.00	0.00	Carlyle Court	To Port Imperial Boulevard and station
0.06– 0.10	0.097– 0.16	Bridge over the Hudson–Bergen Light Rail tracks	
0.42	0.68	John F. Kennedy Boulevard East (CR 505)	
1.000 mi = 1.609 km; 1.000 km = 0.621 mi

== See also ==
- Hackensack Plank Road
- Shippen Street (Weehawken)
- Bulls Ferry Road
- Gorge Road
