= Port Imperial Street Circuit =

United States Street Circuit

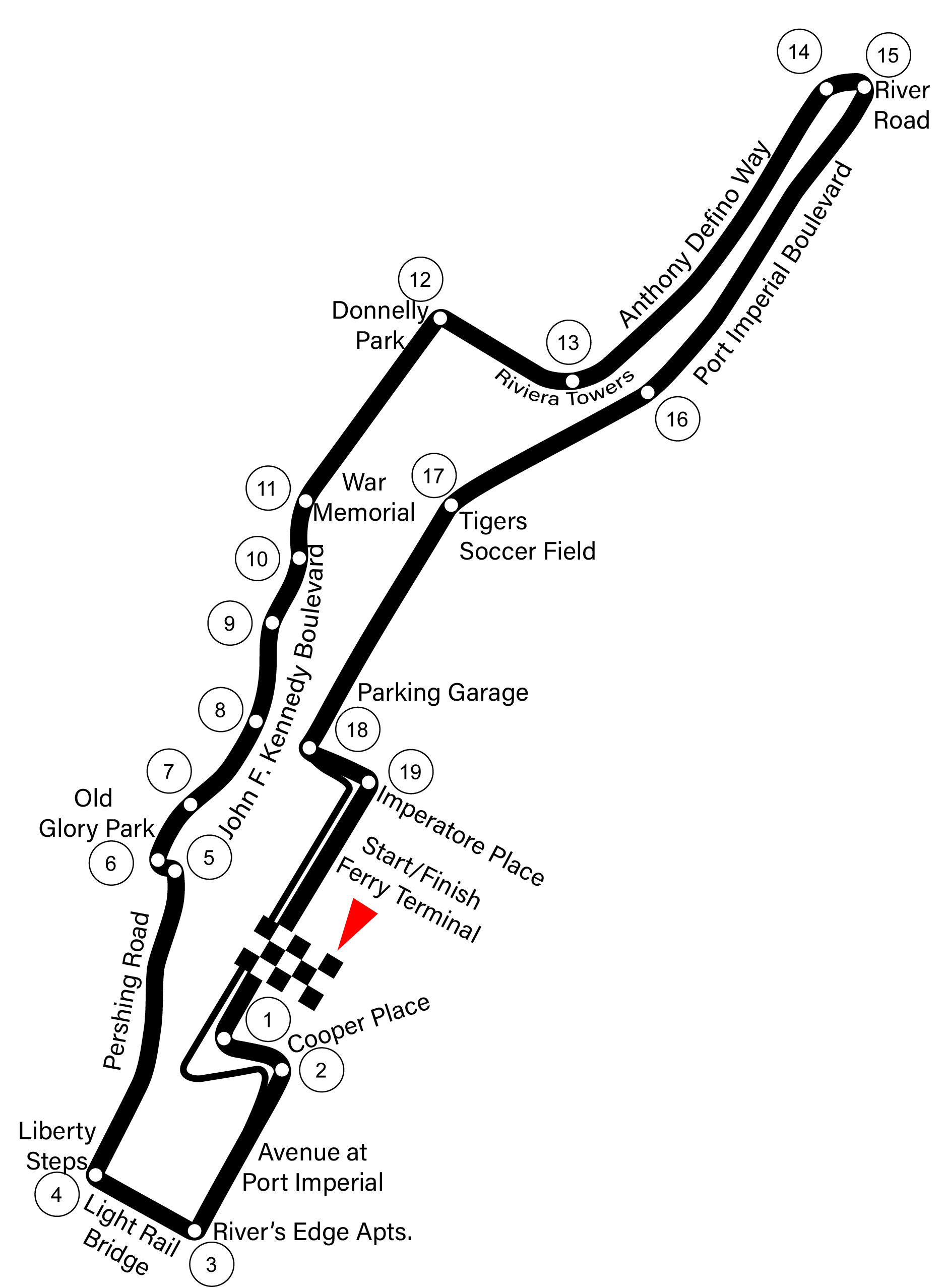
- Location: Weehawken and West New York, New Jersey
- Coordinates: 40.776853°N 74.011120°W
- Architect: Hermann Tilke
- Length: 3.20 mi (5.15 km)
- Turns: 19

The Port Imperial Street Circuit was a 2011 plan for a 3.2 mi (5.1 km) motor racing circuit in Weehawken and West New York, New Jersey, in the United States, to be constructed on the Hudson Waterfront around Weehawken Port Imperial.

== History ==
It was first announced in October 2011 to host the Grand Prix of America, a race of the FIA Formula One World Championship. Originally intended to debut on the calendar in 2013, the race was subject to a series of postponements and delays stemming from financial difficulties, failure to obtain approval from the FIA, a lack of preparedness from organisers, and a contractual dispute.

When the inaugural 2013 race was dropped from the calendar, Formula One President and CEO Bernie Ecclestone stated that the promoters were in breach of contract and that new proposals from other parties would be welcome. The race was repeatedly added then removed from future Formula One provisional calendars, and dropped completely from even the provisional calendar by 2016.

== Location and design ==
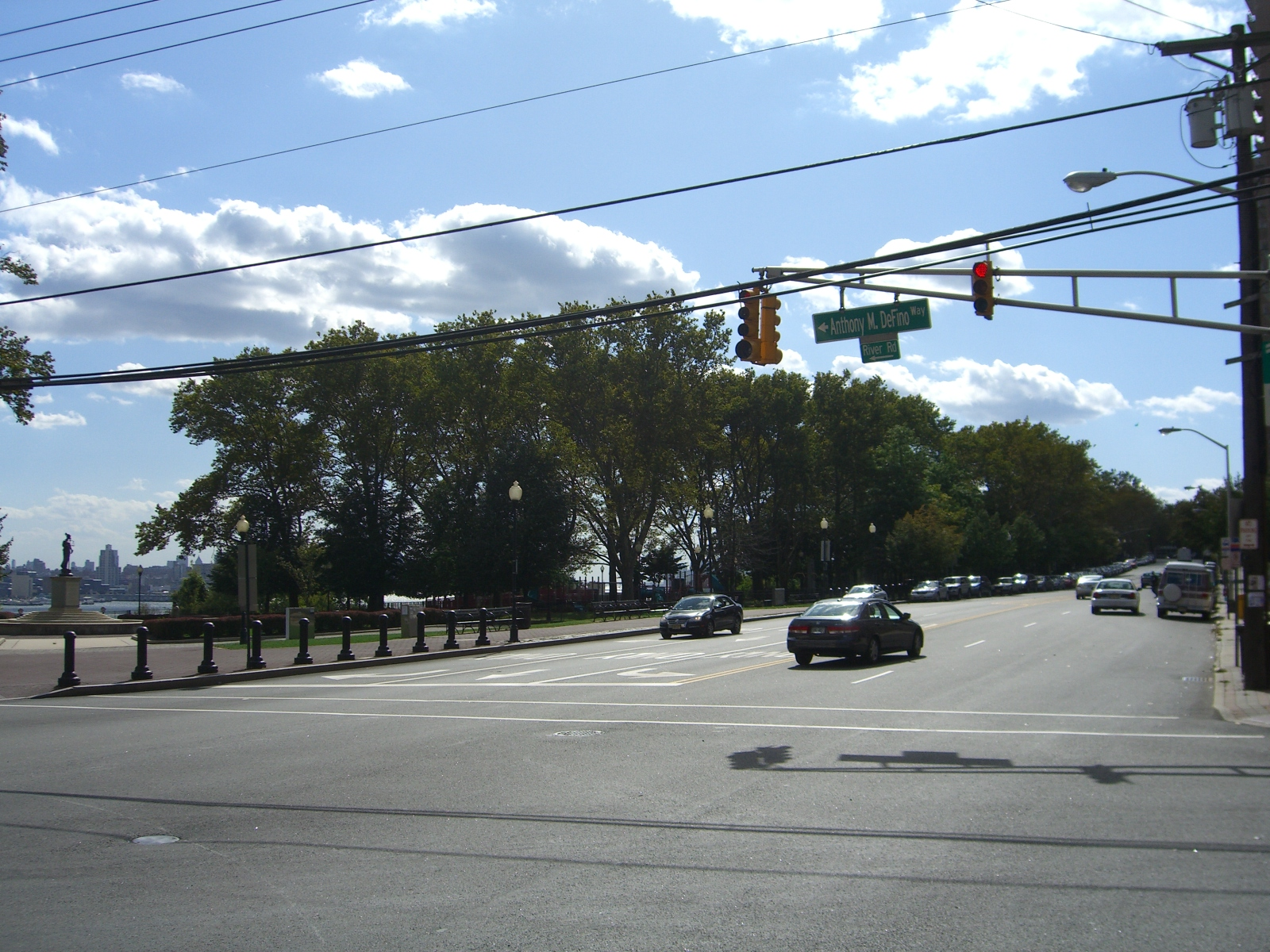
The junction of Boulevard East and 60th Street, at the circuit's highest point

The site of the circuit was made after several years of searching for an appropriate venue in the New York Metropolitan Area and was chosen for its location near the Hudson River and Hudson Palisades, offering sweeping skyline views, elevation changes and access to public transportation.

The circuit, designed by German track designer Hermann Tilke, was to have run clockwise. The start line was to be located next to the NY Waterway ferry terminal, with the pits and paddock located between the ferry terminal and Port Imperial Boulevard. The first sector of the circuit would have run along the Hudson River Waterfront Walkway, designed to allow the cars to race through Port Imperial before climbing the Hudson Palisades along Pershing Road. The circuit was then to follow Boulevard East north to Donnelly Memorial Park, where it would have turned right and descended Anthony M. DeFino Way to a hairpin turn adjacent to the West New York sewage treatment plant. The circuit would then have returned south to the ferry terminal via Port Imperial Boulevard. The elevation change from Port Imperial to the Palisades, some 150 feet (46 meters), would have given the circuit one of the greatest elevation changes on the calendar.

Although the circuit would have passed residential areas, residents would not have been cut off from their homes; the organizers planned to provide access to the seven affected residences. The organizers further planned to fund the race without any public money.

== Promotional runs ==
In June 2012, Sebastian Vettel did a promotional test run along the proposed route, describing it as "exceptional" before going on to add that it would become a favorite among drivers. Commenting on the elevation changes and turns he said he was reminded of the Circuit de Spa-Francorchamps and the Circuit de Monaco. According to Vettel, the circuit would be made up of "quick, floating corners", and he expected cars would reach speeds of over 200 mph, with the net result being that the circuit would reward the bravest drivers. In August 2012, David Coulthard drove portions of the course to test out the roadways as part of the creation of a promotional video for Red Bull Racing featuring the street circuit and environs.

== Construction planning ==
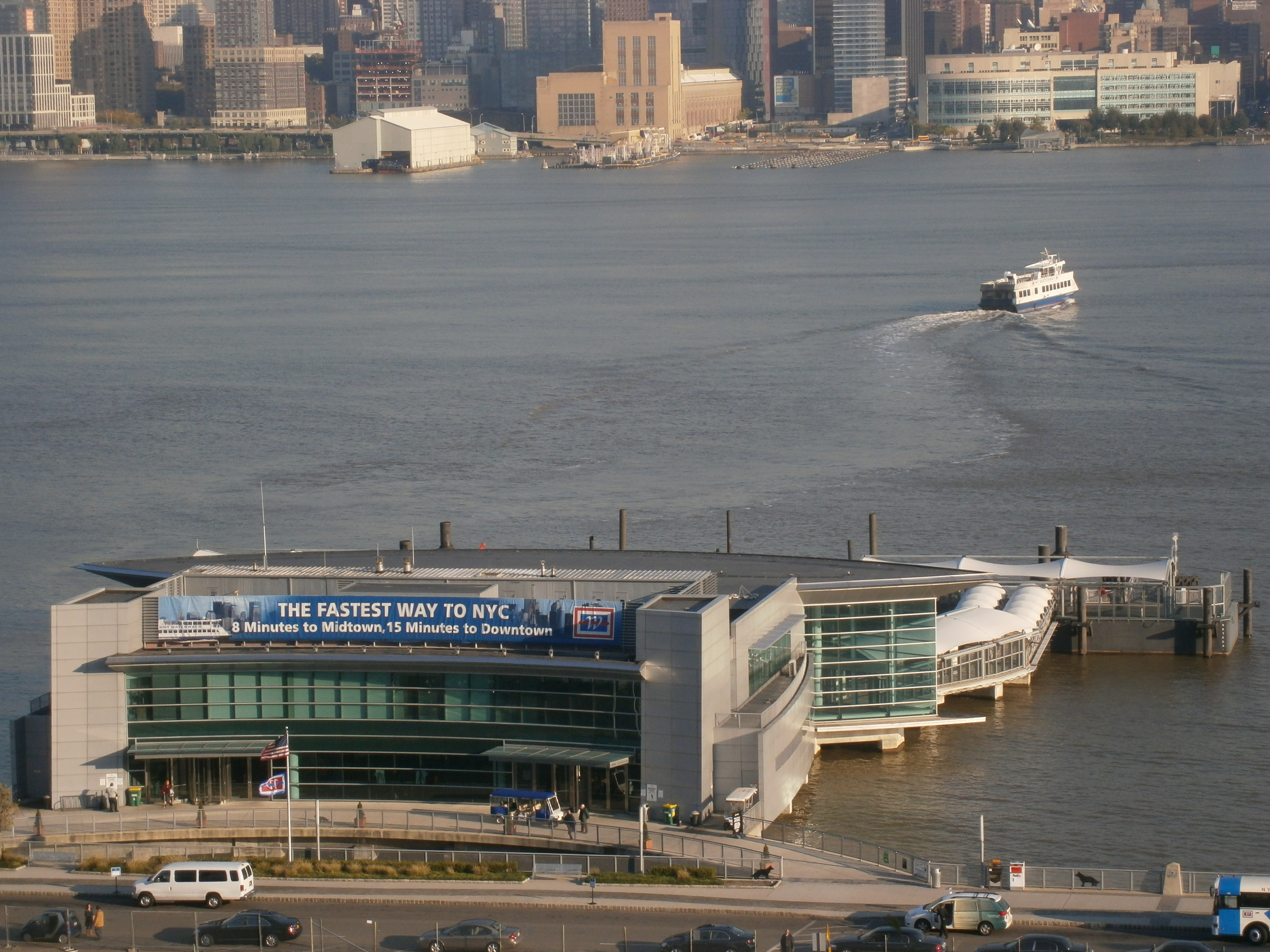
The Weehawken Port Imperial ferry terminal, adjacent to the start/finish line

Event organiser Leo Hindery announced in June 2013 that the race had received all necessary local permits and that 31 contractors were engaged in preparation work for the course. The circuit was to consist entirely of existing roads, removing the need to build any sections of circuit exclusively for the race, with the exception of the pit lane. A contract between the municipalities and the race promoters was signed in June 2013. That month, a long-awaited bridge between the building and the Port Imperial Hudson–Bergen Light Rail station, seen as an important component of public access to the circuit, was opened.

Construction of a previously planned parking garage at the NY Waterway ferry terminal, which was intended for use as race headquarters and paddock, with space for twenty-four pit garages., began in July 2012. As envisioned, the ground floor of the building would normally have functioned as retail space, to be transformed each year for use by the race. Construction was completed in the Summer of 2013. In November 2013 ground was broken for two hotels to be built above the parking facility.

Resurfacing and other work on the roads to be used was planned for August to November 2013. In order to create a smooth surface, repaving was to be done in a staggered line or "echelon" so that asphalt will not cool as lanes were poured. It remained to be determined whether potential obstacles such as fire hydrants and traffic lights would have been moved.

It was considered for the barriers used for the defunct Valencia Street Circuit to be used for the circuit.
