= Grand Prix of America =

Formula One Grand Prix proposal

- Port Imperial Street Circuit
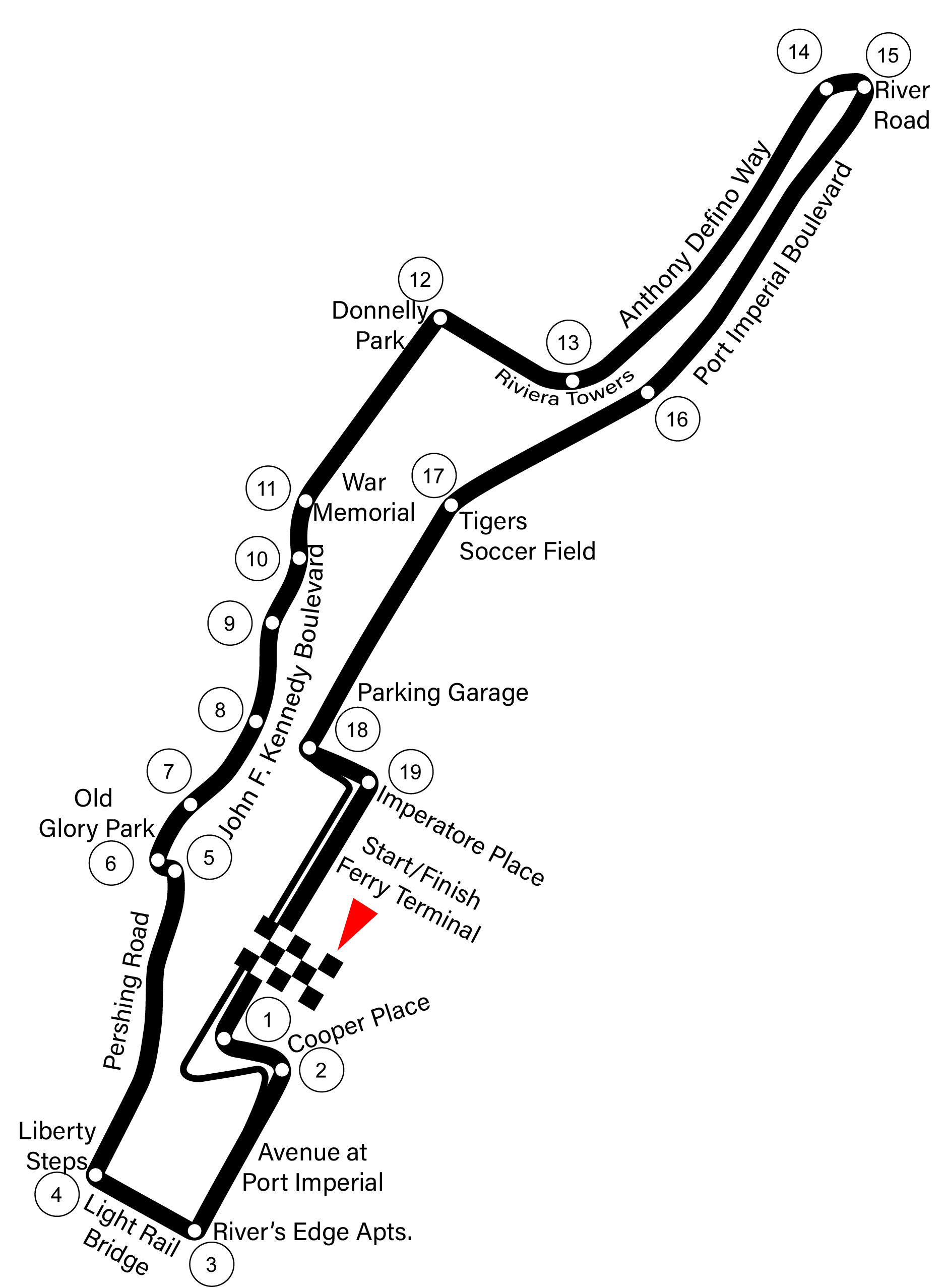

Race information
- Circuit length: 5.15 km (3.20 miles)

The Grand Prix of America was a failed Formula One World Championship race proposal. In 2011, plans were revealed for the race for target planned entry into the 2013 Formula One World Championship. The plan was to hold the race on the proposed 5.2 km (3.2 mi) Port Imperial Street Circuit through the New Jersey towns of West New York and Weehawken near Weehawken Port Imperial, with the Hudson River and New York City skyline as a panoramic backdrop.

The Grand Prix of America had planned to have its first event on June 16, 2013, but was not run in 2013. In late 2013, Formula One President and CEO Bernie Ecclestone stated that the promoters were in breach of contract and that new proposals from other parties would be welcome. The race was repeatedly added then removed from future Formula One provisional calendars, and dropped completely from even the provisional calendar by 2016.

== History ==
A Grand Prix in the New York metropolitan area was announced for the 1983 season, to be held either at the Meadowlands Sports Complex in New Jersey, Meadow Lake in Flushing Meadows in Queens, or Mitchel Field in Hempstead, Long Island (on the same site as the 1936 and 1937 Vanderbilt Cups). However, the race was first postponed and then canceled. It was also scheduled for 1984 and 1985, but never managed to get off the ground. CART then started their own race at the Meadowlands.

In May 2010, Formula One supremo Bernie Ecclestone announced plans to bring a Formula One race to New York City for the 2012 season. Ecclestone was quoted as saying the race would take place across the Hudson River in New Jersey, with the Manhattan skyline overlooking the circuit. Later that month, plans emerged for a circuit to be built in Jersey City's Liberty State Park, but those plans were abandoned shortly thereafter. While searching for a venue for the race, Staten Island, Floyd Bennett Field and Meadowlands were all explored, but none were considered viable.

In August 2011, The Wall Street Journal reported on a proposal for a street circuit in Weehawken and West New York, New Jersey, putting forward 2013 as a potential start date. Two months later, in October, The Wall Street Journal further reported that the race would be going ahead in June 2013. Other sources were much more cautious, claiming that the race still needed approval from Hudson County officials before the race could go ahead. Later that month, a revised proposal was put forward, tracing a street circuit that ran through Port Imperial, climbing the Hudson Palisades to Boulevard East before descending the Palisades to rejoin Port Imperial Boulevard. On October 25, 2011, it was officially confirmed that New Jersey would host the Grand Prix of America from 2013 onwards on a 3.2-mile (5.2-km) street circuit.

The event was originally on a ten-year contract, starting in June 2013 so as not to clash with the November running of the United States Grand Prix in Austin. It was to be "paired" – held within one week in the interests of cutting down on the costs of logistics – with the Canadian Grand Prix in Montreal.

Long-time NASCAR promoter Humpy Wheeler was a consultant to the race, which had been expected to provide over US$100 million annually to the economy of the New York/New Jersey area. Leo Hindery, Jr. was the race promoter and director, with Dennis Robinson as the COO. Tom Cotter stepped down as president on August 20, 2012.

Christian Epp of Tilke America described the intended layout as a street circuit with elevation changes similar to the Monaco Street Circuit, but with a higher average lap speed unique among street circuits.

=== Postponement ===
In July 2012, Bernie Ecclestone confirmed that New Jersey had been included on the Fédération Internationale de l'Automobile (FIA) 2013 Grand Prix schedule on its 2013 calendar as the Grand Prix of Jersey (New York) and in September of the same year, the race was given a provisional date of June 16, 2013. The future of the race was however cast in doubt when a few days later Ecclestone announced that the contract for the race had been annulled.

In September 2012, Ecclestone announced that the circuit's contract had been annulled since the organizers had not complied with the terms and conditions of the contract. However, the race was provisionally included on the official 2013 Formula One calendar, with its status listed as 'to be confirmed'. That schedule was finalized in December 2012. On October 18, 2012, the mayor of Weehawken announced that the race would be postponed until 2014. When asked about the reasons behind the postponement, Ecclestone replied that the organizers could not have everything necessary to host the race arranged in time for 2013.

In March 2013, race promoter Hindery Jr. said that the Grand Prix of America was back on track and that critical pavement work would start around September when the weather was most conducive to do such work.

Hindery's organization was beset with financial difficulties and it remained unclear how the race would be funded, with New Jersey Governor Chris Christie saying that there had been no discussion of the state subsidizing it, as is common for other such events. In May 2013, speculation in the media suggested that Bernie Ecclestone was attempting to return Formula One to the Long Beach circuit as an alternative to the race in New Jersey, though Ecclestone expressed hope the stalled talks with Hindery could be renewed, adding that the sport's administrators had invested in the race to pay off the organisers' debts and expedite the construction process. Chris Pook, who originally established the United States Grand Prix West in Long Beach, but switched it to a CART race in 1984, was also enlisted as a consultant to the Grand Prix of America.

In June 2013, it was announced that race organizer Leo Hindery had signed a new, 15-year contract with F1 chief Bernie Ecclestone after all permits had been secured. Work on the permanent 24-car paddock area was near completion, while paving on the road course could begin "as early as next week," well ahead of the earlier planned September 2013 start date.

On August 23, 2013, Ecclestone announced that the 2014 Grand Prix of America was canceled because the promoters could not raise the $100 million required for the event planning. The race was not included on the provisional 2014 calendar, with race promoters claiming an administrative error.

During the telecast of the 2013 Singapore Grand Prix on September 22, 2013, it was announced on-air that Leo Hindery, Jr and promoters had submitted all necessary entry fees for inclusion on the 2014 calendar, with a provisional date of June 1, 2014 (between the Monaco and Canadian Grands Prix). The Grand Prix was later confirmed on the provisional calendar. The FIA released the official 2014 Formula One season calendar on December 4, 2013, and the Grand Prix did not appear on the schedule. At the same time, the FIA announced that the race had been postponed due to a number of long-term financial problems. Ecclestone apparently had not given up on the race itself; stating that he had "no doubt" that the race would take place in 2015. Organizers were working on financial restructuring and were also optimistic. In December 2013, Ecclestone said the organizers were in breach of contract and that he would entertain proposals from other parties.

There had not been much news regarding the race in 2014, until an article in Forbes written in July revealed that Hindery had found investors to fund the race, but they dropped out at the last minute, and Ecclestone revealed that he was not willing to put the race on a Formula One calendar until 2016. There have been no further updates, and all mention of running the race has been dropped since the 2015 racing season.

According to a March 2014 report in Forbes, Formula E chief executive Alejandro Agag revealed that he had been working with promoters to bring the series to the New York area, but that he was waiting to see how the financial situation surrounding the Grand Prix was resolved before he could commit to bringing the Formula E series to the city.
