= Weehawken Terminal =

Former intermodal terminal in Weehawken, New Jersey

Weehawken
- Weehawken Terminal and yard, circa 1955

General information
- Coordinates: 40.771639°N 74.012750°W
- Operator: New York Central Railroad (NYC)
- Line: West Shore Railroad
- Tracks: 16
- Train operators: NYC, NYO&W, NYS&W (limited)
- Connections: US Passenger rail transport ferry/water interchange

History
- Opened: 1884
- Closed: 1959

Services
Preceding station	New York Central Railroad	Following station
Terminus	Weehawken Ferry	Cortlandt Street Terminus
Ridgefield Park toward Buffalo–Exchange Street	River Division	Terminus
New Durham toward Buffalo–Exchange Street	River Division	Terminus
Preceding station	New York, Ontario and Western Railway	Following station
Cornwall toward Oswego	Main Line	Terminus
Location

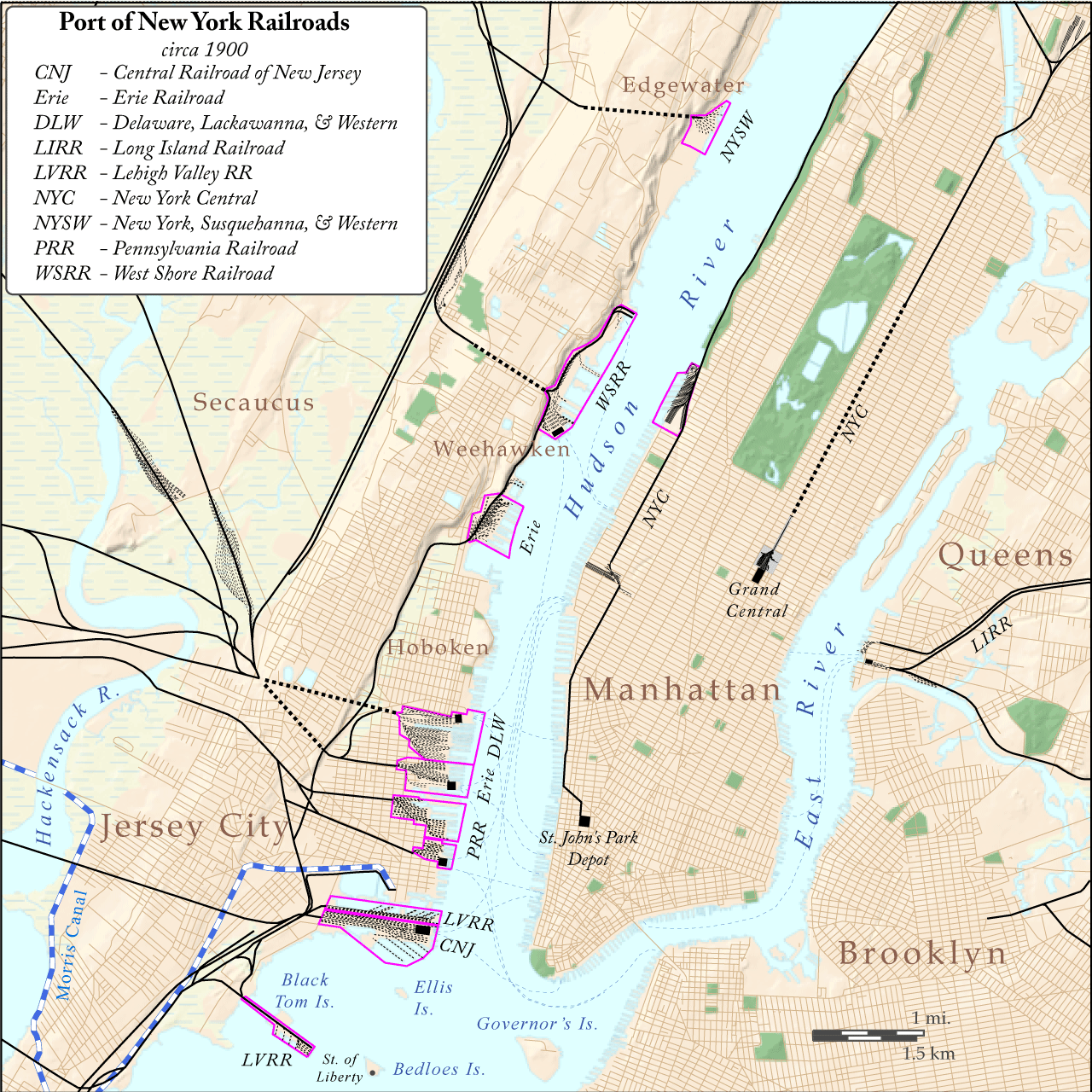
Map of the five train-to-ferry transfer points along the west shore of the Hudson River circa 1900

Weehawken Terminal was the waterfront intermodal terminal on the North River (Hudson River) in Weehawken, New Jersey for the New York Central Railroad's West Shore Railroad division, whose route traveled along the west shore of the Hudson River. It opened in 1884 and closed in 1959. The complex contained five ferry slips, sixteen passenger train tracks, car float facilities, and extensive yards. The facility was also used by the New York, Ontario and Western Railway. The terminal was one of five passenger railroad terminals that lined the Hudson Waterfront during the 19th and 20th centuries; the others were located at Hoboken, Pavonia, Exchange Place and Communipaw, with Hoboken being the only one still in use.

Today, the site is the location of Weehawken Port Imperial, an inter-modal transit hub used by New Jersey Transit buses, the Hudson Bergen Light Rail and New York Waterway.

== Weehawken Ferry ==
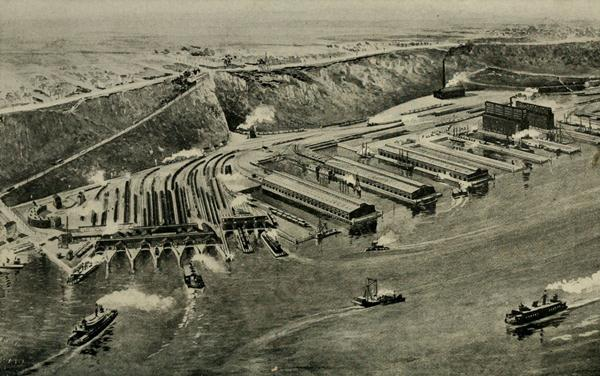
Weehawken waterfront, c. 1900, with Weehawken Terminal at left

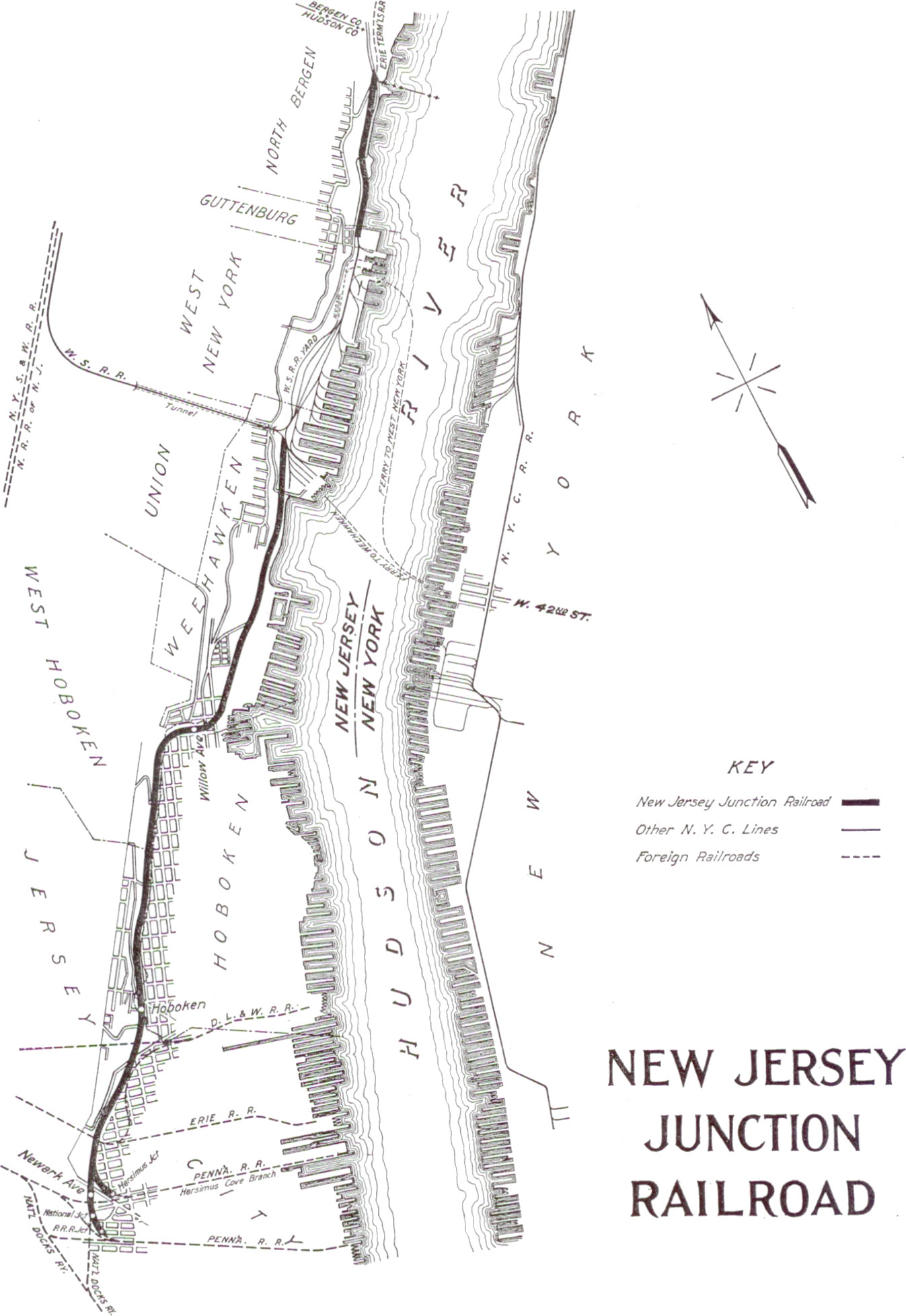
New York Central's New Jersey Junction Railroad connected to facilities on the Hudson River waterfront to the south, 1921. The ROW later became River Line (Conrail) and eventually the HBLR.

A patent for a ferry route from Weehawken to Manhattan was first granted by Governor of New York Richard Coote in 1700. It was a sail and row service later superseded by steamboat service, notably at Hoboken in 1834.

The route then operated sporadically for years, and became the object of a legislative investigation in 1870. It was purchased by the New Jersey Midland Railway in 1871. From 1913 until the 1927 opening of the Holland Tunnel, it was a component of the National Old Trails Road and the Lincoln Highway, two of the oldest transcontinental highways in the United States. Both began at Times Square, crossed the river and traveled up Hudson Palisades along Pershing Road. In addition to 42nd Street, boats also traveled to Cortlandt Street Ferry Depot in lower Manhattan. The Weehawken was the last ferry to the terminal on March 25, 1959, at 1:10 am, ending 259 years of continuous ferry service.

In 1986, New York Waterway reinstated passenger ferry service to Weehawken with the construction of a new ferry terminal. Ferries travel to Pier 79, Battery Park City Ferry Terminal. and Pier 11/Wall Street.

== Railroad lines ==
The West Shore Railroad maintained extensive routes to the north and west. The New York Central bought the New York, West Shore and Buffalo Railway on November 24, 1885, and reorganized its new acquisition as the West Shore Railroad on December 5, immediately leasing it for 475 years from January 1, 1886. Trains departed the terminal and traveled under Bergen Hill, as the southern portion of the Hudson Palisades is known, in the Weehawken Tunnel: a tunnel that had been built in the three preceding years. They traveled inland and north along the Palisade ridge between the competing Erie Railroad Northern Branch and Pascack Valley Line. At Haverstraw the route returned to the river and proceeded north to Kingston and Albany, and eventually to Buffalo. Suburban service to the Northern Valley in Bergen County and Rockland County included stops at Bogota, Dumont, Tappan, and Nyack. In the early 1990s there were studies made to consider the revival of service along the right-of-way to Nyack.

The NYO&W mainline ran to Oswego, a port city on Lake Ontario. It had branch lines to Scranton, Pennsylvania and to Kingston; Port Jervis; Delhi; Utica and Rome in New York. Using the same tunnel, the New York Central also operated the New Jersey Junction Railroad south to Jersey City and the New Jersey Shore Line Railroad north to Edgewater. The NYO&W last had passenger service to Weehawken on September 10, 1953. Portions of those rights-of-way became part of Conrail's River Line and subsequently the Hudson–Bergen Light Rail.

== Other transportation ==
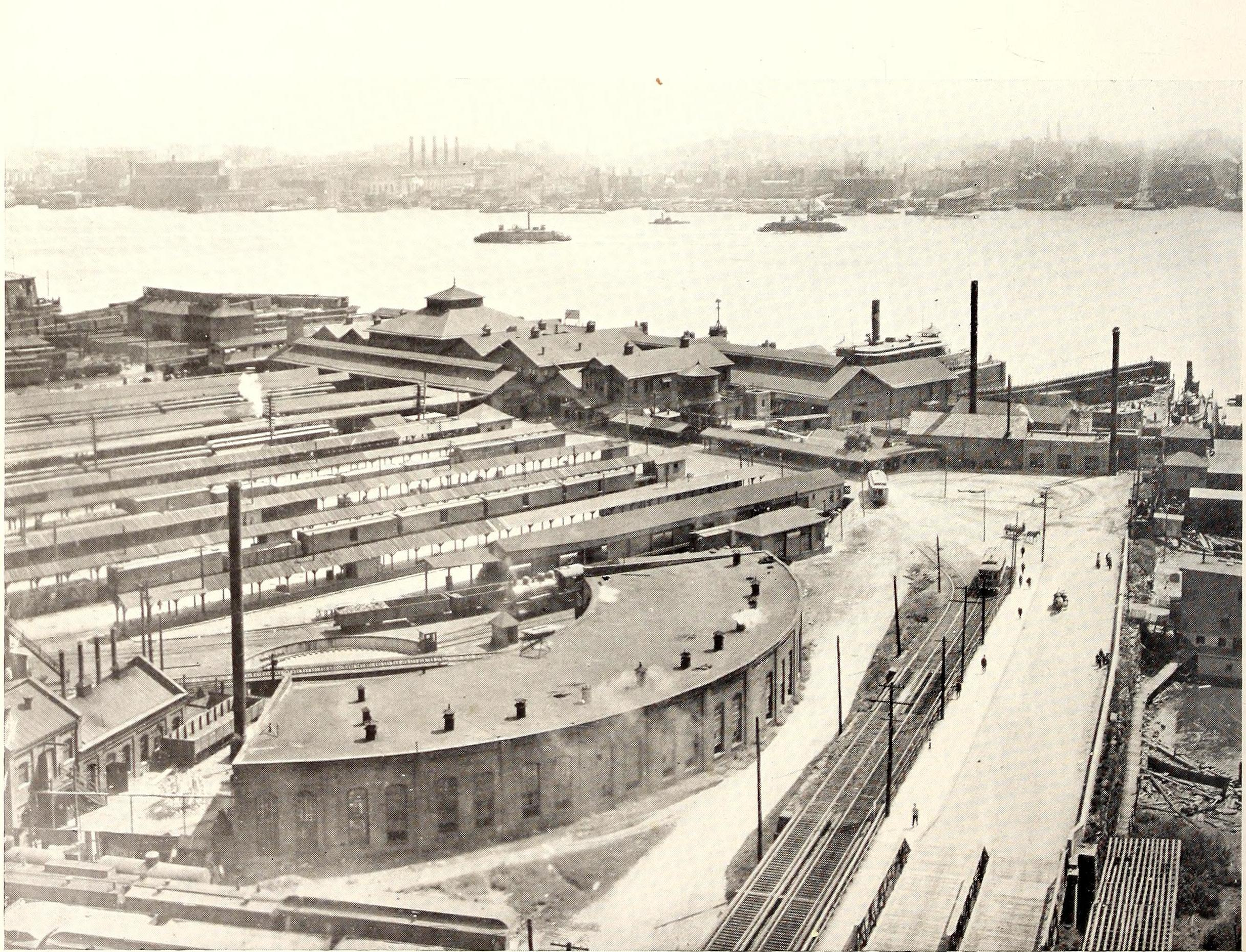
Streetcars at Weehawken Terminal ca. 1911

Between 1892 and 1949 streetcars, initially operated by the North Hudson County Railway and later the Public Service Railway as lines 19 Union City, 21 West New York, 23 Palisade, 25 Weehawken, ran along Pershing Road providing local access to the terminal.

For a brief period in the 1890s the terminal was also served by a massive elevator structure which transported passengers to a trestle where they could board additional streetcars. The trestle streetcars serviced three well-known entertainment venues — the Eldorado; a pleasure garden which overlooked the Eldorado; and Nungesser's Guttenberg Racetrack.

== Site ==
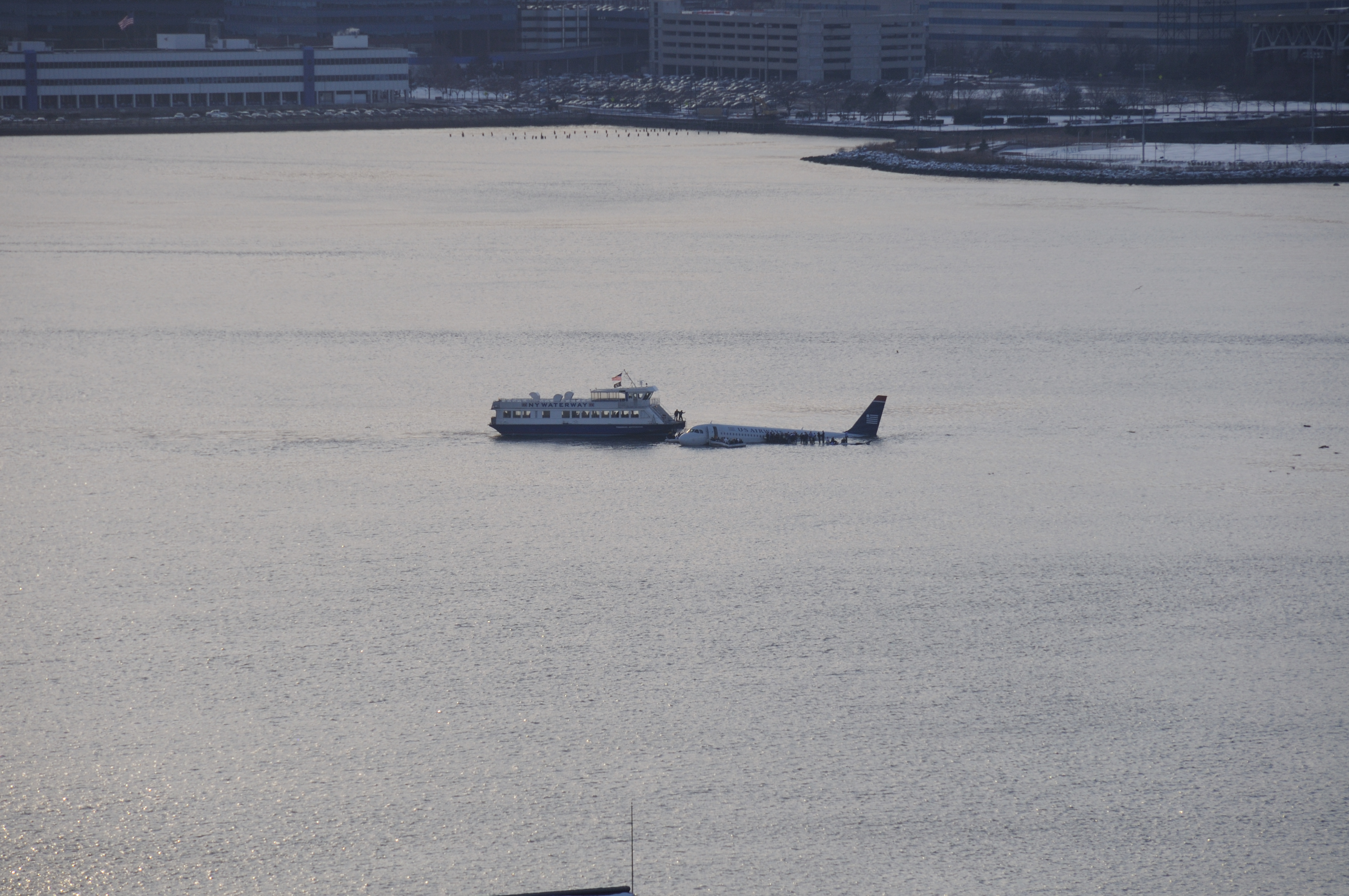
US Airways Flight 1549 and ferry in Hudson with Pier D in background

The Weehawken waterfront is located north of Weehawken Cove on a long narrow strip of land between the Hudson River and Hudson Palisades that, in the last centuries, has been transformed from an estuary flood zone once called Slough's Meadow to an extensive rail and shipping port. The site was redeveloped in the late 20th century into a residential and recreational area. The United Fruit Company once maintained the largest banana warehouse in the USA nearby, which has since been refurbished as commercial space. The Hudson River Waterfront Walkway is a partially-completed promenade along the bulkhead that was created as part of the redevelopment of the area.

In 2009, the site was used by emergency services in the rescuing of passengers for US Airways Flight 1549, which made an emergency landing on the Hudson River.

== See also ==
- Bergen Hill
- Bergenline Avenue (HBLR station)
- Timeline of Jersey City area railroads
- List of ferries across the Hudson River in New York City
- List of historical passenger rail services serving New York City
- List of Public Service Railway lines
- New York Central Railroad 69th Street Transfer Bridge
- New York Central Tugboat 13
