= Transfer Station (Hudson County) =

Populated place in Hudson County, New Jersey, US

Coordinates: 40°45′29″N 74°2′38″W

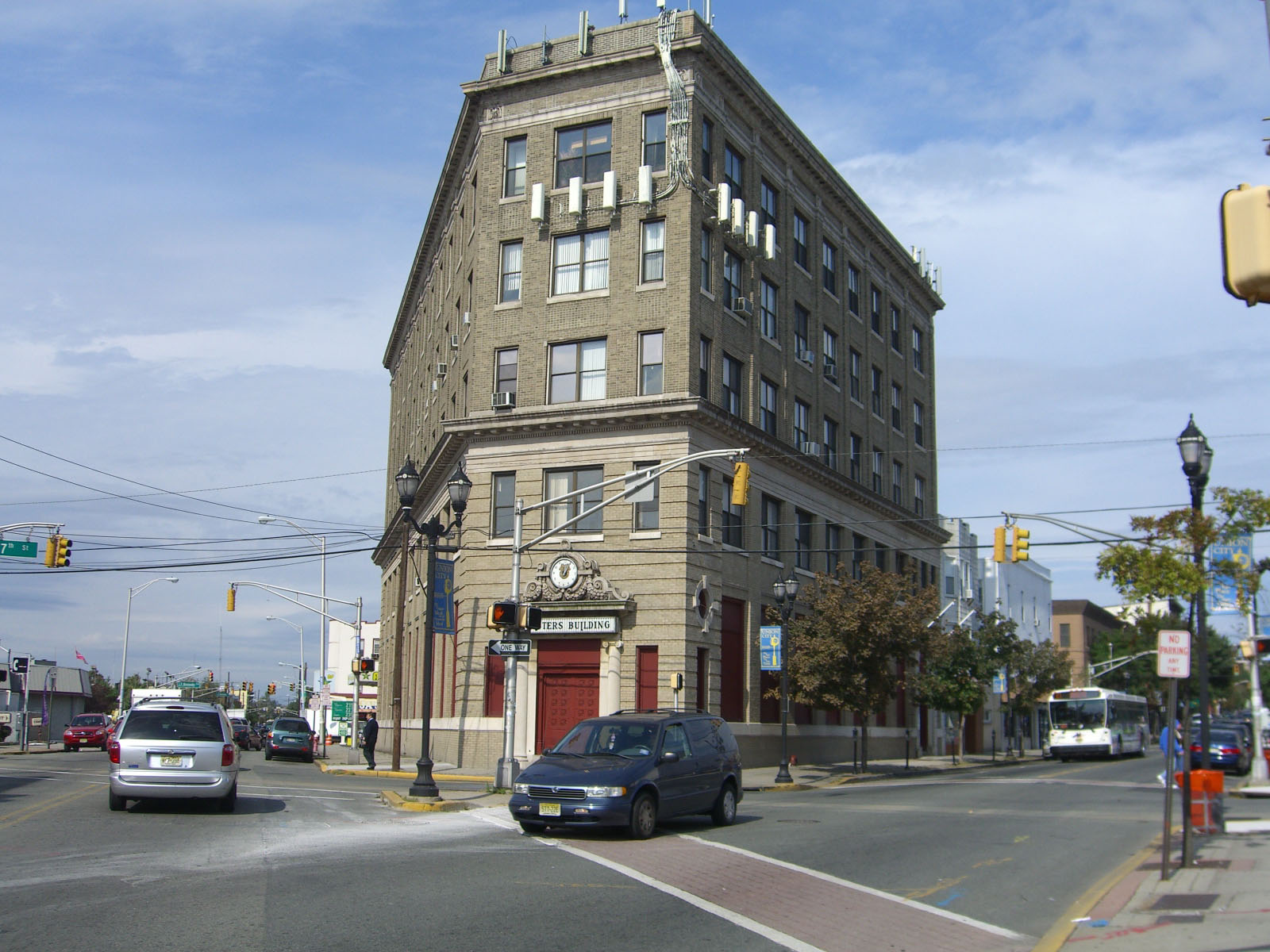
Building at site of former streetcar interchange at Transfer Station

Transfer Station is the name of a section of Hudson County, New Jersey, which radiates from the intersection where Paterson Plank Road crosses Summit Avenue at 7th Street. It is near the tripoint where the borders of Jersey City Heights, North Bergen, and Union City intersect, which is a few blocks to the southwest of the station, at the intersection of Secaucus Road and Kennedy Boulevard.

The section lies west of Washington Park, a Hudson county park, along the shared city line of Jersey City and Union City running diagonal across the urban grid. It lies just to the northeast of Chelsea in Jersey City. Here Kennedy Boulevard curves eastward following the contour of the Hudson Palisades. Secaucus Road, which creates part of the city line, begins in the district, and descends the Western Slope where North Bergen begins.

The area takes its name from the fact that it was once a transfer point for buses three trolley lines. The neighborhood was also the site, in 1912, of the first lunch wagon built by Jerry and Daniel O'Mahoney and John Hanf, which was bought for $800 and operated by restaurant entrepreneur Michael Griffin, who chose the location for its copious foot traffic. The wagon helped spark New Jersey's golden age of diner manufacturing, which in turn made the state the diner capital of the world. In the decades that followed, nearly all major U.S. diner manufacturers, including Jerry O'Mahoney Inc., started in New Jersey. During World War II, the area was a 24-hour hotspot for U.S. servicemen, who patronized the dozens of nightclubs located there.

== Transportation ==
New Jersey Transit bus routes 82, 83, 85, and 88 serve the district.
