= A-P-A Transport Corp. =

Defunct American trucking and shipping company

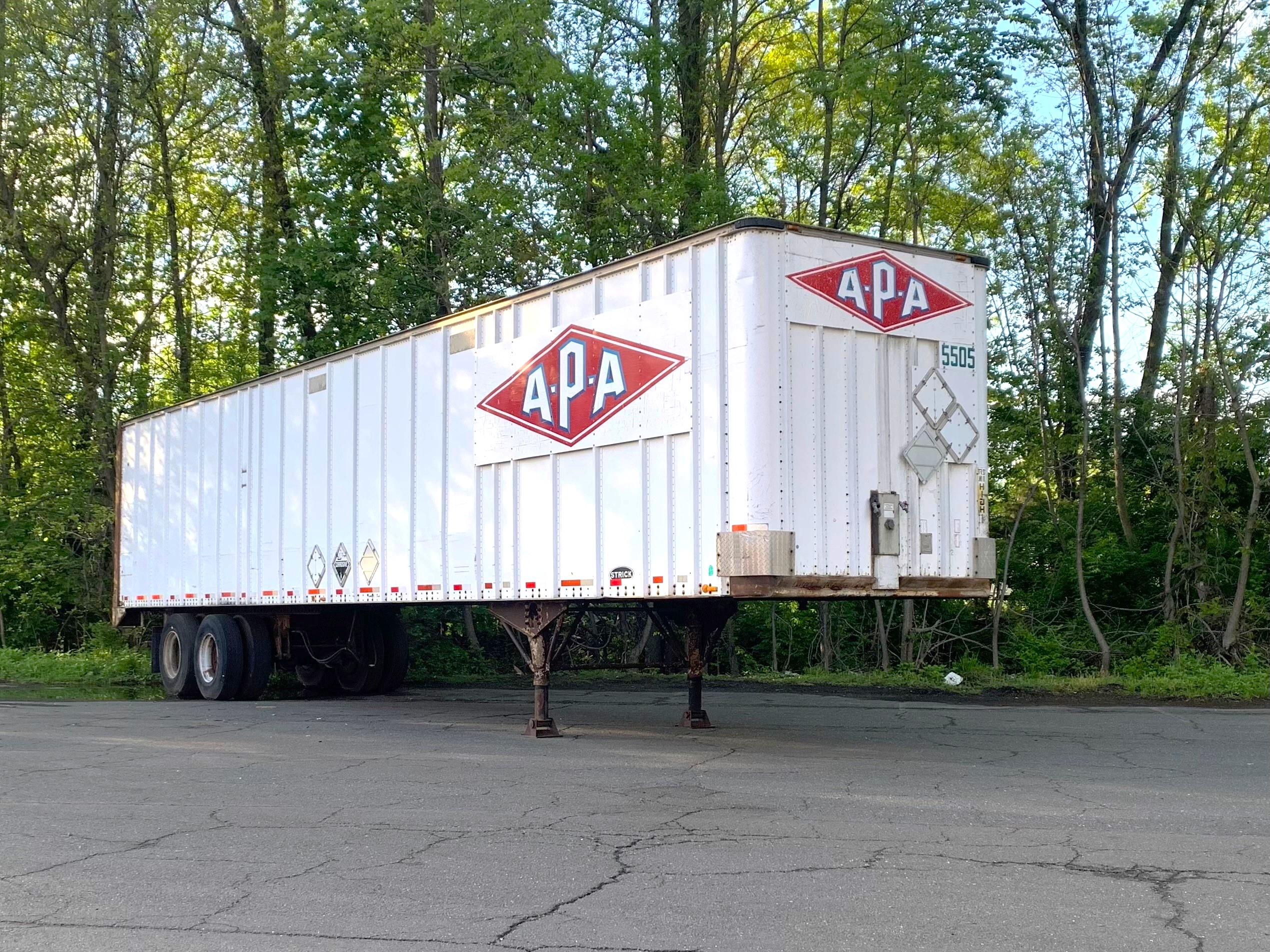

A-P-A Transport Corp. (also known as APA Transport) was a North Bergen, New Jersey–based trucking and shipping company. At one point it was the nation's fourth largest interstate freight trucking company.

== Origins ==
Founded in 1947 by Arthur Imperatore Sr. and his brothers Eugene, Arnold, George and Harold in West New York, New Jersey, it started as a local trucking business with a single surplus US Army truck, originally called "Imperatore Bros. Moving and Trucking." Later that same year they bought a second surplus truck, and then the name and two trucks of A&P Trucking Corp. for $800 from Albert Amorino, also of West New York. In the 1950s, after a few years of legal wrangling over the name by the A&P grocery chain, they simply added a trailing A.

== Successful ==
In 1952 they built a new terminus at 88th Street and Tonnelle Ave in North Bergen and by 1958 the company surpassed $1 million in gross revenue. Eventually Arthur bought out all the other brothers in the business. The company enjoyed great success, growing to more than 3,500 tractor-trailers and operating 31 freight terminals by 1991.

=== Shutdown ===
By 2001 it had fallen to 38th place, and finally closed its doors in February 2002.
