= Arthur Imperatore Sr. =

American businessman (1925–2020)

- Born: July 8, 1925; West New York, New Jersey, US
- Died: November 18, 2020 (aged 95); New York City, New York, US
- Occupation: Businessman
- Known for: Founder of NY Waterway ferry service and A-P-A Trucking, former owner of the Colorado Rockies hockey team

Arthur Edward Imperatore Sr. (July 8, 1925 – November 18, 2020) was an American businessman and sports owner from New Jersey. He was best known as being the founder and president of the NY Waterway, a ferry service. After serving in the United States Army Air Corps in World War II Imperatore founded, with his brothers, A-P-A Transport Corp. He purchased the Colorado Rockies hockey team in 1978 and sold it in 1981. That same year he purchased waterfront land at Weehawken, New Jersey, with the intention of constructing a residential development. Imperatore set up a passenger ferry service to support this development and that grew into NY Waterway which ran 36 ferries.

== Early life ==
Imperatore was born in West New York, New Jersey, on July 8, 1925. He was the 9th of 10 children of Italian-Americans Eugene and Teresa Imperatore, who owned a grocery store. As a child Imperatore often travelled on the Hudson River ferries to get to the Yankee Stadium, though he would try to avoid paying the fare. He served in the United States Army Air Corps during World War II as a navigator on B-24 and B-29 bomber aircraft.

== Career ==
In 1947 he started a local trucking business with his brothers Eugene, Arnold, George, and Harold using a surplus U.S. Army truck, which eventually became A-P-A Transport Corp., the nation's fourth largest interstate freight trucking company. The company grew to become the fourth-largest freight trucking firm in the United States, before finally shutting down its operations in February 2002.

Imperatore purchased the Colorado Rockies ice hockey team from Denver-based oilman Jack Vickers on July 12, 1978, with the intention of keeping the franchise in Denver before moving it east to the new arena at the Meadowlands Sports Complex which was under construction and expected to be completed by 1980. His imposition of the team's eventual transfer alienated many fans. Before he could complete the move to northern New Jersey, Imperatore sold the Rockies to Buffalo-based cable television magnate Peter Gilbert in a transaction that was unanimously approved by the NHL Board of Governors on February 10, 1981.

In 1981 Imperatore purchased a 2.5-mile (4.0 km) length of waterfront in Weehawken and West New York from the bankrupt Penn Central railroad for $7.5 million. The site consisted of abandoned and dilapidated rail yards and Imperatore planned to convert it into a residential development. However, to attract residents he needed to make it commutable to the city, which was hampered by congested bridges and tunnels. In 1986 Imperatore started the NY Waterway ferry service between Weehawken and Manhattan. There were as few as five passengers on the first trip and the ferry was derided as "Arthur's Folly". However, its popularity grew and the company eventually managed 36 ferries and 80 buses, carrying 32,000 passengers a day. The service enabled development of Weehawken and many other riverside areas.

In 1989 Imperatore started an upscale restaurant, Arthur's Landing, in Weehawken along the Hudson River. It was closed in 2009, and another restaurant opened in the space by 2013. At one point Imperatore planned to build a semblance of Venice on the New Jersey Hudson River waterfront.

== Personal life ==
Imperatore was a resident of Fort Lee, New Jersey, living in a home that had been built by gangster Albert Anastasia and was later owned successively by real estate developer Del Webb and comedian Buddy Hackett. He was married to Mei-Ling Yee-Imperatore, and he had a son and daughter as well as four step children. Imperatore entered the Forbes 400 list of richest Americans in 1988, his only year on the list. He died on November 18, 2020, following a long illness.

== Honors ==
The Arthur E. Imperatore School of Sciences and Arts of Stevens Institute of Technology, in Hoboken, New Jersey, was named in his honor. Imperatore was inducted into the New Jersey Hall of Fame in 2017.

== See also ==
- List of Italian American business people
- Odonyms in Hudson County, New Jersey
