= Weehawken Public Library =

Public library in New Jersey

Coordinates: 40.76911°N 74.02329°W

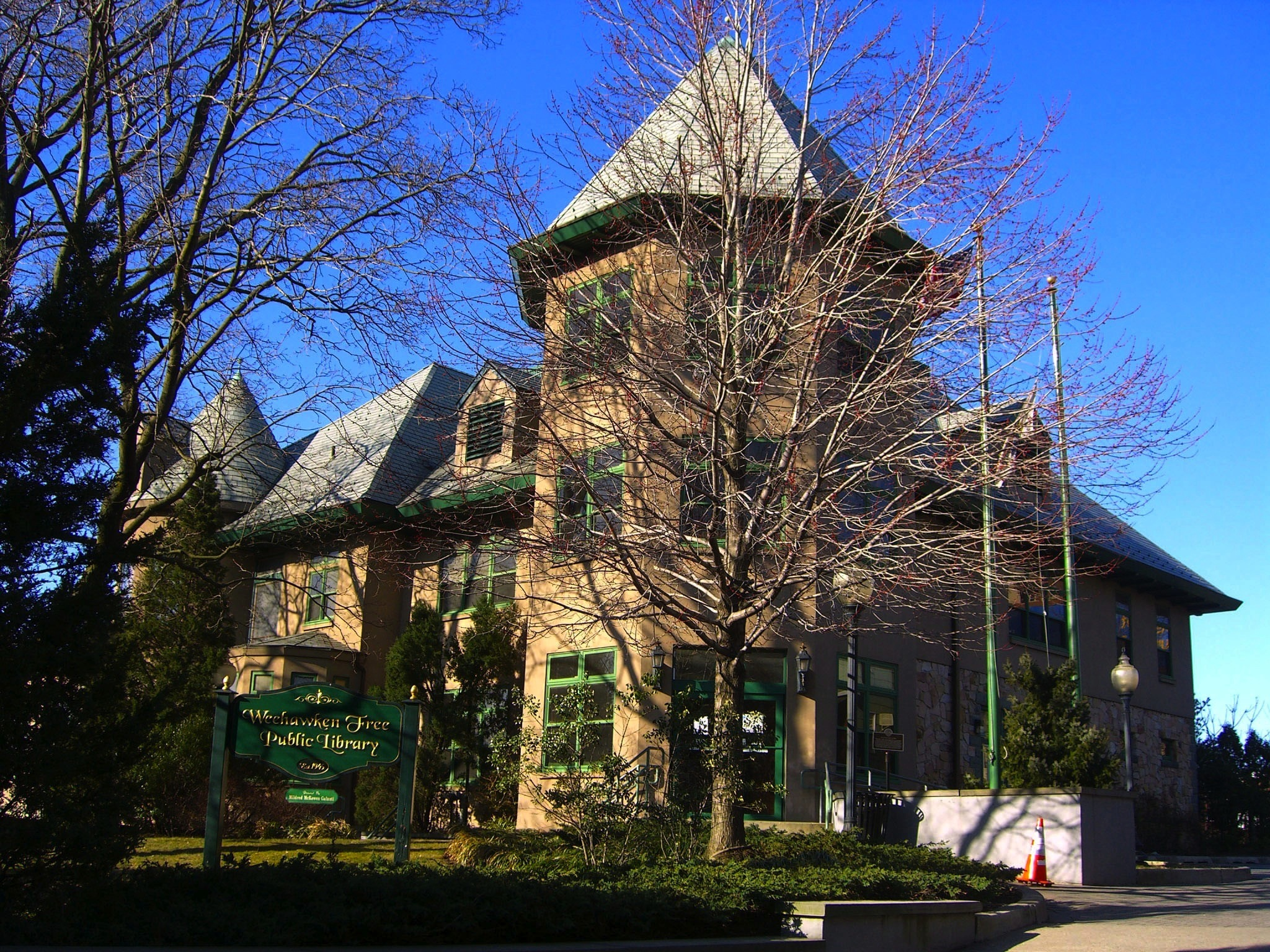
Entrance to the library on Hauxhurst Avenue

The Weehawken Public Library is the free public library of Weehawken, New Jersey. The library has a collection of about 43,000 volumes and circulates 40,604 items annually. It is a member of Bridging Communities, Connecting Library Services, a consortium of municipal libraries in the northeastern New Jersey counties of Bergen, Hudson, Passaic, and Essex.

The library sits at 49 Hauxhurst Avenue on a precipice overlooking the Lincoln Tunnel Helix. Originally built as a private home, it became a library in 1942, and was extensively renovated and expanded in 1997-1998. The landmark is home to the town's historical commission. An annual fundraiser for the library at Lincoln Harbor, a culinary event called A Taste of Weehawken, has taken place since 2000.

== History ==
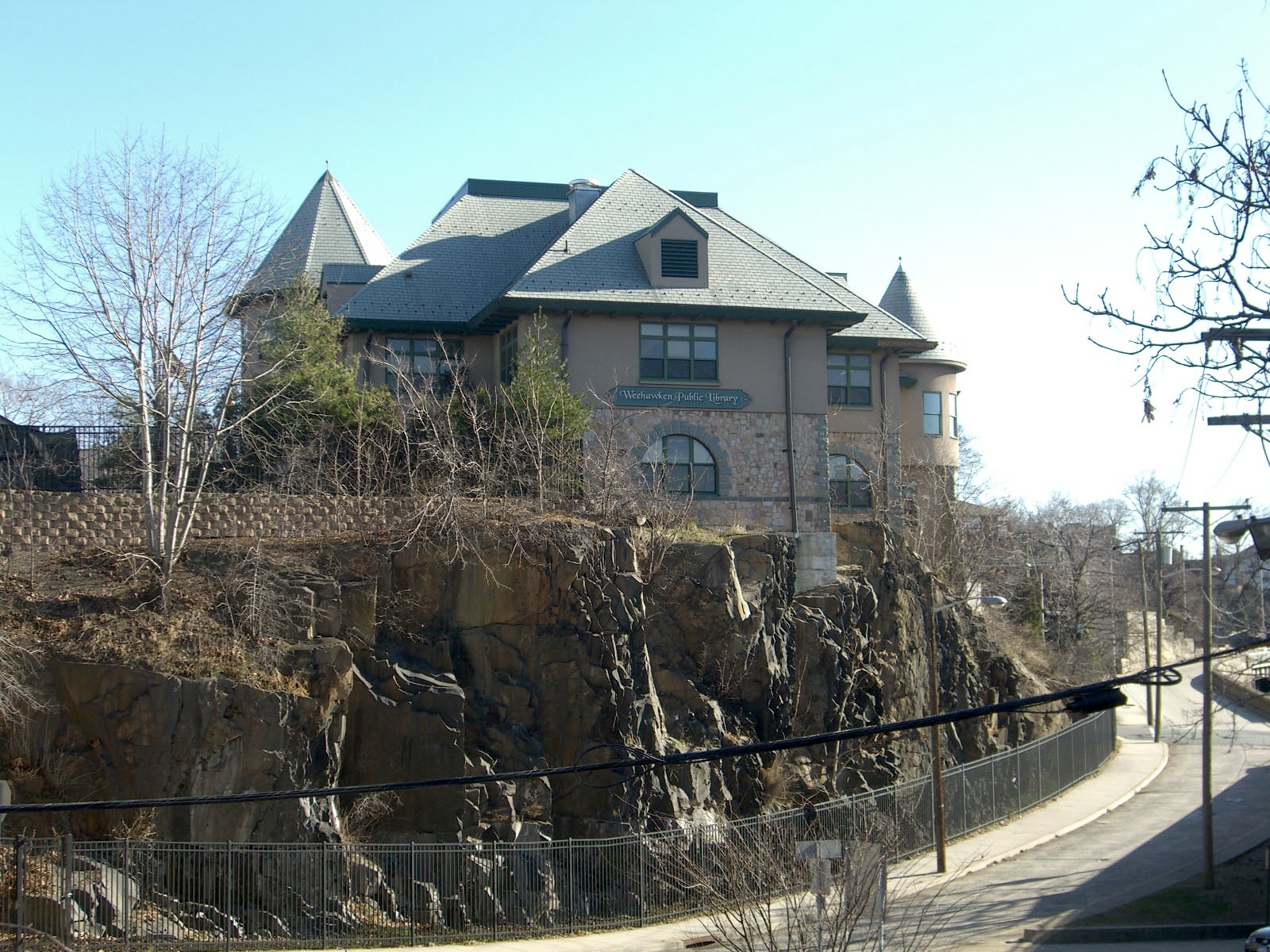
The library overlooks the Lincoln Tunnel Helix.

Wilhelm Joseph Peter (aka William Peter) (March 16, 1832 – June 10, 1918) immigrated from Achern in the Grand Duchy of Baden after the German revolution of 1848 to avoid persecution due to his father's affiliation with it. After some years in the brewery business at several locales in North Hudson, he established the William Peter Brewing Company in 1862 at Hudson Avenue and Weehawken Street in what was then Union Hill. Parts of the imposing structure remained, and were repurposed as a storage facility. While he and his family lived for a time across the street at the since demolished Fausel Mansion, Peter eventually built a mansion across the valley on the cliff where the library now stands.

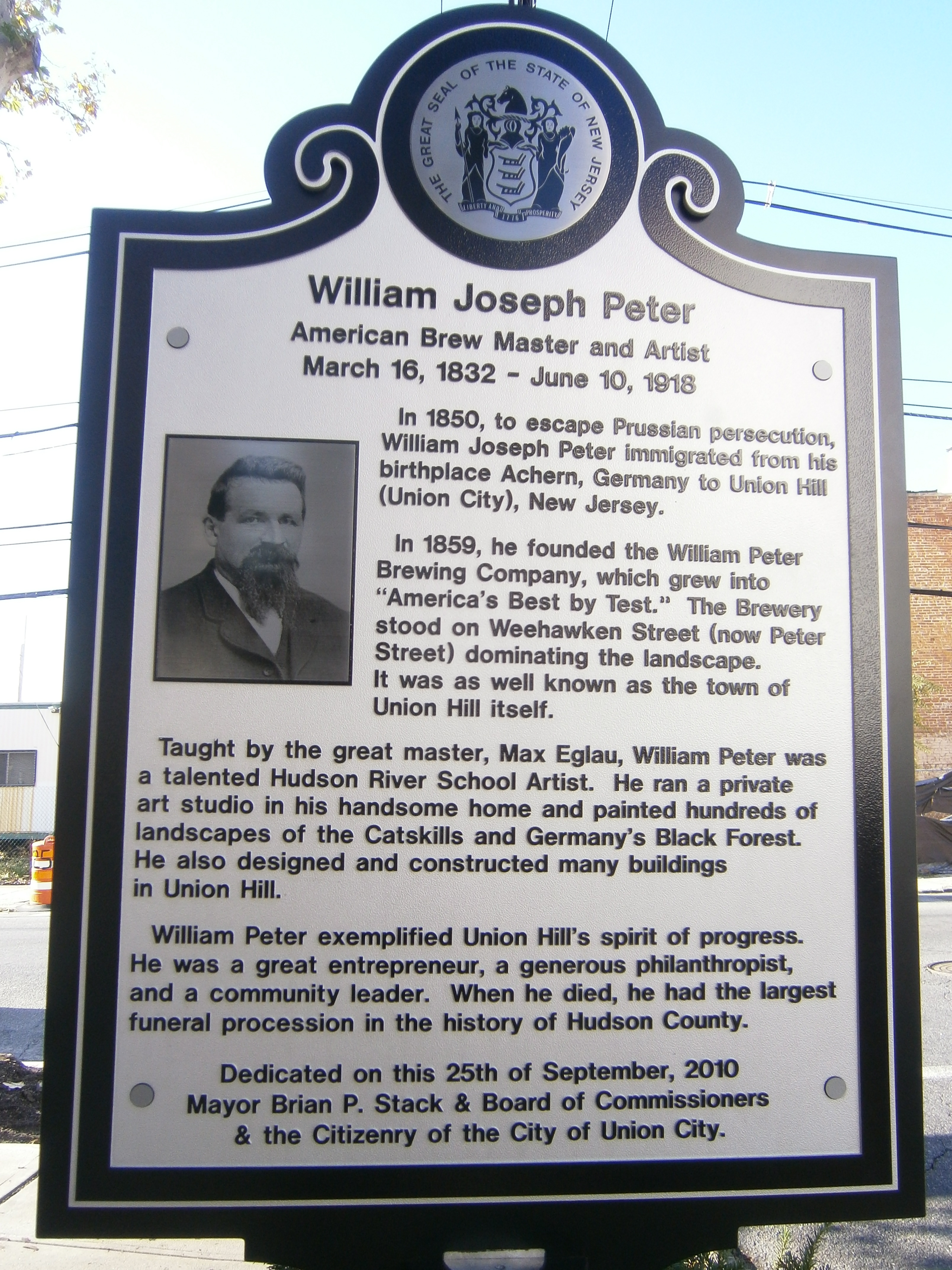
The William Peter historical marker on Hudson Ave and Peter Street in Union City

Completed in 1904 at the cost of $75,000, the home was designed like a German-style castle with 17 rooms and elaborately decorated with ornate woodwork, marble, stained glass, and several fireplaces. A successful businessman, Peter was also a painter encouraged by Hudson River School artist Max Eaglau and maintained a studio as his home for himself and others to use. The gallery in the house included many works inspired by his native Black Forest and the Catskill Mountains, where he summered. After Peter's death, the house changed hands and was owned for a time by the Arnoldi family. In the 1930s, to make way for the construction of the Midtown-Hudson Tunnel (today's Lincoln Tunnel), the building and others in the neighborhood and along Boulevard East were acquired by the Port Authority. Many were demolished, but the Peter Mansion was spared and later given to the township. The library opened in September 1942 with books and memorabilia donated by local residents.

In 1997, the library closed for expansion and renovation. It re-opened in 1999. In March 2022, the town council adopted a $1.4 million bond ordinance to modernize the library. The project includes installation of energy efficient lighting, replacement of exterior windows, improved Wi-Fi, a new HVAC system, an improved electrical system, and additional USB ports to public work stations.

== Weehawken Historical Commission ==
The Weehawken Historical Commission maintains materials originally contributed upon the creation of the library as well as other acquisitions made over the years. The Weehawken Time Machine is a website that has digitized many of the photographs and documents in the collection. In 2009, to celebrate the 150th anniversary of the town's incorporation, members of the commission published Weehawken as part of Arcadia Publishing's Images of America series.
