= Weehawken, New Jersey =

Township in Hudson County, New Jersey, US

- Township
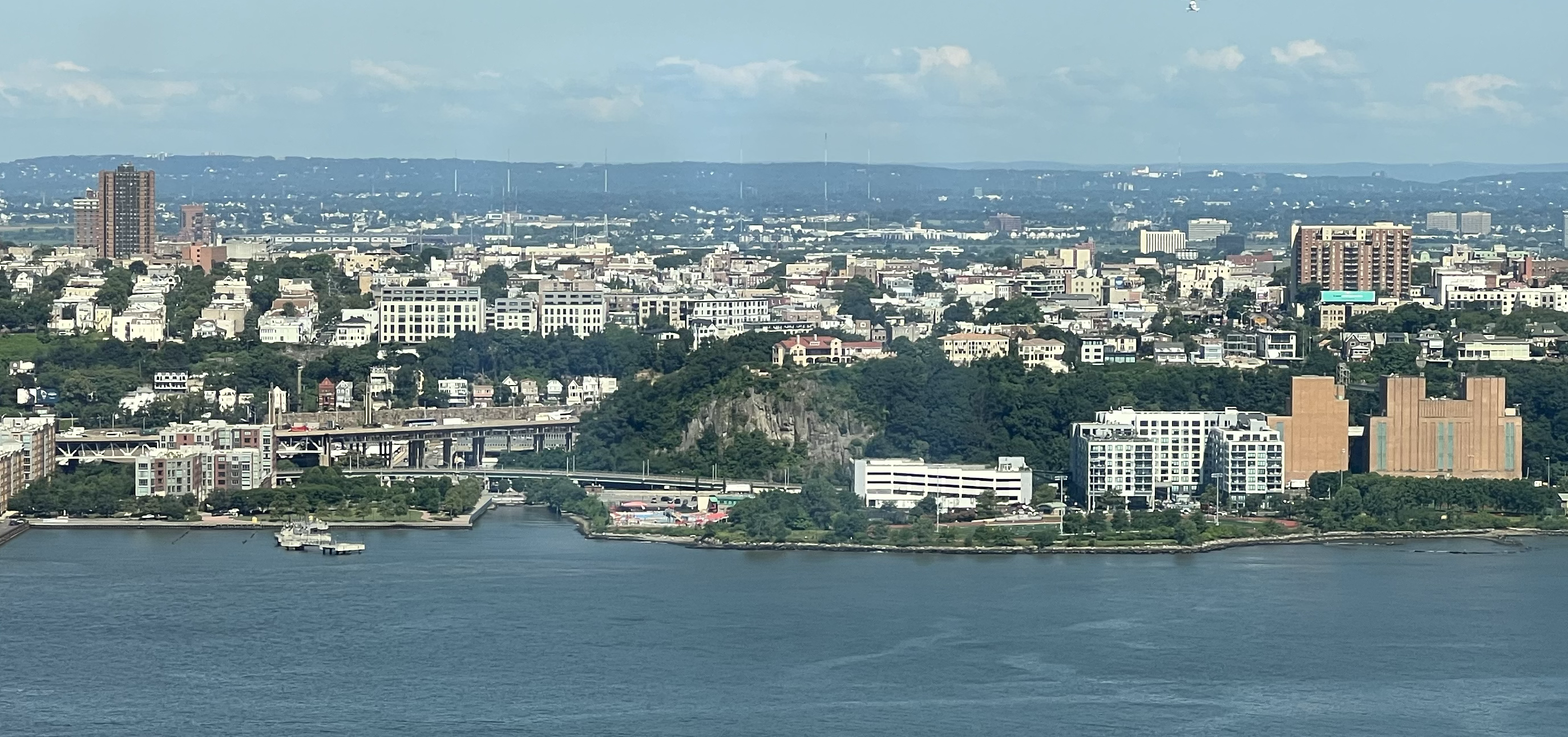
- Weehawken and the Hudson River seen from Manhattan in July 2025
- Interactive map of Weehawken, New Jersey
- Location in Hudson County Location in New Jersey Location in the United States
- Coordinates: 40°46′17″N 74°01′10″W
- Country: United States
- State: New Jersey
- County: Hudson
- Incorporated: March 15, 1859

Government
  - Type: Faulkner Act (council–manager)
  - Body: Township Council
  - Mayor: Richard F. Turner (term ends June 30, 2026)
  - Manager: Giovanni D. Ahmad
  - Municipal clerk: Rola Fares

Area
  - Total: 1.47 sq mi (3.82 km^{2})
  - Land: 0.78 sq mi (2.03 km^{2})
  - Water: 0.69 sq mi (1.79 km^{2}) 46.69%
  - Rank: 454th of 565 in state 7th of 12 in county
- Elevation: 3 ft (0.91 m)

Population (2020)
  - Total: 17,197
  - Estimate (2023): 17,207
  - Rank: 154th of 565 in state 10th of 12 in county
  - Density: 21,934.9/sq mi (8,469.1/km^{2})
  - Rank: 8th of 565 in state 6th of 12 in county
- Time zone: UTC−05:00 (Eastern (EST))
  - Summer (DST): UTC−04:00 (Eastern (EDT))
- ZIP Codes: 07086–07087
- Area codes: 201/551
- FIPS code: 3401777930
- GNIS feature ID: 0882224
- Website: www.weehawken-nj.us

Weehawken is a township in the northern part of Hudson County, in the U.S. state of New Jersey. It is located on the Hudson Waterfront and Hudson Palisades overlooking the Hudson River. As of the 2020 United States census, the township's population was 17,197, an increase of 4,643 (+37.0%) from the 2010 census count of 12,554, which in turn reflected a decline of 947 (−7.0%) from the 13,501 counted in the 2000 census.

== History ==
=== Name ===
The name Weehawken is generally considered to have evolved from the Algonquian language Lenape spoken by the Hackensack and Tappan. It has variously been interpreted as "maize land", "place of gulls", "rocks that look like trees", which would refer to the Palisades, atop which most of the town sits, or "at the end", among other suggested translations.

Three U.S. Navy ships have been named for the city. The USS Weehawken, launched on November 5, 1862, was a Passaic-class monitor, or ironclad ship, which sailed for the Union Navy during the American Civil War, encountered battles at the Charleston, South Carolina, coast and sank in a moderate gale on December 6, 1863. The Weehawken was the last ferry to the West Shore Terminal on March 25, 1959, at 1:10 am, ending 259 years of continuous ferry service. Weehawken Street in Manhattan's Greenwich Village was the site of a colonial Hudson River ferry landing.

The name and the place have inspired mention in multiple works of popular culture.

=== Founding ===
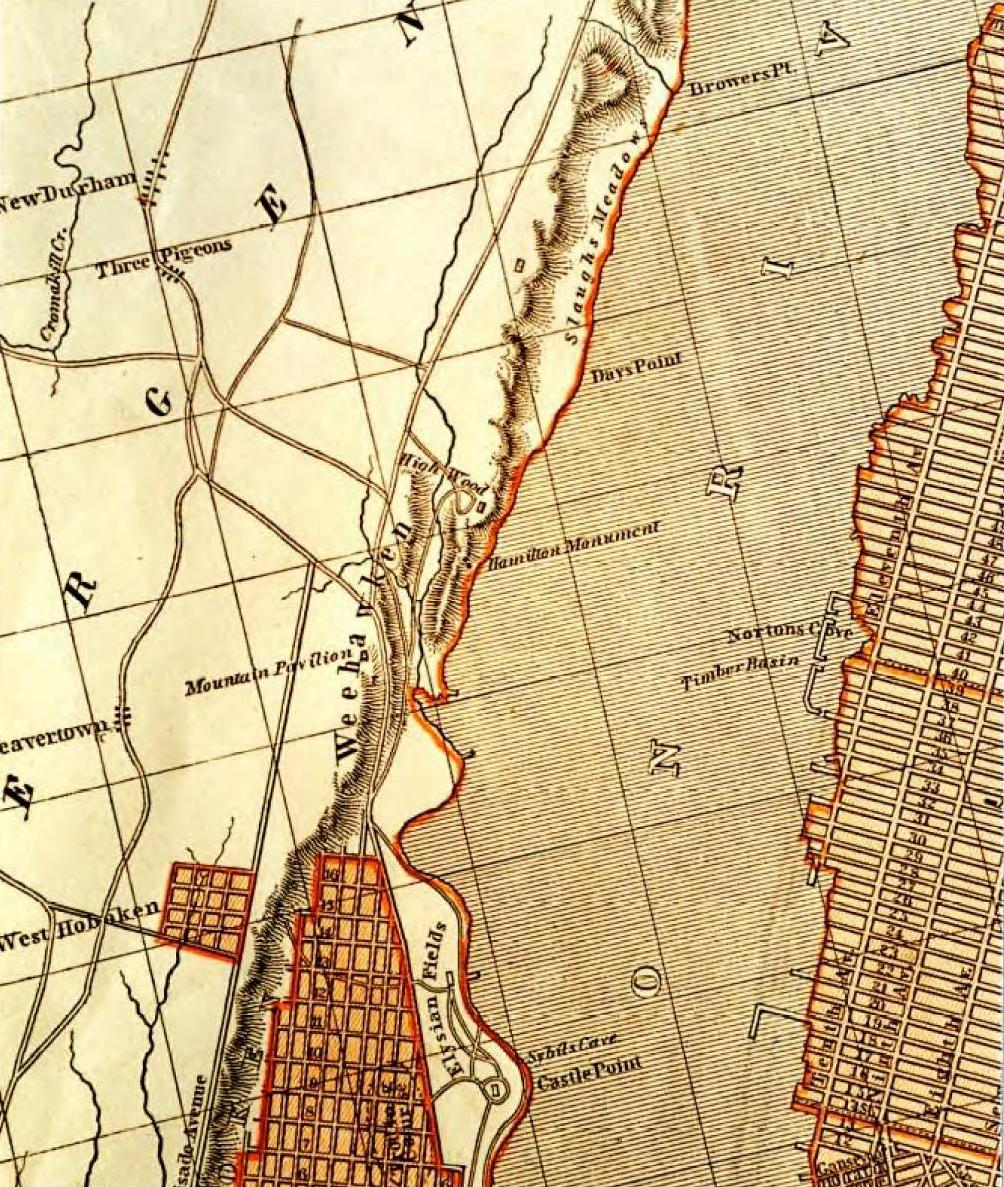
An 1841 map of parts of Hudson and New York counties and the Hudson River

The township's written history began in 1609, when Henry Hudson, on his third voyage to the New World, sailed down what was later named the North River on the Half Moon and anchored in Weehawken Cove. At the time it was the territory of the Hackensack and Tappan, of the Turtle Clan, or Unami, a branch of the Lenape. They were displaced by immigrants to the province of New Netherland, who had begun to settle the west bank of the Hudson at Pavonia in 1630. On May 11, 1647, Maryn Adriansen received a patent for a plantation (of 169 acres) at Awiehaken. In 1658, Director-General of New Netherland Peter Stuyvesant negotiated a deal with the Lenape to purchase all the land from "the great rock above Wiehacken", west to Sikakes (Secaucus) and south to Konstapels Hoeck (Constable Hook). In 1661, Weehawken and all of present-day Hudson County became part of Bergen Township, New Jersey when it (and most of northeastern New Jersey) came under the jurisdiction of the court at Bergen Square.

In 1674, New Netherland was ceded to the Netherlands by the British and the town became part of the Province of East Jersey. In 1677, John Luby acquired several parcels covering 35 acres (14 ha) along the Hudson. Most habitation was along the top of the cliffs since the low-lying areas were mostly marshland. Descriptions from the period speak of the dense foliage and forests and excellent land for growing vegetables and orchard fruits. As early as 1700 there was regular, if sporadic ferry service from Weehawken. In 1752, King George II made the first official grant for ferry service, the ferry house north of Hoboken primarily used for farm produce and likely was sold at the Greenwich Village landing that became Weehawken Street.

Weehawken was formed as a township by an act of the New Jersey Legislature, on March 15, 1859, from portions of Hoboken and North Bergen. A portion of the township was ceded to Hoboken in 1874. Additional territory was annexed in 1879 from West Hoboken.

=== Revolutionary War ===
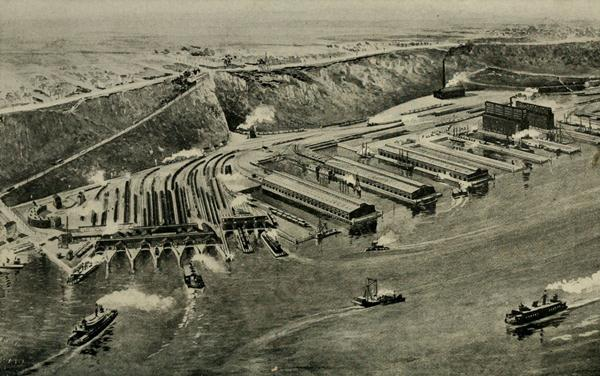
Ferries departing the West Shore Railroad's Weehawken Terminal in the late 19th century

During the American Revolutionary War, Weehawken was used as a lookout for the patriots to check on the British, who were situated in New York and controlled the surrounding waterways. In fact, in July 1778, Lord Stirling asked Aaron Burr, in a letter written on behalf of General George Washington, to employ several persons to "go to Bergen Heights, Weehawk, Hoebuck, or any other heights thereabout to observe the motions of the enemy's shipping" and to gather any other possible intelligence. Early documented inhabitants included a Captain James Deas, whose stately residence at Deas' Point was located atop a knoll along the river. Lafayette had used the mansion as his headquarters and later Washington Irving came to gaze at Manhattan.

Not far from Deas' was a ledge 11 paces wide and 20 paces long, situated 20 feet (6.1 m) above the Hudson on the Palisades. This ledge, long gone, was the site of 18 documented duels and probably many unrecorded ones in the years 1798–1845. The most famous is the duel between Alexander Hamilton, first Secretary of the Treasury, and Aaron Burr, then Vice President of the United States, which took place on July 11, 1804; this duel was re-enacted on its 200th anniversary (July 11, 2004) by descendants of Hamilton and Burr. Three years earlier, a duel was held at this spot between Hamilton's son, Philip Hamilton, and George Eacker. (Another source, however, puts the duel in Paulus Hook in Jersey City.) Phillip, who had been defending his father's honor, suffered a fatal wound in his hip and his left arm and died two days later on November 24, 1801.

=== 19th century ===
In the mid-19th century, James G. King built his estate Highwood on the bluff that now bears his name and entertained many political and artistic figures of the era, including Daniel Webster.

With the ferry, the Hackensack Plank Road (a toll road that was a main artery from Weehawken to Hackensack), and later, the West Shore Railroad, built during the early 1870s, the waterfront became a transportation hub. The wealthy built homes along the top of the New Jersey Palisades, where they might flee from the sweltering heat of New York and breathe the fresh air of the heights. Weehawken became the playground of the rich during the middle to late 19th century. A series of wagon lifts, stairs and even a passenger elevator designed by the same engineer as those at the Eiffel Tower (which at the time was the world's largest) were put in place to accommodate the tourists and summer dwellers. The Eldorado Amusement Park, a pleasure garden which opened in 1891, drew massive crowds.

=== 20th century ===
The turn of the 20th century saw the end of the large estates, casinos, hotels, and theaters as tourism gave way to subdivisions (such as Highwood Park and Clifton Park) and the construction of many of the private homes in the township. This coincided with the influx of the Germans, Austrians, and Swiss, who built them and the breweries and embroidery factories in nearby Union City and West New York. While remaining essentially residential, Weehawken continued to grow as Hudson County became more industrial and more populated. Shortly after World War I, a significant contingent of Syrian immigrants from Homs (a major textile center in its own right) moved into Weehawken to take advantage of the burgeoning textile industry.

== Geography ==
Weehawken is part of the New York metropolitan area. Situated on the western shore of the Hudson River, along the southern end of the New Jersey Palisades across from Midtown Manhattan, it is the western terminus of the Lincoln Tunnel. Weehawken is one of the towns that comprise North Hudson, sometimes called NoHu in the artistic community.

According to the U.S. Census Bureau, the township had a total area of 1.48 square miles (3.82 km^{2}), including 0.78 square miles (2.03 km^{2}) of land and 0.69 square miles (1.79 km^{2}) of water (46.69%).

The township borders the municipalities of Hoboken, Union City and West New York in Hudson County; and the New York City borough of Manhattan, across the Hudson River.

While the Palisades defines Weehawken's natural topography, the Lincoln Tunnel Helix and Lincoln Tunnel toll plaza are prominent man-made structures. Geographically, Weehawken has distinct neighborhoods: Downtown (known as "The Shades"), the Heights, Uptown (which includes Kingswood Bluff, known as "The Bluff"), and the Waterfront, which since the 1990s has been developed for transportation, commercial, recreational and residential uses. Though some are long abandoned (e.g., Grauert Causeway), there are still several outdoor public staircases (e.g., Shippen Steps) throughout the town and more than 15 "dead-end" streets. At its southeastern corner is Weehawken Cove which, along with the rail tracks farther inland, defines Weehawken's border with Hoboken. Its northern boundary is shared with West New York. Traversing Weehawken is Boulevard East, a scenic thoroughfare offering a sweeping vista of the Hudson River and the Manhattan skyline. Local zoning laws prohibit the construction of high-rise buildings that would obstruct sight-lines from higher points in the township. In a 1999 decision that blocked the development of a pair of waterfront towers that would have stood 160 feet (49 m), a judge cited the panoramic vistas from Weehawken as "a world-class amenity that encourages people to live, work and locate businesses in the area". In 2021, the development company Roseland donated 14.5 acres (5.9 ha) of land on the Palisades cliff face to the town in order to preserve its beauty and its history.

== Demographics ==
Historical population
| Census | Pop. | Note | %± |
|---|---|---|---|
| 1860 | 280 | | — |
| 1870 | 597 | | 113.2% |
| 1880 | 1,102 | | 84.6% |
| 1890 | 1,943 | | 76.3% |
| 1900 | 5,325 | | 174.1% |
| 1910 | 11,228 | | 110.9% |
| 1920 | 14,485 | | 29.0% |
| 1930 | 14,807 | | 2.2% |
| 1940 | 14,363 | | −3.0% |
| 1950 | 14,830 | | 3.3% |
| 1960 | 13,504 | | −8.9% |
| 1970 | 13,383 | | −0.9% |
| 1980 | 13,168 | | −1.6% |
| 1990 | 12,385 | | −5.9% |
| 2000 | 13,501 | | 9.0% |
| 2010 | 12,554 | | −7.0% |
| 2020 | 17,197 | | 37.0% |
| 2024 (est.) | 17,877 | | 4.0% |
Population sources: 1860–1920 1860–1870 1870; 1880–1890 1890–1910; 1890–1900 1910–1930; 1940–2000 2000; 2010 2020

=== 2020 census ===
Weehawken township, Hudson County, New Jersey – Racial and ethnic composition Note: the US Census treats Hispanic/Latino as an ethnic category. This table excludes Latinos from the racial categories and assigns them to a separate category. Hispanics/Latinos may be of any race.
| Race / Ethnicity (NH = Non-Hispanic) | Pop 2000 | Pop 2010 | Pop 2020 | % 2000 | % 2010 | % 2020 |
|---|---|---|---|---|---|---|
| White alone (NH) | 6,766 | 5,850 | 7,537 | 50.11% | 48.57% | 43.83% |
| Black or African American alone (NH) | 312 | 412 | 685 | 2.31% | 3.46% | 3.98% |
| Native American or Alaska Native alone (NH) | 9 | 14 | 15 | 0.07% | 0.12% | 0.09% |
| Asian alone (NH) | 616 | 1,010 | 2,594 | 4.56% | 8.43% | 15.08% |
| Native Hawaiian or Pacific Islander alone (NH) | 10 | 1 | 7 | 0.07% | 0.01% | 0.04% |
| Other race alone (NH) | 51 | 36 | 132 | 0.38% | 0.30% | 0.77% |
| Mixed race or Multiracial (NH) | 250 | 176 | 562 | 1.85% | 1.45% | 3.27% |
| Hispanic or Latino (any race) | 5,487 | 5,055 | 5,665 | 40.64% | 40.27% | 32.94% |
| Total | 13,501 | 12,554 | 17,197 | 100.00% | 100.00% | 100.00% |

=== 2010 census ===
The 2010 United States census counted 12,554 people, 5,712 households, and 2,913 families in the township. The population density was 15,764.6 per square mile (6,086.7/km^{2}). There were 6,213 housing units at an average density of 7,801.9 per square mile (3,012.3/km^{2}). The racial makeup was 71.85% (9,020) White, 4.83% (606) Black or African American, 0.49% (61) Native American, 8.16% (1,024) Asian, 0.01% (1) Pacific Islander, 10.76% (1,351) from other races, and 3.91% (491) from two or more races. Hispanic or Latino of any race were 40.27% (5,055) of the population.

Of the 5,712 households, 20.4% had children under the age of 18; 34.9% were married couples living together; 11.4% had a female householder with no husband present and 49.0% were non-families. Of all households, 36.1% were made up of individuals and 8.5% had someone living alone who was 65 years of age or older. The average household size was 2.20 and the average family size was 2.93.

16.3% of the population were under the age of 18, 7.9% from 18 to 24, 39.1% from 25 to 44, 24.5% from 45 to 64, and 12.3% who were 65 years of age or older. The median age was 37.2 years. For every 100 females, the population had 95.2 males. For every 100 females ages 18 and older there were 93.0 males.

The Census Bureau's 2006–2010 American Community Survey showed that (in 2010 inflation-adjusted dollars) median household income was $62,435 (with a margin of error of +/− $6,887) and the median family income was $90,903 (+/− $17,797). Males had a median income of $53,912 (+/− $7,426) versus $50,129 (+/− $3,238) for females. The per capita income for the township was $45,206 (+/− $5,011). About 10.1% of families and 12.9% of the population were below the poverty line, including 15.2% of those under age 18 and 20.4% of those age 65 or over.

=== 2000 census ===
As of the 2000 census, there were 13,501 people, 5,975 households, and 3,059 families residing in the township. The population density was 15,891.3 inhabitants per square mile (6,135.7/km^{2}). There were 6,159 housing units at an average density of 7,249.4 per square mile (2,799.0/km^{2}). The racial makeup of the township was 73.05% White, 3.58% African American, 0.20% Native American, 4.67% Asian, 0.10% Pacific Islander, 13.94% from other races, and 4.47% from two or more races. Hispanic or Latino of any race were 40.64% of the population.

There were 5,975 households, out of which 20.1% had children under the age of 18 living with them, 35.1% were married couples living together, 11.7% had a female householder with no husband present, and 48.8% were non-families. 35.6% of all households were made up of individuals, and 8.2% had someone living alone who was 65 years of age or older. The average household size was 2.26 and the average family size was 3.02.

In the township, the population was spread out, with 16.6% under the age of 18, 8.9% from 18 to 24, 42.4% from 25 to 44, 19.9% from 45 to 64, and 12.2% who were 65 years of age or older. The median age was 35 years. For every 100 females, there were 95.1 males. For every 100 females age 18 and over, there were 92.9 males.

The median income for a household in the township was $50,196, and the median income for a family was $52,613. Males had a median income of $41,307 versus $36,063 for females. The per capita income for the township was $29,269. About 9.3% of families and 11.4% of the population were below the poverty line, including 18.0% of those under age 18 and 11.3% of those age 65 or over.

Weehawken, with a population density about equal to that of Jersey City, is among the most densely populated municipalities in the United States.

== Economy ==
Weehawken has a retail district along Park Avenue, which represents its boundary with Union City and large office and apartment/townhouse developments along the Hudson River. Weehawken is a mostly residential community, but has a business district at Lincoln Harbor between the Lincoln Tunnel and Weehawken Cove. UBS, Hartz Mountain Telx Technologies (colocation center) are among the corporations which maintain offices in the neighborhood, which also hosts a Sheraton Hotels and Resorts-branded hotel.

== Sports ==
Formula One announced plans in 2011 to host a street race on a circuit stretching 3.2 miles (5.1 km) in Weehawken and West New York called Grand Prix of America, that was planned to have its first event in June 2013. The three-day event was anticipated to attract 100,000 people and bring in approximately $100 million in economic activity. The 2013 race was dropped from the calendar, with Formula One President and CEO Bernie Ecclestone stating that the promoters were in breach of contract and that new proposals from other parties would be welcome. The race was repeatedly added then removed from future Formula One provisional calendars, and dropped completely from the provisional calendar by 2016.

== Points of interest ==
Though the panoramic view (from the Verrazzano–Narrows Bridge to George Washington Bridge) may be its most famous attraction, Weehawken is also home to other sites of historic, aesthetic and engineering importance:

- The city's main commercial thoroughfare is Park Avenue, which is populated mostly by locally owned stores, eateries and bars.
- Hamilton Park, on Boulevard East, is located at the site of the former Eldorado Amusement Resort.
- King's Bluff, a historic district at "the end of the Palisades", includes many of Weehawken's most expensive homes, in an eclectic array of architectural styles
- The Weehawken Water Tower on Park Avenue was built in 1883 as part of the Hackensack Water Company Complex and inspired by Palazzo Vecchio in Florence, Italy. The Tower is cited on the Federal Maritime Chart as the "Red Tower" and serves as a warning to ships traveling south along the Hudson that they are approaching New York Bay.
- The former North Hudson Hospital is located on Park Avenue.
- Hackensack Plank Road, an early colonial thoroughfare first laid out in 1718, climbs from Downtown to The Heights and further north, originally connecting Hoboken and Hackensack.
- The "Horseshoe" on Shippen Street is a cobbled double hairpin street leading to Hackensack Plank Road and Shippen Street Steps, at the bottom of which is located Weehawken's original town hall. It is the home of VFW Post 1923 and the Weehawken Historical Commission.
- The Lincoln Tunnel Helix is the eight-lane circular viaduct that leads into the Art Deco style Lincoln Tunnel Toll Plaza. Nearby are the ventilation towers at Lincoln Harbor.
- The Weehawken Public Library, which was built in 1904 as the home the son of William Peter Sr., wealthy brewer/beer baron of the William Peter Brewing Company, is located at 49 Hauxhurst Avenue. It opened as a library in 1942 and underwent renovations from 1997 to 1999.
- The Atrium, which is home to Hudson River Performing Arts Center-sponsored events.
- NY Waterway's Weehawken Port Imperial Ferry Terminal, a state-of-the-art facility opened in 2006, is located at the site of the United Fruit Company, which was the largest banana import facility in the nation from the time of its opening in 1952.
- Reservoir Park, located at 20th to 22nd Streets on Palisade Avenue, opened on September 25, 2015, The passive park was created on the 14.4-acre (5.8 ha) site of a reservoir that had been owned by United Water but hadn't been used since 1996.
- The West Shore Railroad Tunnel, carved through the cliffs, is now used for the Hudson–Bergen Light Rail.
- The Hudson Riverfront 9/11 Memorial on the Hudson River Walkway near the foot of Pershing Road consists of two trident-shaped beams that served as supports for the twin towers of the World Trade Center.
- The Weehawken Pool, part of the Weehawken Waterfront Park and Recreation Center, which opened in August 2021.
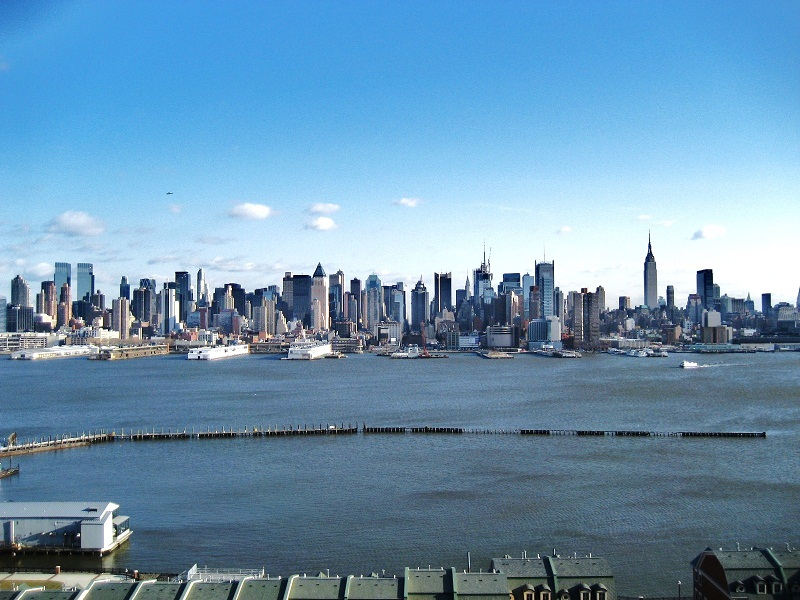
View from Hamilton Park

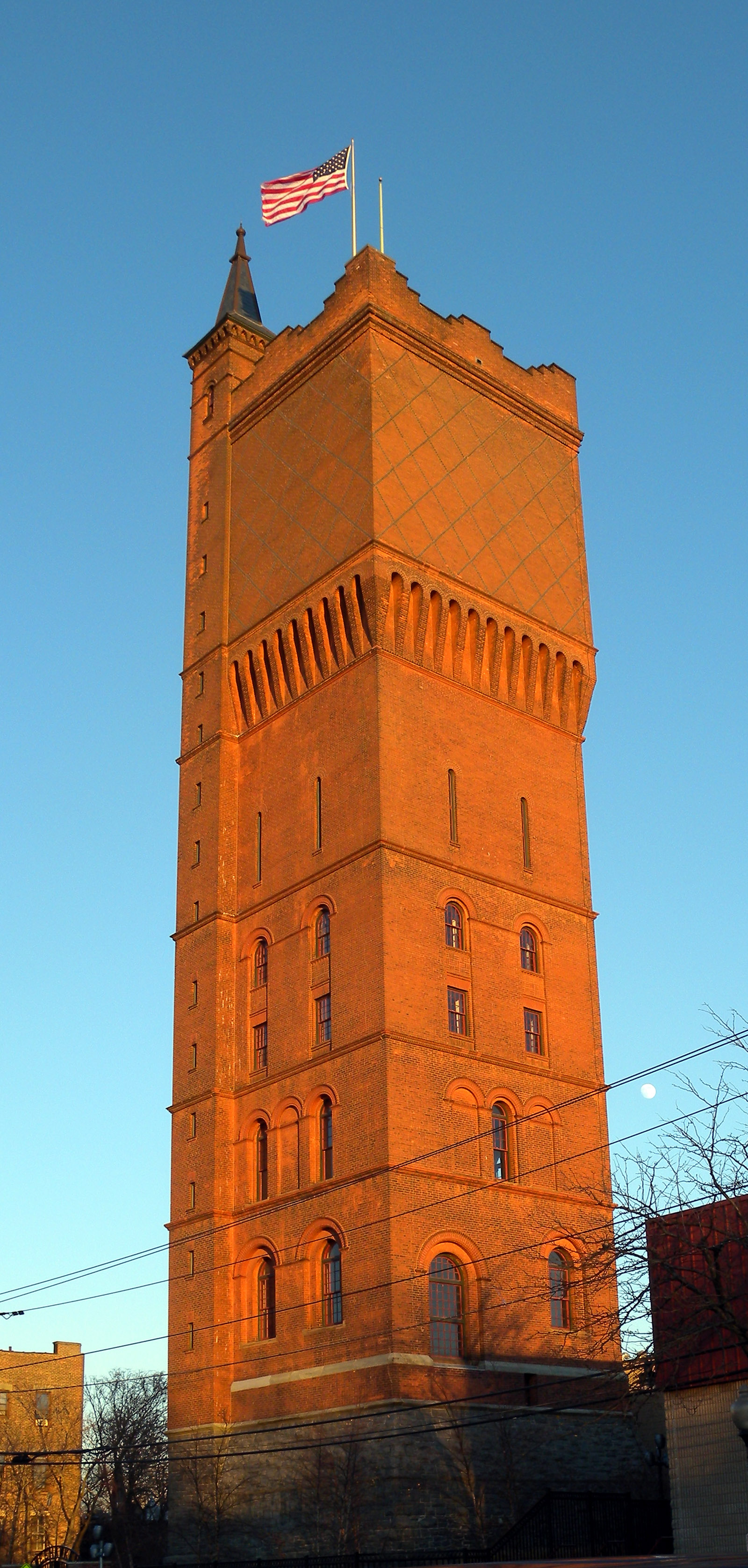
Water Tower

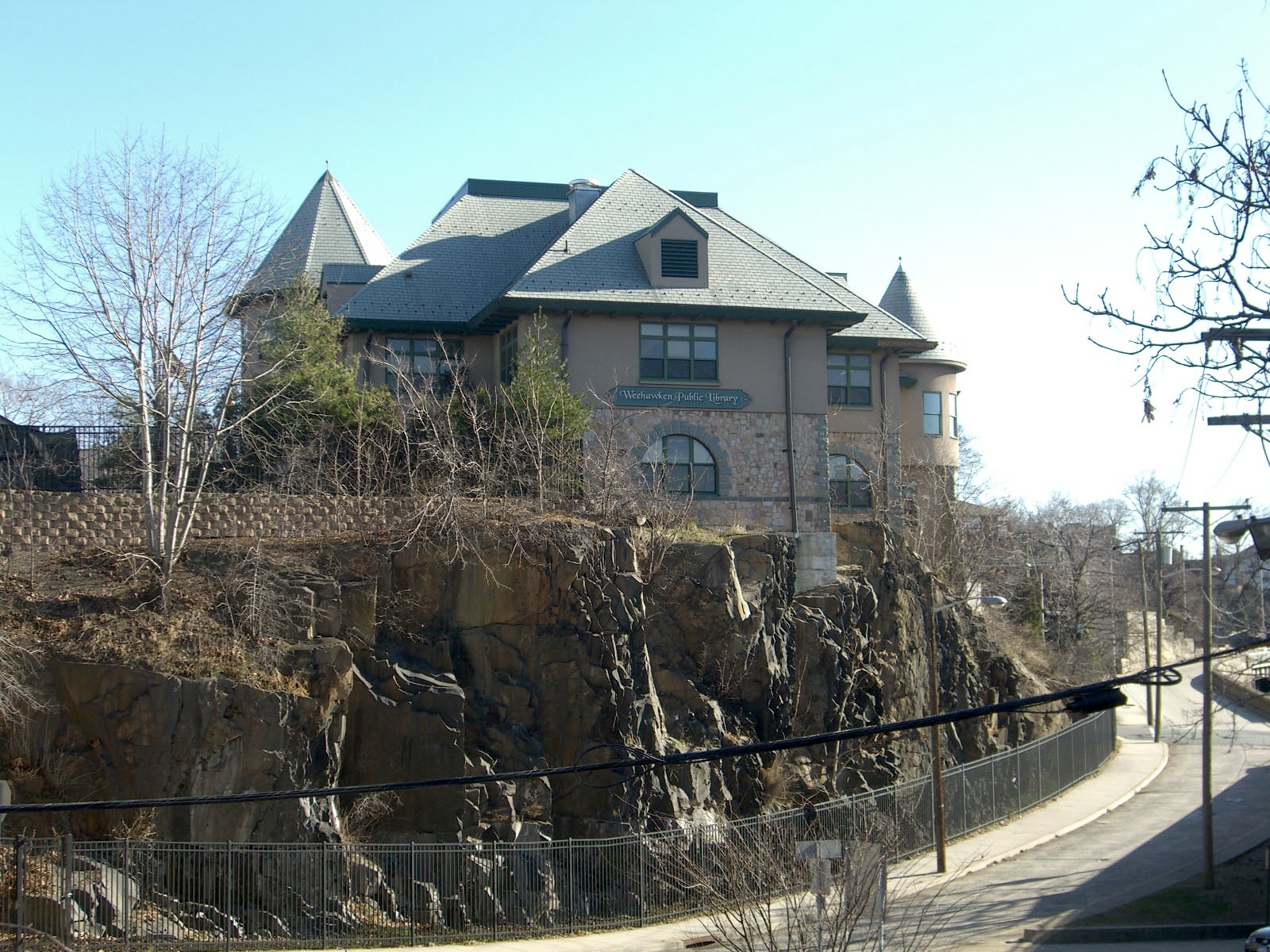
Public Library

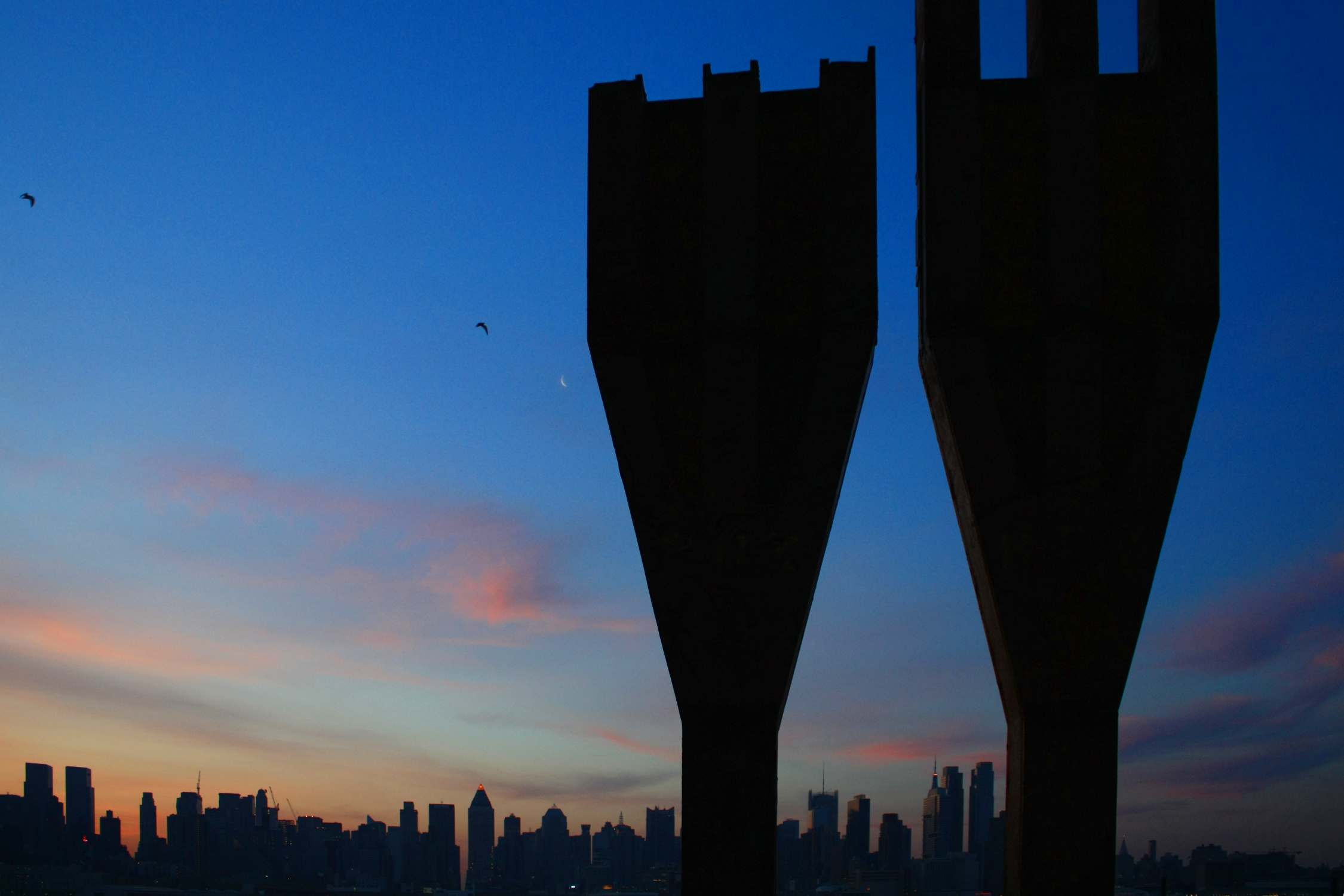
9/11 Memorial

=== Hamilton Monument ===
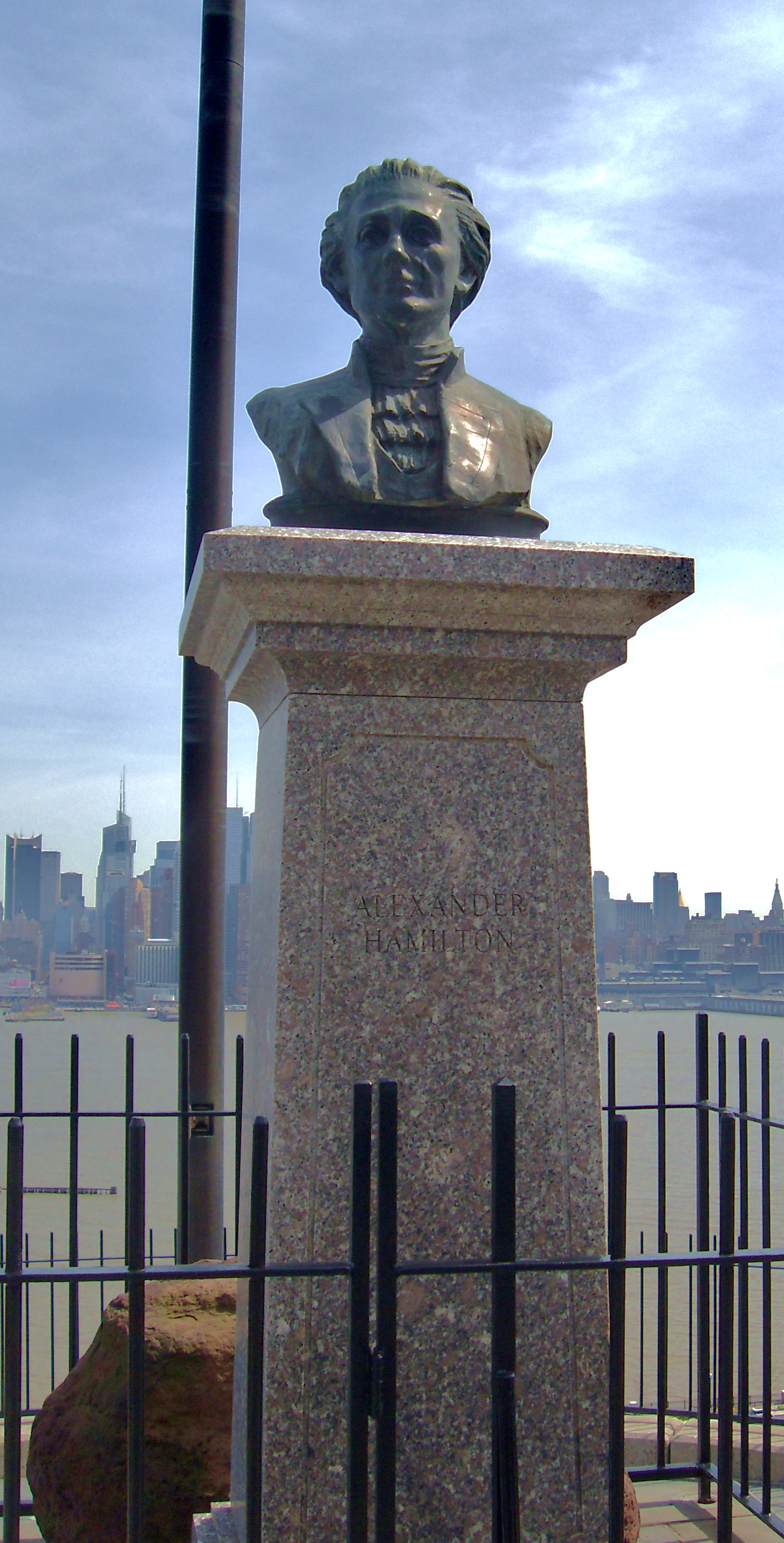
1935 bust of Alexander Hamilton

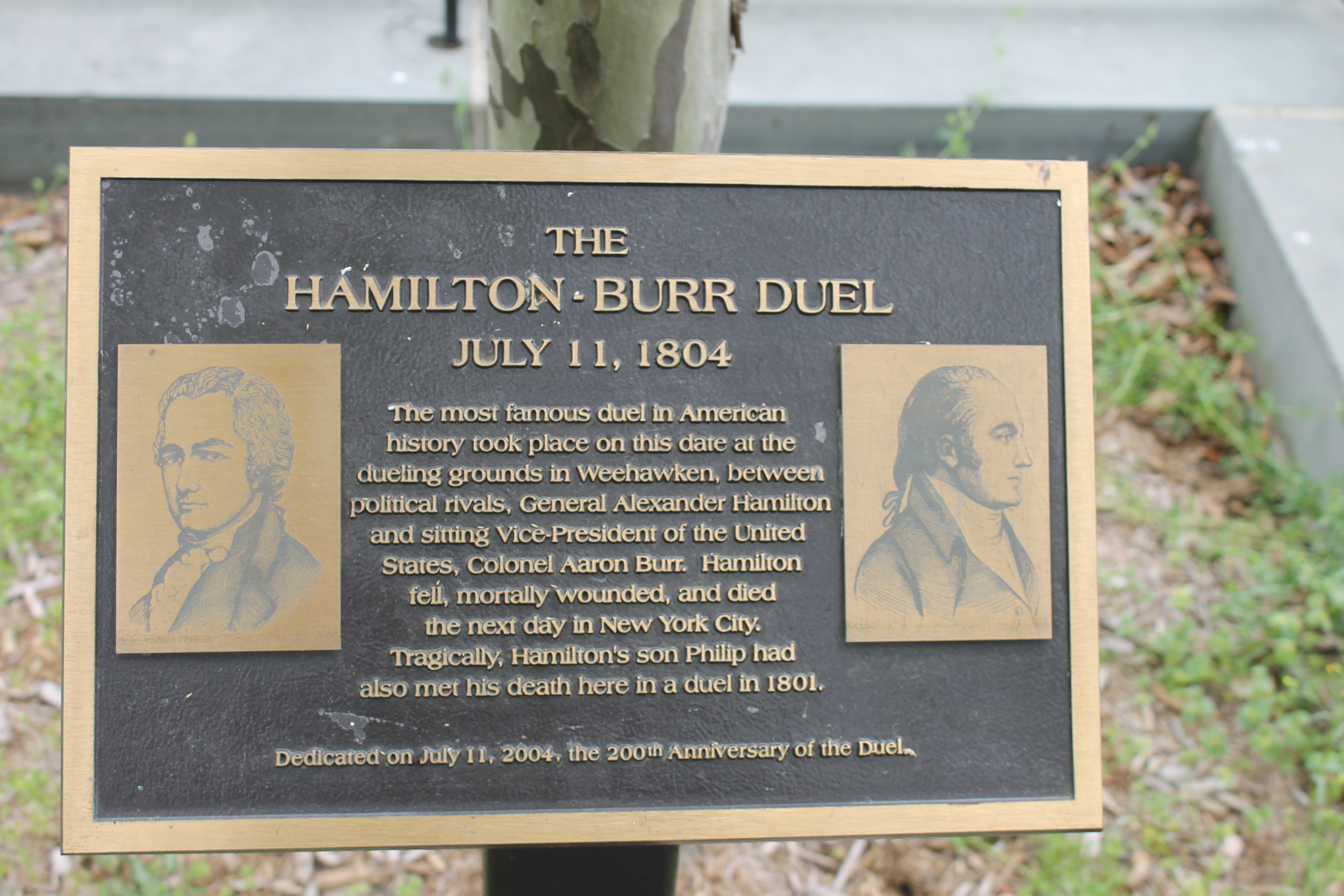
Historical marker of the Burr–Hamilton duel in Weehawken

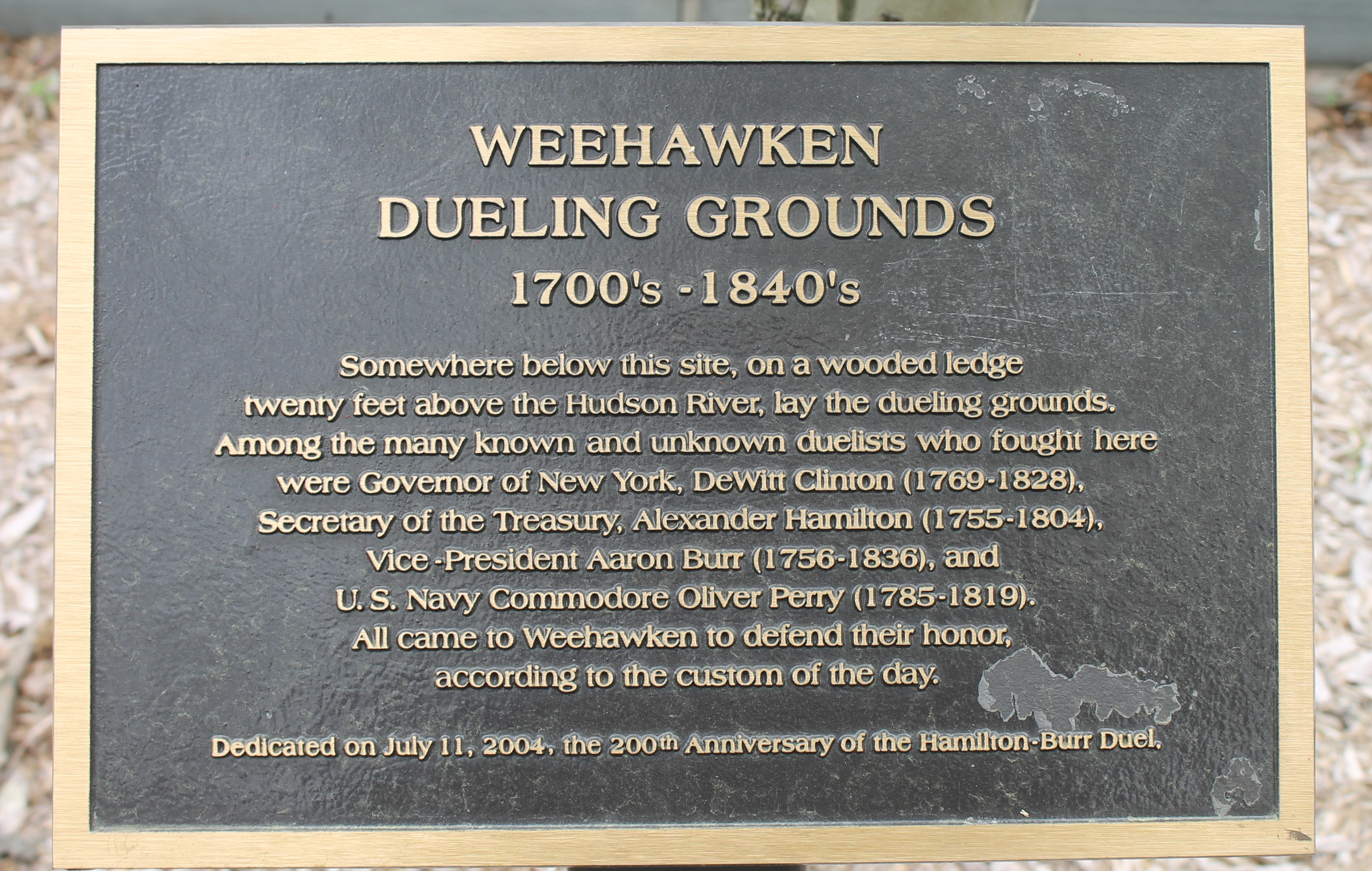
Weehawken dueling grounds historical marker, 2004

The Alexander Hamilton Monument on Hamilton Avenue, next to Hamilton Park, is the site of the second memorial to the Burr–Hamilton duel between Alexander Hamilton and Aaron Burr. The first, on the original duel site, was constructed in 1806 by the Saint Andrew Society, of which Hamilton had been a member. A 14-foot (4.3-m) marble cenotaph, consisting of an obelisk, topped by a flaming urn and a plaque with a quote from Horace, surrounded by an iron fence, was raised about where Hamilton was believed to have fallen. Duels continued to be fought at the site and the marble was slowly vandalized and removed for souvenirs, disappearing entirely by 1820. The tablet turned up in a junk store and found its way to the New-York Historical Society in Manhattan, where it still resides.

From 1820 to 1857, the site was marked by two stones, with the names Hamilton and Burr, placed where they were thought to have stood during the duel. When a road from Hoboken to Fort Lee was built through the site in 1858, an inscription on a boulder where a mortally wounded Hamilton was thought to have rested—one of the many pieces of graffiti left by visitors—was all that remained. No primary accounts of the duel confirm the boulder anecdote. In 1870, railroad tracks were built directly through the site and the boulder was hauled to the top of the Palisades, where it remains today, located just off the Boulevard East. In 1894, an iron fence was built around the boulder, supplemented by a bust of Hamilton and a plaque. The bust was thrown over the cliff on October 14, 1934, by vandals and the head was never recovered; a new bust was unveiled on July 12, 1935.

The plaque was stolen by vandals in the 1980s and an abbreviated version of the text was inscribed on the indentation left in the boulder, which remained until the early 1990s, when a granite pedestal was added in front of the boulder; the bust was moved to the top of the pedestal. New historical markers were added on July 11, 2004, the 200th anniversary of the duel.

== Government ==
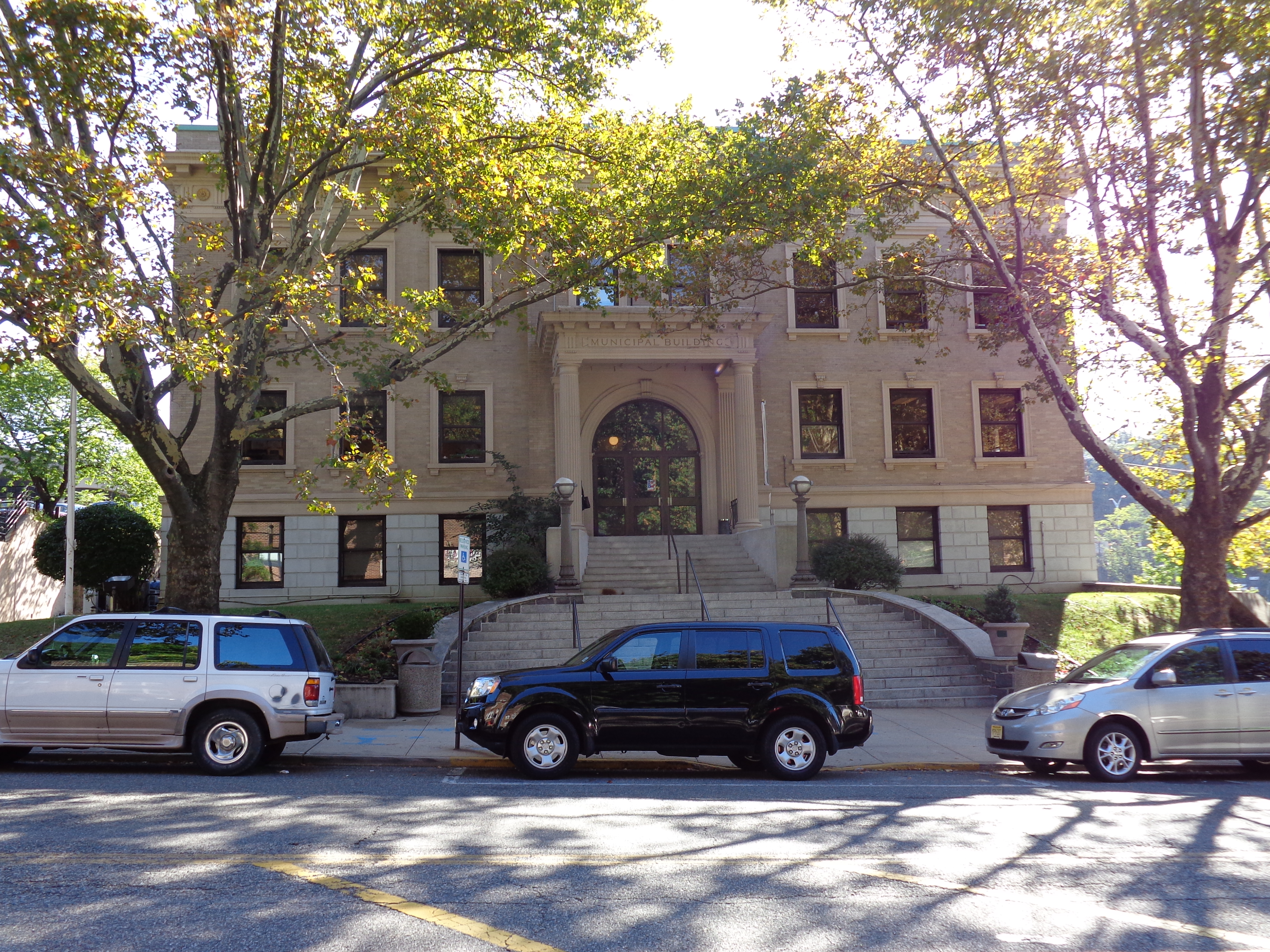
Weehawken Town Hall

=== Local government ===
Weehawken operates within the Faulkner Act, formally known as the Optional Municipal Charter Law, under the Council-Manager form of municipal government. The township is one of 42 municipalities (of the 564) statewide that use this form of government. The governing body is a five-member Township Council, whose members are elected to serve four-year terms of office on a concurrent basis in non-partisan elections held in May. Two council members are elected from the township at-large and the remainder are chosen from each of three wards. The council selects a mayor and a deputy mayor from among its members in a reorganization meeting held in the first week of July after the election.

As of 2026, the mayor of Weehawken is Richard F. Turner (at-large), whose term of office ends June 30, 2030. Turner has served in office since July 1990, after having served as town manager. Turner is one of longest-serving mayors in New Jersey. Other members of the Township Council are Susan Jennings (2nd Ward), David J. Curtis (3rd Ward), Carmela Silvestri-Ehret (1st Ward) and Deputy Mayor Robert Sosa (at large), all serving terms of office expiring on June 30, 2030. Giovanni D. Ahmad is the township manager.

=== Public safety ===
Weehawken is served by North Hudson Regional Fire and Rescue (NHRFR). Engine 3 and Engine 5 are assigned to two fire stations located in the township.

Weehawken Volunteer First Aid and the Weehawken Police Department were among the many Hudson County agencies that responded to the January 2009 crash of Flight 1549, for which they received accolades from the survivors.

=== Mayors ===
- Simon Kelly, 1887 to 1897.
- Edward W. Berger c. 1905
- Morris Frost, in 1908 for a week
- William H. Wood c. 1908
- George Gonzales c. 1908
- William M. Brady in 1917
- Emile W. Grauert (1855–1931), 1912 to 1931. He was born in 1855 in Manhattan and later worked as an architect. His mayorship was possibly split over non-consecutive terms. He died in the mayor's office on April 20, 1931, from a heart attack.
- Clara E. Grauert, the 72-year-old widow of Emile W. Grauert starting in 1931 filling the office of her husband
- John Meister in 1949
- Charles F. Krause Jr. in 1956.
- Stanley D. Ianoco from before 1972 to 1979
- Wally P. Lindsley (born 1949), from 1979 to 1982
- Stanley D. Ianoco, 1982 to 1990 (second non-consecutive term)
- Richard F. Turner (born 1950), from 1990 to present

=== Federal, state and county representation ===
Weehawken is located in the 8th Congressional District and is part of New Jersey's 33rd state legislative district.

For the 119th United States Congress, New Jersey's 8th congressional district is represented by Rob Menendez (D, Jersey City). New Jersey is represented in the United States Senate by Democrats Cory Booker (Newark, term ends 2027) and Andy Kim (Moorestown, term ends 2031).

For the 2026–2027 session, the 33rd legislative district of the New Jersey Legislature is represented in the State Senate by Brian P. Stack (D, Union City) and in the General Assembly by Gabe Rodriguez (D, West New York) and Larry Wainstein (D, North Bergen).

Hudson County is governed by the directly elected Hudson County Executive and by a Board of County Commissioners, which serves as the county's legislative body. As of 2025, Hudson County's Hudson County Executive is Craig Guy (D, Jersey City), whose term of office expires December 31, 2027. Hudson County's Commissioners are Kenneth Kopacz (D, District 1 - Bayonne and parts of Jersey City; 2026, Bayonne), William O'Dea (D, District 2 - Western Jersey City; 2026, Jersey City), Vice Chair Jerry Walker (D, District 3 - South Eastern Jersey City Yraida Aponte-Lipski (D, District 4 - North Eastern Jersey City; 2026, Jersey City), Chair Anthony L. Romano Jr. (D, District 5 - Hoboken and parts of Jersey City; 2026, Hoboken), Fanny J. Cedeño (D, District 6 - Union City; 2026, Union City), Caridad Rodriguez (D, District 7 - Weehawken, West New York, and Gutenberg; 2026, West New York), Robert Bascelice (D, District 8 - West New York, North Bergen, Secaucus; 2026, North Bergen) and Albert J. Cifelli (D, District 9 - Secaucus, Kearny, East Newark, Harrison; 2026, Harrison)

Hudson County's constitutional officers are County Clerk E. Junior Maldonado (D, Jersey City, 2027), Register Jeffrey Dublin (D, Jersey City, 2026) Sheriff Frank X. Schillari (R, Jersey City, 2025) and Surrogate Tilo E. Rivas (D, Jersey City, 2029)

=== Politics ===
As of November 2024, there were 11,359 registered voters in Weehawken. In March 2011, 50.7% were registered as Democrats, 11.6% were registered as Republicans and 37.5% were registered as Unaffiliated. There were 15 voters registered as Libertarians or Greens.

Gubernatorial election results for Weehawken
| Year | Republican | | Democratic | | Third party(ies) | |
| Year | No. | % | No. | % | No. | % |
|---|---|---|---|---|---|---|
| 2025 | 1,271 | 25.34% | 3,714 | 74.04% | 31 | 0.62% |
| 2021 | 910 | 26.02% | 2,562 | 73.26% | 25 | 0.71% |
| 2017 | 483 | 16.22% | 2,457 | 82.53% | 37 | 1.24% |
| 2013 | 1,070 | 42.18% | 1,407 | 55.46% | 60 | 2.36% |
| 2009 | 792 | 25.17% | 2,209 | 70.19% | 146 | 4.64% |
| 2005 | 676 | 24.43% | 2,052 | 74.16% | 39 | 1.41% |

In the 2012 presidential election, Democrat Barack Obama received 74.7% of the vote (3,692 cast), ahead of Republican Mitt Romney with 23.6% (1,169 votes), and other candidates with 1.7% (83 votes), among the 4,969 ballots cast by the township's 7,995 registered voters (25 ballots were spoiled), for a turnout of 62.2%. In the 2008 presidential election, Democrat Barack Obama received 72.4% of the vote (3,895 cast), ahead of Republican John McCain with 26.1% (1,406 votes) and other candidates with 1.0% (52 votes), among the 5,381 ballots cast by the township's 8,230 registered voters, for a turnout of 65.4%. In the 2004 presidential election, Democrat John Kerry received 65.0% of the vote (3,250 ballots cast), outpolling Republican George W. Bush with 33.8% (1,688 votes) and other candidates with 0.4% (26 votes), among the 4,997 ballots cast by the township's 7,293 registered voters, for a turnout percentage of 68.5.

Presidential Elections Results
| Year | Republican | Democratic | Third Parties |
|---|---|---|---|
| 2024 | 32.2% 2,171 | 64.7% 4,371 | 3.1% 171 |
| 2020 | 25.6% 1,824 | 71.7% 5,113 | 2.7% 101 |
| 2016 | 23.2% 1,286 | 73.0% 4,048 | 3.2% 176 |
| 2012 | 23.6% 1,169 | 74.7% 3,692 | 1.7% 83 |
| 2008 | 26.1% 1,406 | 72.4% 7,895 | 1.0% 52 |
| 2004 | 33.8% 1,688 | 65.0% 3,250 | 0.4% 26 |

In the 2013 gubernatorial election, Democrat Barbara Buono received 55.5% of the vote (1,407 cast), ahead of Republican Chris Christie with 42.2% (1,070 votes), and other candidates with 2.4% (60 votes), among the 2,637 ballots cast by the township's 8,135 registered voters (100 ballots were spoiled), for a turnout of 32.4%. In the 2009 gubernatorial election, Democrat Jon Corzine received 69.9% of the vote (2,209 ballots cast), ahead of Republican Chris Christie with 25.1% (792 votes), Independent Chris Daggett with 3.8% (119 votes) and other candidates with 0.9% (27 votes), among the 3,161 ballots cast by the township's 7,220 registered voters, yielding a 43.8% turnout.

United States Senate election results for Weehawken1
| Year | Republican | | Democratic | | Third party(ies) | |
| Year | No. | % | No. | % | No. | % |
|---|---|---|---|---|---|---|
| 2024 | 1,851 | 29.50% | 4,208 | 67.06% | 216 | 3.44% |
| 2018 | 1,045 | 21.27% | 3,717 | 75.66% | 151 | 3.07% |
| 2012 | 915 | 20.46% | 3,429 | 76.66% | 129 | 2.88% |
| 2006 | 758 | 22.83% | 2,528 | 76.14% | 34 | 1.02% |

United States Senate election results for Weehawken2
| Year | Republican | | Democratic | | Third party(ies) | |
| Year | No. | % | No. | % | No. | % |
|---|---|---|---|---|---|---|
| 2020 | 1,682 | 24.71% | 4,941 | 72.60% | 183 | 2.69% |
| 2014 | 464 | 19.73% | 1,835 | 78.02% | 53 | 2.25% |
| 2013 | 390 | 21.48% | 1,411 | 77.70% | 15 | 0.83% |
| 2008 | 1,151 | 25.03% | 3,363 | 73.14% | 84 | 1.83% |

== Education ==
The Weehawken School District serves public school students in pre-kindergarten through twelfth grade. As of the 2022–23 school year, the district, comprised of three schools, had an enrollment of 1,320 students and 130.6 classroom teachers (on an FTE basis), for a student–teacher ratio of 10.1:1. Schools in the district (with 2023–24 enrollment data from the National Center for Education Statistics) are Daniel Webster School with 391 students in PreK through 2nd grade, Theodore Roosevelt School with 328 students in grades 3–6 and Weehawken High School with 589 students in grades 7–12. The school system is known for its small classes and high ratings.

The Woodrow Wilson Arts Integrated School (grades 1–8), located in Weehawken, was part of the Union City School District.

The Weehawken Public Library has a collection of approximately 43,000 volumes and circulates 40,600 items annually. and is a member of Bridging Communities, Connecting Library Services. The landmark building, extensively renovated and updated in 1999.

== Transportation ==
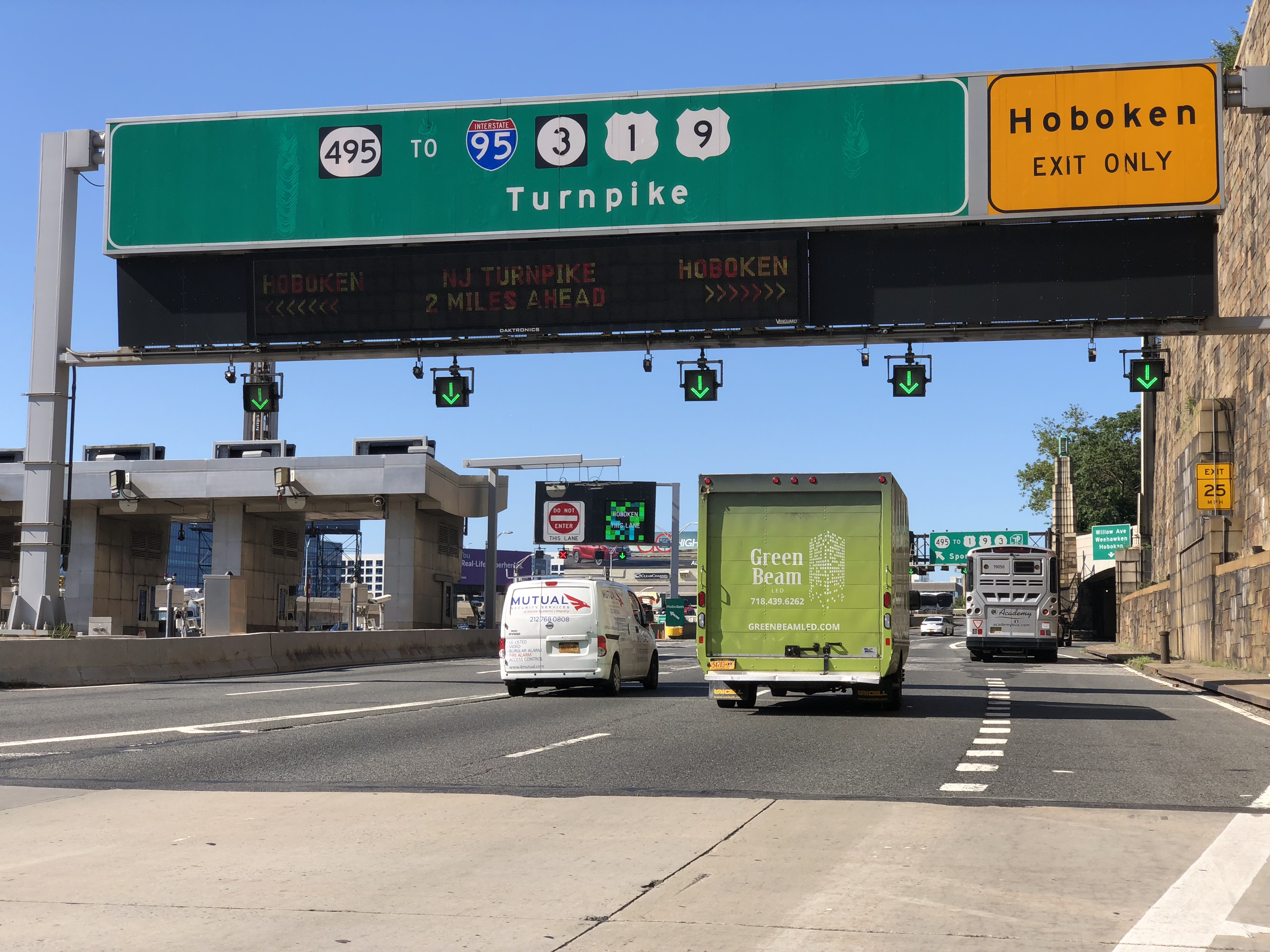
Route 495 westbound in Weehawken

=== Roads and highways ===
As of May 2010, the township had a total of 16.08 miles (25.88 km) of roadways, of which 13.35 miles (21.48 km) were maintained by the municipality, 1.30 miles (2.09 km) by Hudson County and 1.43 miles (2.30 km) by the Port Authority of New York and New Jersey.

Route 495 travels east-west between the Lincoln Tunnel and the New Jersey Turnpike (Interstate 95) with interchanges for Route 3 and U.S. Route 1/9 in North Bergen. The Lincoln Tunnel Helix in Weehawken carries traffic between the tunnel's toll plaza and the crest of the Palisades. County Route 505 also passes through the township.

=== Public transportation ===
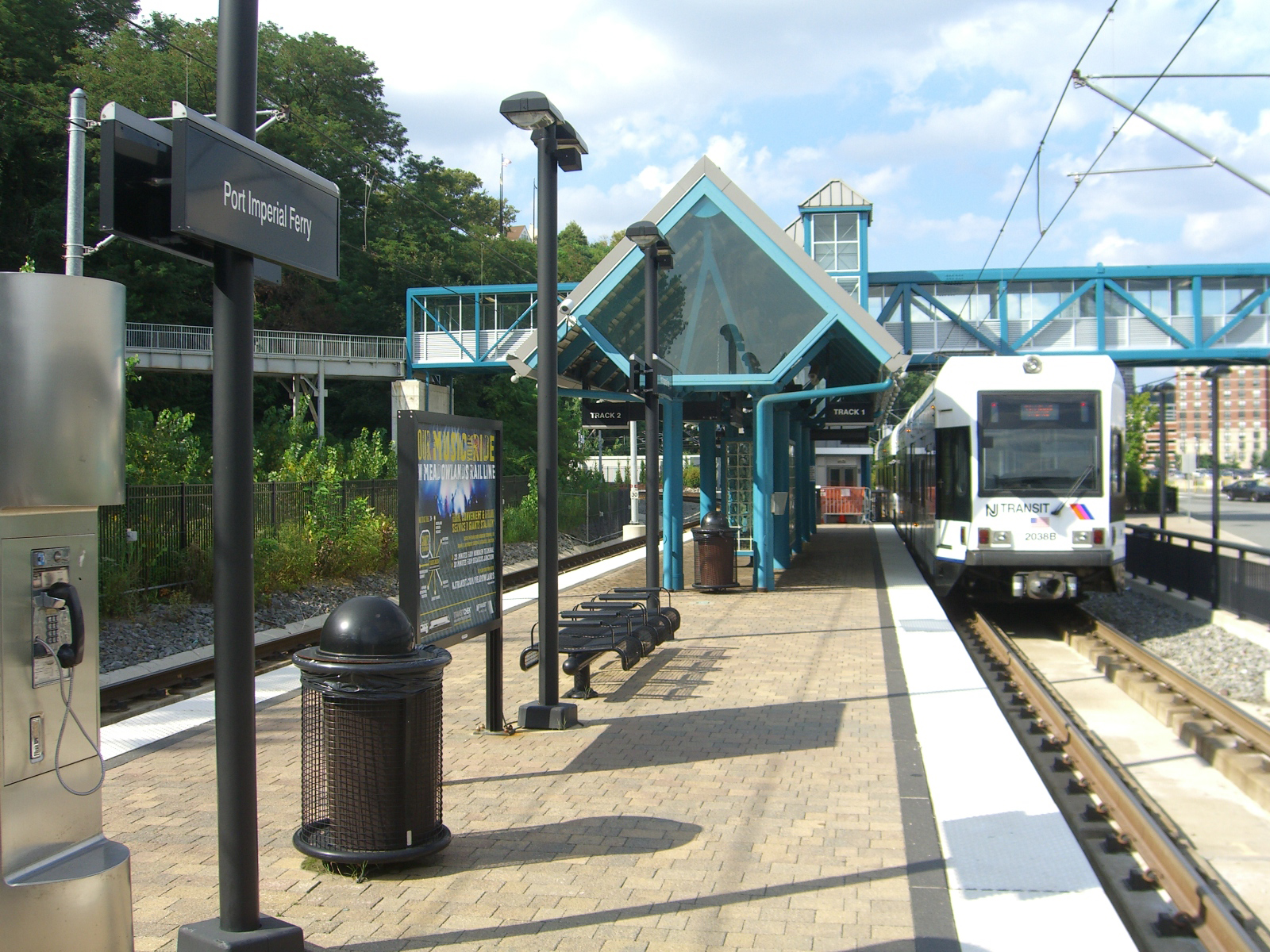
The Port Imperial stop on the Hudson-Bergen Light Rail

Public transportation in Weehawken is provided by bus, ferry, and light rail.

Bus service is provided along busy north-south corridors on Park Avenue, Boulevard East and Port Imperial Boulevard by NJ Transit and privately operated jitneys within Hudson County, and to Manhattan and Bergen County. NJT 123, 126, 128, 156, 158, 159, 165, 166, 168 originate/terminate at the Port Authority Bus Terminal. NJT 23 and 89 travel between Nungessers and Hoboken Terminal, where transfer is possible to PATH and NJT commuter rail. NJ Transit buses 84 and 86 travel between Nungessers and Journal Square or Pavonia/Newport in Jersey City. Routes 68 and 67 provide minimal peak service from Lincoln Harbor to the Jersey Shore.

Hudson-Bergen Light Rail (HBLR) service is available westbound to Bergenline and Tonnelle Avenue and southbound to Hoboken, Jersey City and Bayonne at the Lincoln Harbor station and Port Imperial station, where transfer to NY Waterway ferries to Midtown and Lower Manhattan is possible.

NY Waterway headquarters are located at Weehawken Port Imperial.

In 2013, a planned regional bike share system was announced by the Mayors of Weehawken and two cities to its south. Hudson Bike Share, launched in Hoboken in 2015, expanded to Weehawken in 2017. The program ended in 2020 when Hoboken joined the Citibike network.

== Media and culture ==
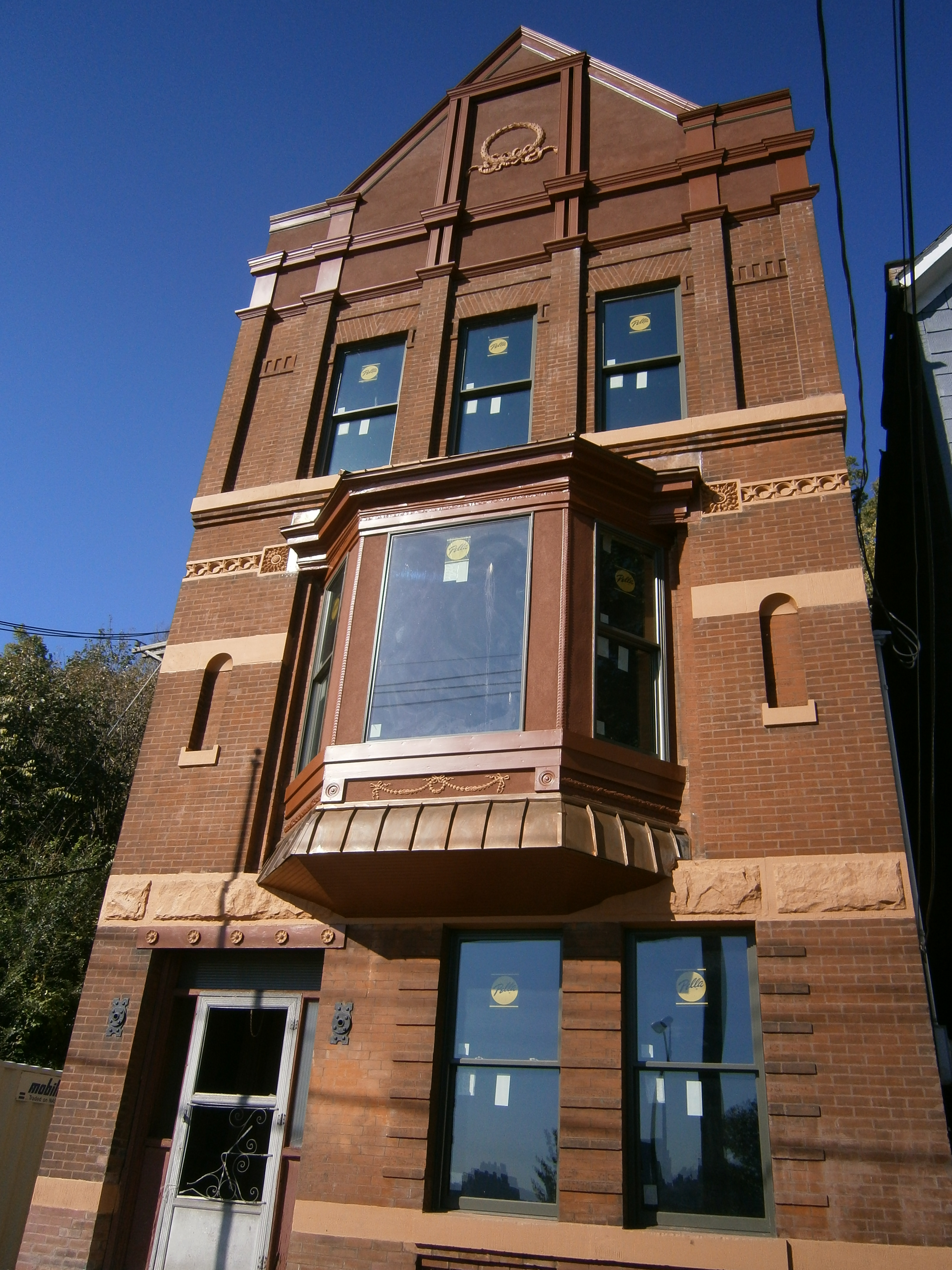
Original town hall at foot of Shippen Street steps undergoing renovation and transformation to local history museum

Weehawken is located within the New York media market and is no longer covered by a traditional newspaper. The Jersey Journal was a 157-year-old local daily paper covering news in Hudson County that absorbed the Hudson Dispatch in 1992, but ceased online and print publication in February 2025. The Hudson Reporter and the Weehawken Reporter also ceased publication in January 2023.

The area is served by the NY/NJ Spanish language weekly El Especialito and the Weehawken Gazette, a bi-weekly online newsletter.

The Weehawken Sequence, an early 20th-century series of approximately 100 oil sketches by local artist John Marin, who worked in the city, is considered among, if not the first, abstract paintings done by an American artist. The sketches, which blend aspects of Impressionism, Fauvism and Cubism, have been compared to the work of Jackson Pollock.

The Hudson Riverfront Performing Arts Center is a non-profit organization whose mission is to build a world-class performing arts center on the waterfront. Since 2004, it has presented both indoor and outdoor events at Lincoln Harbor. In May 2026 the township broke ground on a $25 million performing arts center which will be housed inside a "mixed-use development."

=== In popular culture ===
The name and the place have inspired mention in multiple works of popular culture.

- A collection of four houses on Boulevard East in Weehawken are the subject of the American painter Edward Hopper's 1934 painting East Wind Over Weehawken.
- In Dr. Seuss' 1940 children's book Horton Hatches the Egg, Horton the Elephant visits Weehawken while he is in the circus, and in Dr. Seuss's The Lorax, the Onceler gives directions to the land of the Truffula trees that include "...turn left at Weehawken."
- In the 1970s and early 1980s, jazz composer and pianist Thelonious Monk lived during his final decade until his death in 1982 in the modernist home owned by jazz patron and heiress Pannonica de Koenigswarter—which she bought from film director Josef von Sternberg and later dubbed "the Mad Pad" and "the Cathouse."
- The 1980 Italian science fiction/horror film Contamination features an Edwardian home on the corner of Boulevard East and 46th Street, in the scene in which a disgraced former astronaut is visited by the colonel who disgraced him.
- In "Brannigan, Begin Again", a 1999 episode of the animated television series, Futurama, Weehawken is shown to be the home of the former DOOP headquarters.
- The Broadway musical Hamilton includes a scene depicting the duel between Aaron Burr and Alexander Hamilton, as well as the duel between Phillip Hamilton and George Eacker.
- In a 2010 episode of Hawaii Five-0, Danny Williams reveals that during his years on the Newark Police Department, he used to live in a two-bedroom house in Weehawken.
- In the Apple TV+ animated musical, Central Park, a rap about Weehawken recorded by Daveed Diggs is sung by Helen, one of the characters, who is from there.

== Notable people ==
People who were born in, residents of, or otherwise closely associated with Weehawken include:

- Maryn Adriansen (1600–1654), first European settler in Weehawken
- Ed Alberian (1920–1997), entertainer, whose credits include early television's Clarabell the Clown on the Howdy Doody Show, The Beachcomber Bill Show, and Let's Have Fun
- Adele Astaire (1896–1981), Fred Astaire's elder sister, dancer and entertainer in vaudeville, on Broadway and the West End
- Fred Astaire (1899–1987), Hollywood actor/dancer
- Myril Axelrod Bennett (1920–2014), an early female executive in the advertising industry
- Eleanor Barooshian (1950–2016), singer and a member of the band the Cake
- Francis Bitter (1902–1967), son of Karl Bitter, physicist known for his research with magnets and long career at MIT
- Karl Bitter (1867–1915), sculptor, established an atelier, where he lived and worked until his death
- John H. Bonn (1829–1891), founder of North Hudson County Railway
- Kenneth Burke (1897–1993), literary theorist, poet, essayist, and novelist
- Marlene Caride (born 1963), politician who has represented the 36th Legislative District in the New Jersey General Assembly since 2012 and was nominated in 2017 to lead the New Jersey Department of Banking and Insurance
- Justin Casquejo (born 1997), free solo climber and stunt performer
- Helen Castillo, fashion designer and cast member of season 12 of the reality television series Project Runway who was born and raised in Weehawken
- Jack Cusick (1928–1989), right-handed shortstop who played for the Chicago Cubs and Boston Braves
- John Diebold (1926–2005), computer scientist, considered to be an automation evangelist
- John J. Eagan (1872–1956), Democratic Party politician who represented New Jersey's 11th congressional district in the United States House of Representatives from 1913 to 1921
- Ronald Enroth (1938–2023), Professor of Sociology at Westmont College
- Gary T. Erbe (born 1944), self-taught oil painter who is best known for his trompe-l'œils
- John Erskine (1879–1951), educator and author, who reflects on the town in The Memory of Certain Persons
- Edward Feigenbaum (born 1936), computer scientist who collaborated on the development of the first expert system Dendral
- Peter Fiordalisi (1904–1988), modern artist whose work was inspired by the New Jersey Palisades
- Marie L. Garibaldi (1934–2016), former Associate Justice of the New Jersey Supreme Court who became the first woman to serve on New Jersey's highest court when she was appointed by Governor Thomas Kean in 1982
- João Gilberto (1931–2019), Brazilian singer and guitar player, composer and bossa nova pioneer
- Nancy Giles (born 1960), CBS News reporter who, during the COVID-19 pandemic, produced "A brisk walk with Nancy Giles", which documented her walk around the town, in particular up the inclined block on which Weehawken High School is located and up Boulevard East
- Baker Grace, musician and songwriter
- Emile Griffith (1938–2013), professional boxer who was a World Champion in the welterweight, junior middleweight and middleweight classes
- Janet Hamill (born 1945), poet and spoken word artist
- Barry Harris (1929–2021), jazz pianist and educator
- Glenn Hauman (born 1969), writer, artist, editor and electronic publisher
- Robert Hilferty (1959–2009), journalist, filmmaker and AIDS activist
- Roscoe H. Hillenkoetter (1897–1982), director of the Central Intelligence Agency from 1947 to 1950
- Bob Kennedy (1928–1991), defensive back and halfback who played in the All-America Football Conference for the Los Angeles Dons
- A. J. Khubani (born 1959), founder, president and CEO of Telebrands Corp.
- James G. King (1791–1853), businessman and politician who represented New Jersey's 5th congressional district from 1849 to 1851
- Nica de Koenigswarter née Rothschild, (1913–1988), known as the "bebop baroness" for her patronage of many jazz musicians
- Franck de Las Mercedes (born 1972), postmodern artist
- Ed Lucas (1939–2021), blind sportswriter
- Lori Majewski, entertainment writer, communications strategist and consultant
- John Marin (1870–1953), early American modernist artist
- Trade Martin (born 1945), composer, songwriter and producer
- Steven Massarsky (1948–2007), lawyer and businessman who founded Voyager Communications
- David Mearns (born 1958), marine scientist and deep water search and recovery expert, specializing in the discovery of the location of historic shipwrecks
- Cecilia Mettler (1909–1943), medical historian who was one of the first full-time, and the first female, professors of the history of medicine in the United States
- Alice Duer Miller (1874–1942), poet and novelist whose work actively influenced political thought during the American suffrage movement and the nations's entry into World War II
- Miúcha (1937–2018), Brazilian singer and composer
- Thelonious Monk (1917–1982), jazz pianist
- Michael Noriega (born 1978), associate justice of the Supreme Court of New Jersey
- Liam O'Brien (born 1976), voice actor, writer, and voice director
- William E. Ozzard (1915–2002), New Jersey Senate president, 1963
- Kate Pierson (born 1948), vocalist and one of the lead singers and founding members of The B-52's
- William Ranney (1813–1857), painter best known for his depictions of Western life, sporting scenery, historical subjects and portraiture
- Dan Resin (1931–2010), actor known as Dr. Beeper in the film Caddyshack, and as the Ty-D-Bol man in toilet cleaner commercials
- Henry Reuterdahl (1870–1925), Swedish-American painter known for his nautical artwork
- Jerome Robbins (1918–1998), choreographer, famous for West Side Story and many works for the New York City Ballet
- Wilbur Ross (born 1937), investor known for restructuring companies who served as United States Secretary of Commerce from 2017 to 2021
- David Saperstein (1901–1990), lawyer and government regulator who helped create the Securities and Exchange Commission
- Gerard Schwarz (born 1947), conductor, currently with the Seattle Symphony Orchestra
- Theodore Seltzer (died 1957), manufacturer of Bengay
- Kenneth Steiglitz, professor of computer science at Princeton University
- Fred Stickel (1921–2015), newspaperman, notably publisher of The Oregonian
- Frank Tashlin (1913–1972), film director, whose credits include The Glass Bottom Boat and The Alphabet Murders
- Paul van K. Thomson (1916–1999), Roman Catholic priest, author and educator
- Amani Toomer (born 1974), wide receiver who played for the New York Giants
- Timothy Verdon (born 1946), Roman Catholic priest and art historian who specializes in Christian sacred art
- Percie Vivarttas, architect whose work includes Temple Beth-El in Jersey City
- Josef von Sternberg (1894–1969), film noir director who built a home in the 1940s that was sold in 1958 to Nica de Koenigswater
- Derrick Ward (born 1980), running back who played for the New York Giants
- Daniel Webster (1782–1852), statesman
- Grant Wright (1865–1935), cartoonist, illustrator and painter

== See also ==
- Bergen, New Netherland
- Gateway Region
- Gold Coast, New Jersey
- Hudson River Waterfront Walkway
- National Register of Historic Places listings in Hudson County, New Jersey
- North Hudson, New Jersey
