= Weehawken Cove =

Cove on the Hudson River in New Jersey, US

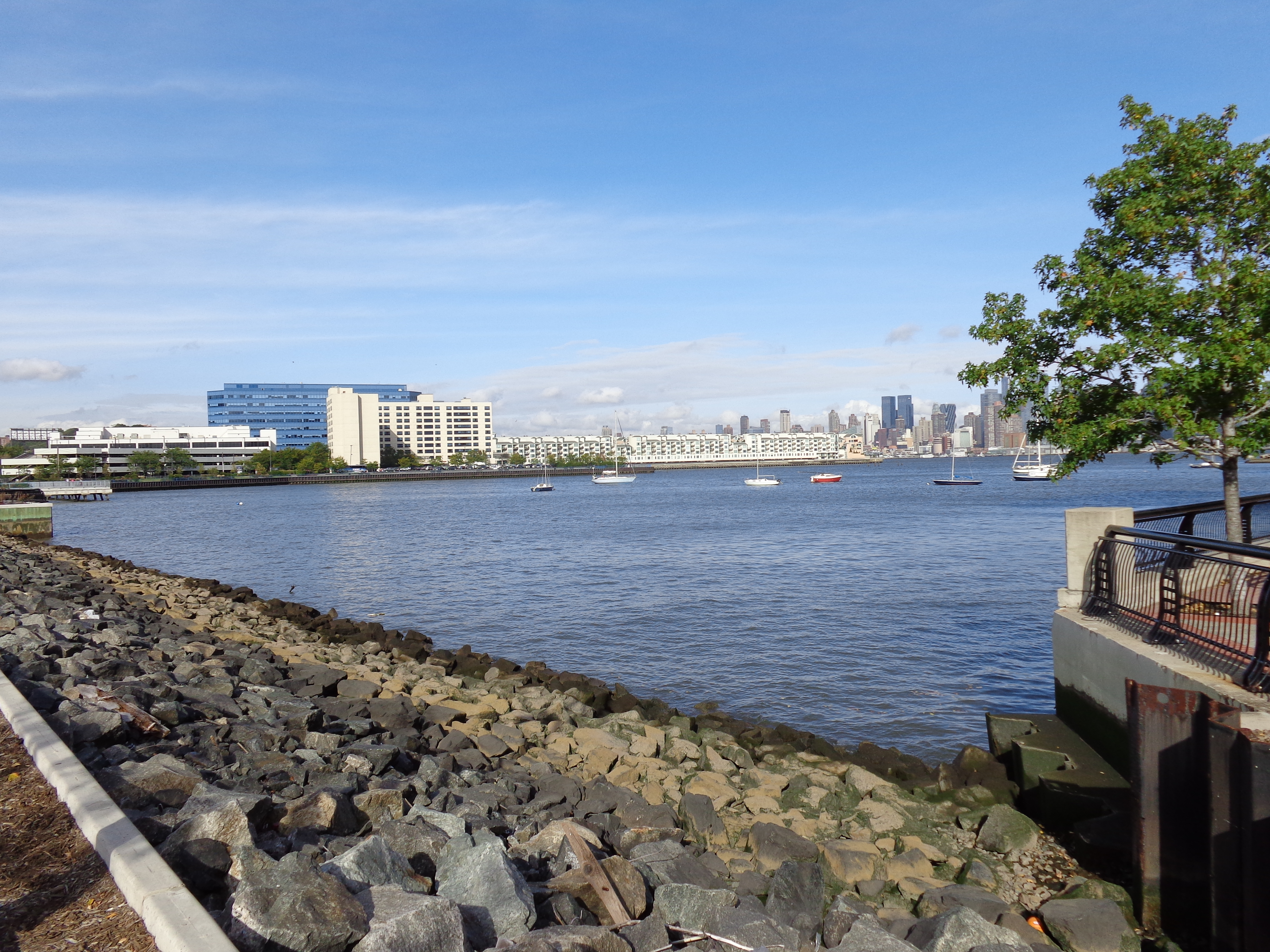
- Looking north to Lincoln Harbor with Manhattan in the distance

- Location within Hudson County, New Jersey
- Location: New Jersey, US
- Coordinates: 40.756425°N 74.025053°W
- Type: Cove
- Part of: Hudson River
- Settlements: Hoboken, New Jersey, Weehawken, New Jersey

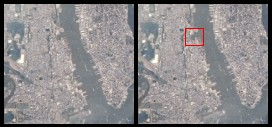
Image of Weehawken Cove taken by NASA. (Image on the right with red line shows where it is.)

Weehawken Cove is a cove on the west bank of the Hudson River between the New Jersey municipalities of Hoboken to the south and Weehawken to the north. At the perimeter of the cove are completed sections of the Hudson River Waterfront Walkway, offering views of Manhattan and the Palisades. The name Weehawken comes from the Lenape, and can translate as "at the end of", either the Hudson Palisades or the stream which flowed from them into the cove, later the site of the nearby Lincoln Tunnel.

== Half Moon ==
The first European to record visiting the cove was Robert Juet, first mate of the Half Moon captained by Henry Hudson, who anchored his ship in the cove on October 2, 1609.

He wrote: "We got down two leagues beyond that place and anchored in a bay clear from all danger of them on the other side of the river, where we saw a good piece of ground, and hard by it there was a cliff that looked of the colour of white-green, as though it was either a copper or silver mine, and I think it to be one of them by the trees that grow upon it, for they are all burned, and the other places are green as grass." The cliff described is now known as Castle Point.

== Lipton Tea and Lincoln Harbor ==
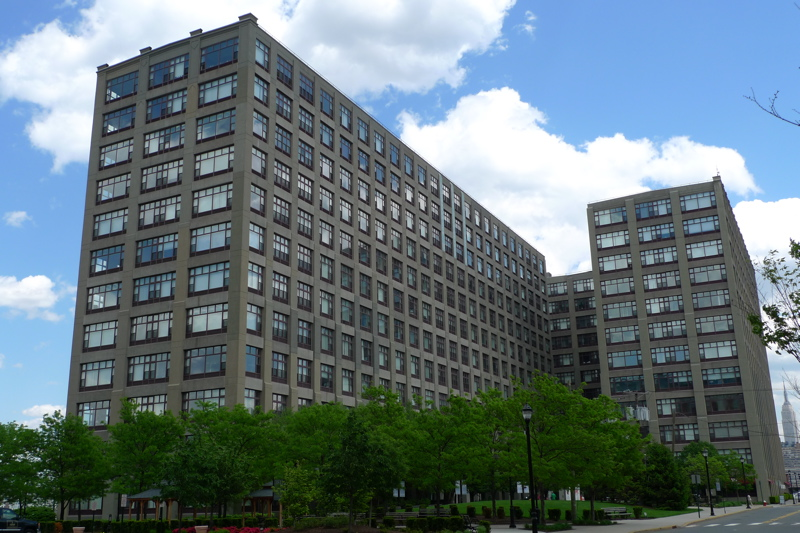
Hudson Tea Buildings were the former plant and warehouse of Lipton Tea.

A prominent landmark on the south side of the cove is the Hudson Tea Buildings, a converted residential complex in former plant and warehouse of Lipton Tea. Additional apartment complexes have been built along the cove in the last decade. The cove is two blocks north of 14th Street. On the north of the Cove is Lincoln Harbor, a residential, commercial, and recreational area on the site of the former Erie Railroad Weehawken Yard, which had partially filled the cove to be built.

Proposals to build residential buildings along the southern perimeter of the cove have been met with local opposition, including city officials in Hoboken, who contend the waterfront area is better used for public open space.

A proposal to build two 18-story buildings at the northwest corner of the cove were rejected by Weehawken.

== Hudson River Waterfront Walkway ==
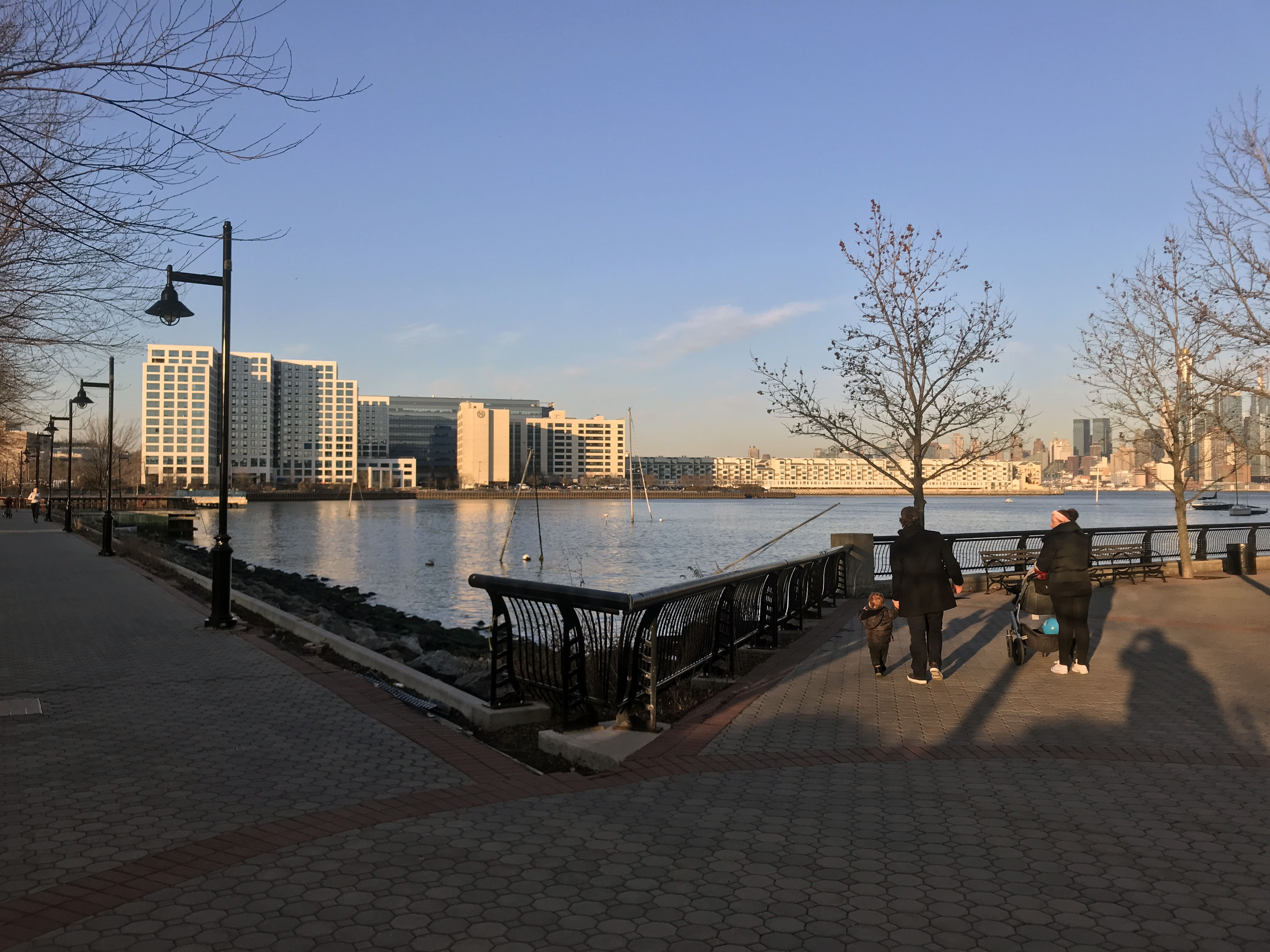
HRWW looking to Lincoln Harbor

In September 2010 county officials announced construction of an 800 foot section of the Hudson River Waterfront Walkway (HRWW) along the western perimeter of the cove, adjacent to the proposed Hoboken Cove Park. The walkway, which connects Weehawken and Hoboken, was completed in April 2012.

== See also ==
- Geography of New York-New Jersey Harbor Estuary
