= Lincoln Harbor station =

Hudson–Bergen Light Rail station in Weehawken, New Jersey

Lincoln Harbor Station
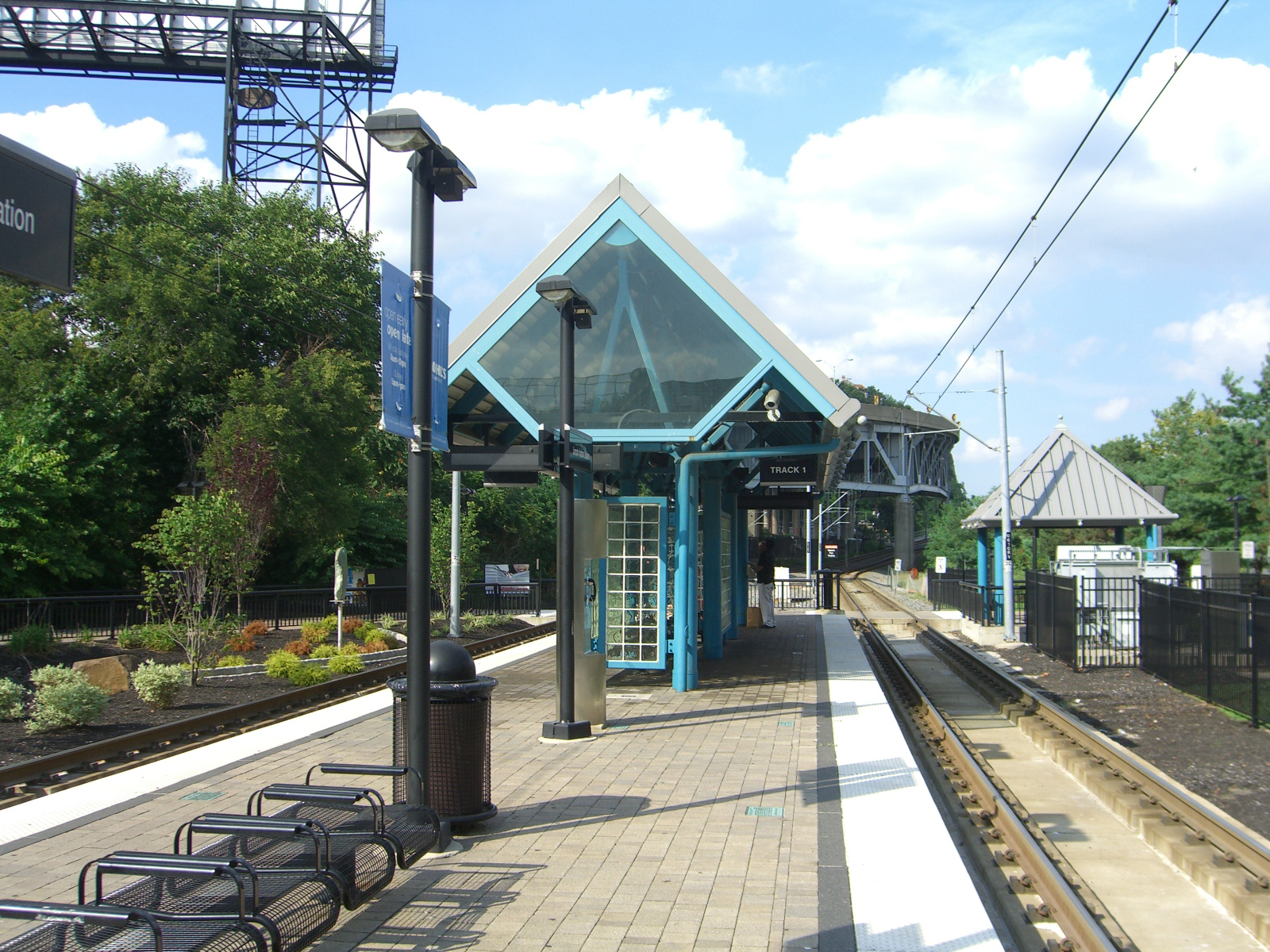
- Lincoln Harbor station platform in August 2009

General information
- Location: 1117 Waterfront Terrace; Weehawken, New Jersey
- Coordinates: 40°45′42″N 74°01′26″W
- Owner: New Jersey Transit
- Platforms: 1 island platform
- Tracks: 2
- Connections: NJ Transit Bus: 23, 64, 68, 156, 158, 159; NY Waterway

Construction
- Cycle facilities: Yes
- Accessible: Yes

Other information
- Fare zone: 1

History
- Opened: September 7, 2004

Passengers
- 2025: 883 (average weekday)
- Rank: 24 of 24

Services
Preceding station	NJ Transit	Following station
9th Street–Congress Street toward West Side Avenue	West Side–Tonnelle	Port Imperial toward Tonnelle Avenue
9th Street–Congress Street toward Hoboken	Hoboken–Tonnelle	Port Imperial toward Tonnelle Avenue
Location

Lincoln Harbor is a station on the Hudson–Bergen Light Rail (HBLR) located at Waterfront Terrace, north of 19th Street, in Weehawken, New Jersey. The station opened on September 7, 2004. There are two tracks and an island platform.

A five minute walk southeast from the station, at the intersection of Harbor Boulevard and 19th Street, is a ferry landing of the same name. NY Waterway provides commuter ferry service to the West Midtown Ferry Terminal in Manhattan.

It is the least used station on the Hudson–Bergen Light Rail at 861 boardings per weekday in 2024.

== Name and vicinity ==
The station's name is taken from the area along the Hudson Waterfront, with the Hudson River to the east, which in turn was named for the Lincoln Tunnel to the west. It is situated in the shadow of the Lincoln Tunnel Helix, which crosses the bluff at the end of the Hudson Palisades and descends in a circle to the art deco toll plaza and portals. To the east lies commercial and residential district, partially redeveloped by Hartz Mountain Industries, which had acquired the Erie Railroad yards that had once predominated the area north of Weehawken Cove in 1981. In 2011, it announced that it would continue residential development with the construction of three rental apartment buildings adjacent to the station to open in 2013. Erie's Pier D and Piershed is a remnant of the rail era listed on the New Jersey Register of Historic Places in 1984, and is now used as office space. While most of the route is at grade, just north of the station a bridge carries trains over a busy intersection at the foot of King's Bluff.

The municipal athletic fields of Weehawken Recreation Park are to the northeast, and north of that, Weehawken Port Imperial. The Hudson River Waterfront Walkway runs along the shore of the North River, providing access to the water's edge and marinas for recreational boating, and New York Waterway ferries to the West Midtown Ferry Terminal. UBS, Swatch Group USA, Hartz Mountain Telx (colocation center) are among the corporations which maintain offices in the neighborhood, which also hosts a Sheraton Hotel.
