= USS Weehawken =

USS Weehawken was a name used by the U.S. Navy more than once in naming its vessels:

- USS Weehawken (1862), a single-turreted monitor, launched on 5 November 1862
- USS Weehawken (CM-12), a minelayer, built in 1920 by William Cramp & Sons at Philadelphia
- Weehawken (YTB-776), a large harbor tug, laid down in August 1964 at Marinette, Wisconsin
