= Lincoln Tunnel Helix =

Elevated freeway structure in Weehawken, New Jersey, US

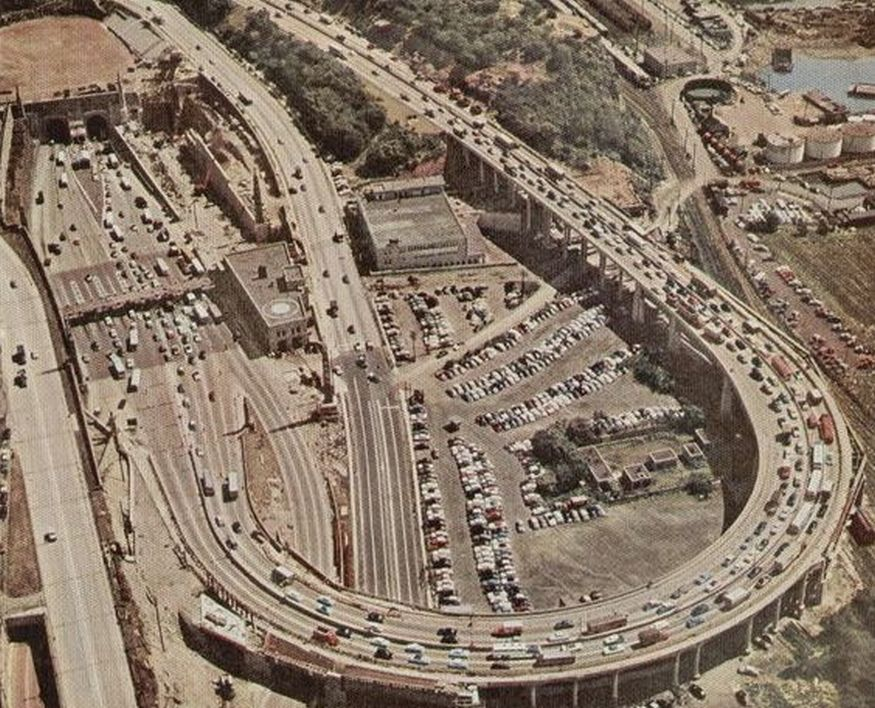
- Route 495 and the Lincoln Tunnel, as seen in 1955
- Coordinates: 40.7652562°N 74.0226380°W
- Carries: Route 495
- Crosses: The Palisades Cliff west of the Hudson River
- Locale: Weehawken, New Jersey
- Other name(s): The Helix, Route 495 Helix, the Corkscrew
- Owner: Port Authority of New York and New Jersey (PANYNJ)
- Maintained by: PANYNJ
- Website: www.panynj.gov/bridges-tunnels/en/lincoln-tunnel/helix-replacement-program.html

Characteristics
- Design: Helix-shaped spiral bridge
- Total length: ~4,000 feet (1,200 m)
- Width: 21.5 feet (6.6 m)
- Height: ~180 feet (55 m)
- Clearance above: 13.1 feet (4.0 m)
- No. of lanes: 7; 3 eastbound, 3 westbound, 1 reversible
- Design life: 82 years

History
- Built: 1937-1938
- Opened: 1938

Statistics
- Daily traffic: ~105,000 vehicles per day
- Toll: https://www.panynj.gov/bridges-tunnels/en/tolls.html

Location
- Map of the Helix loop

The Lincoln Tunnel Helix, known commonly as The Helix or the Route 495 Helix, is an elevated spiral bridge freeway that carries New Jersey Route 495 to and from the Lincoln Tunnel in Weehawken, New Jersey. It is an oval-shaped 270-degree loop between the Palisades cliffs and the entrance to the tunnel. The structure, built in 1937, is owned, operated and maintained by the Port Authority of New York and New Jersey (PANYNJ).

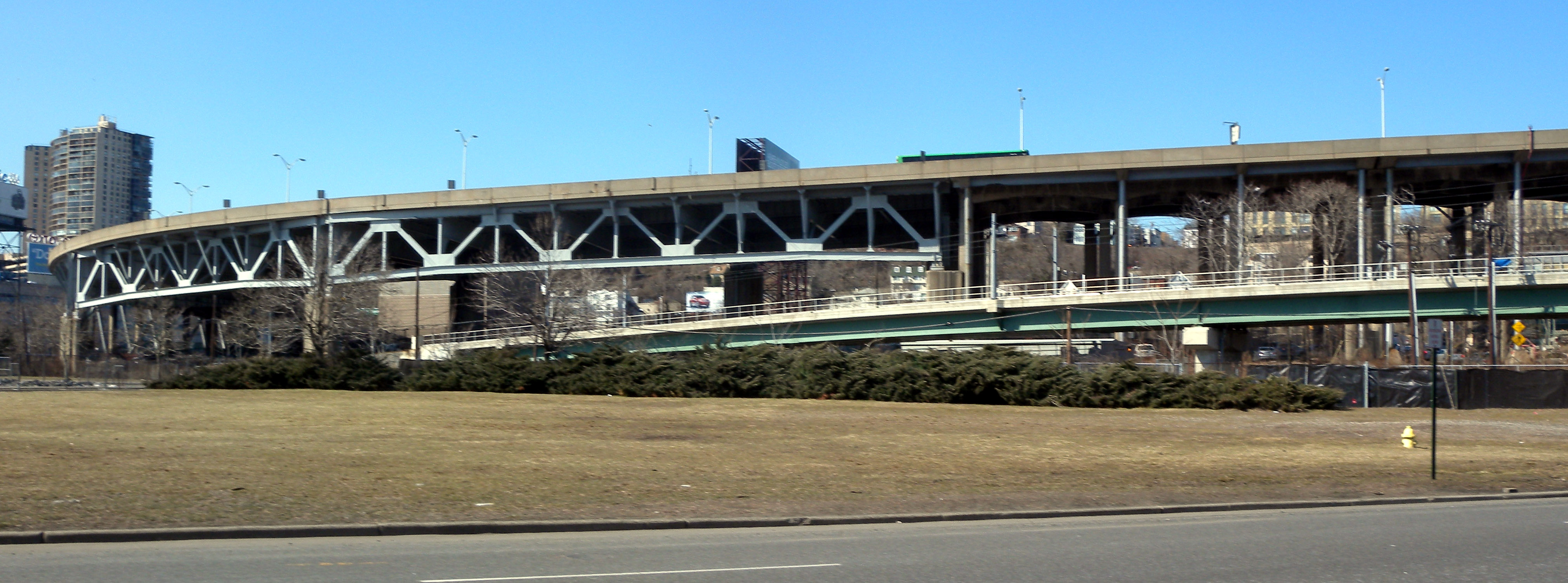
The Helix and Hudson–Bergen Light Rail bridge

== Description ==
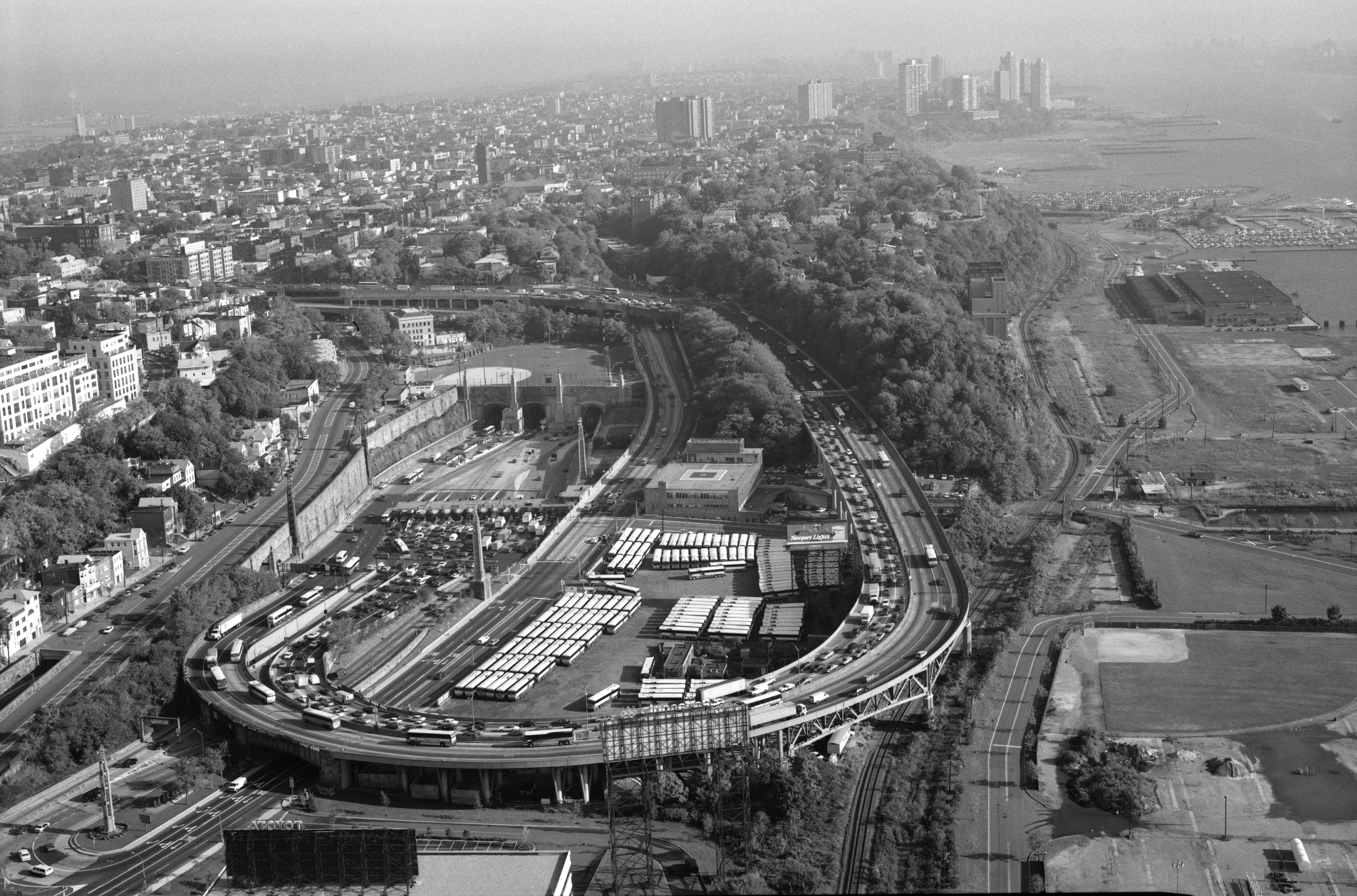
Birdseye view of the Helix, circa 1991.

Route 495 crosses through the northern part of Hudson County and connects the New Jersey Turnpike/Interstate 95, U.S. Route 1-9, and Route 3 with the Lincoln Tunnel. The Helix was built in order to connect the highway, later designated Route 495, at the top of the Palisades to the portals of the Lincoln Tunnel at the bottom.

Weehawken is located on southern end of the Palisades, where they reach a height of about 180 feet (55 m). The Helix has traditionally been known for offering a panoramic view of the Manhattan skyline. Weehawken has zoning laws prohibiting the construction of mid- or high-rise buildings that would obstruct sightlines from higher points in town, such as from the Helix. Nonetheless, construction of two new residential buildings in 2013 partially blocked the panoramic view.

The Helix is seven lanes wide, with three lanes eastbound (inner loop) and four westbound (outer loop); the innermost lane of the westbound side is the exclusive reversible bus lane, which gives buses a dedicated eastbound lane to the tunnel on most weekday mornings. Pedestrians and bikes are not permitted on the Helix. Trucks over 80 tons are banned from using the Helix or tunnel. The Port Authority of New York and New Jersey (PANYNJ), the owner/operator of the structure, defines the Helix to begin at Route 495 mile mark 1.8, at the eastbound exit for Pleasant Ave. It goes East and makes a turn around the Weehawken High School Stadium (which is built over the tunnel) to the south. It runs about 3,300 feet (1,000 m) south, then makes a quick 180 degrees turn clockwise to the north to touch ground, where the tunnel itself takes a 90 degree turn towards Manhattan to complete the oval. The roadway passes over Boulevard East twice, once at the top of the helix and again towards the bottom. Though no exact number is given, the Helix has a total length of about 4,000 feet (1,200 m) and a width of 86 feet (26 m).

The Route 495 corridor has been reported by the American Highway Users Alliance to be one of the most congested highways on the United States eastern seaboard. The Helix in particular, being just as busy as the tunnel itself, faces high levels of traffic congestion frequently and may carry up to 120,000 vehicles in one day, with particular traffic during the morning and evening rush hours. The weight limit on the Helix, which varies for vehicles and trucks with different axle counts, is strictly monitored and enforced by the PANYNJ. Generally, the set max weight for any single vehicle is 80,000 lbs, but it is lower for vehicles with fewer axles or different classes.

== History ==
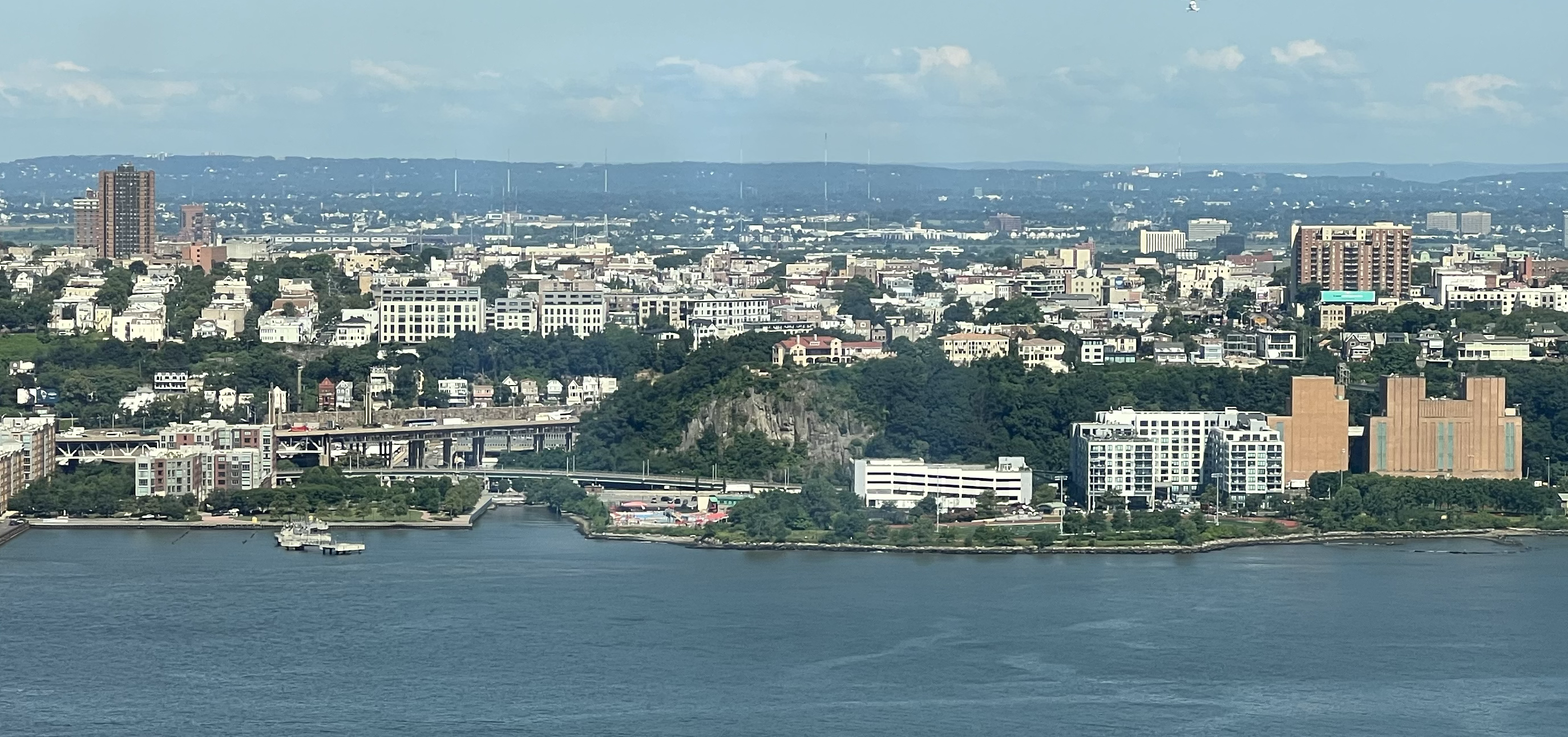
The Lincoln Tunnel Helix (left) and ventilation towers on the Hudson Palisades

When finding a way to build a highway to the Lincoln Tunnel, the Palisades cliffs presented an obstacle. Originally, it was proposed that the highway would cut through the Palisades via an underground tunnel that would go straight to the toll plaza or the tunnel itself; instead the PANYNJ realized this was not feasible and would disrupt much of the cities, so they opted to build the Helix instead, which goes above the cliffs to make an oval-shaped loop above below roads, including Boulevard East. To make enough room for the toll plaza area and merging lanes into the center or southern tube, the highway has to go about 2,000 feet (610 m) south of the tunnel portal and then make a quick U-turn back to the north to the toll plaza.

When it was originally built in 1937, the Helix had six lanes; it was widened to seven in 1957. From 2012 to 2014 the Helix underwent nightly eastbound closures for extensive repairs.

The Helix, along with the Lincoln Tunnel and all of Route 495, used to be a part of the Interstate Highway System, signed as I-495 (despite not being completely up to Interstate Highway standards). It was intended to connect to the Long Island Expressway, which was also designated I-495. However, a highway between the Lincoln Tunnel to the Queens-Midtown Tunnel (the start of today’s I-495) was cancelled, and left the two portions disconnected. In the 1980s, the NJDOT demoted the highway, Helix, and tunnel to a state highway.

In 1991, the tunnel and approach were documented by the Historic American Engineering Record. The Helix, as part of the Lincoln Tunnel Approach, is considered eligible for New Jersey Register of Historic Places for engineering in transportation for architecture and design.

As of 2015, the Helix was considered by the PANYNJ to have a working life-span of ten years. Alternatives to its replacement included tunnels under the Palisades directly to the Lincoln Tunnel portals. In 2012, the roadway of the Helix was repaved, then was fixed up in 2015 in what the Port Authority described as the “Helix Fix.” It is expected to undergo complete rehabilitation starting in 2023 and is expected to be fully refurbished by 2027.

== In popular culture ==
The Helix is featured in the opening credits to each episode of the HBO TV series The Sopranos. The intro shows protagonist Tony Soprano exiting the tunnel, driving onto the Helix looking out towards Manhattan with James Gandolfini’s credit on screen, before transitioning to the turnpike.

== See also ==
- List of bridges, tunnels, and cuts in Hudson County, New Jersey
- List of tunnels documented by the Historic American Engineering Record in New Jersey
- Bergen Hill
