= Pershing Field =

City square and park in the Heights of Jersey City, New Jersey, United States

Coordinates: 40°44′32″N 74°3′12″W

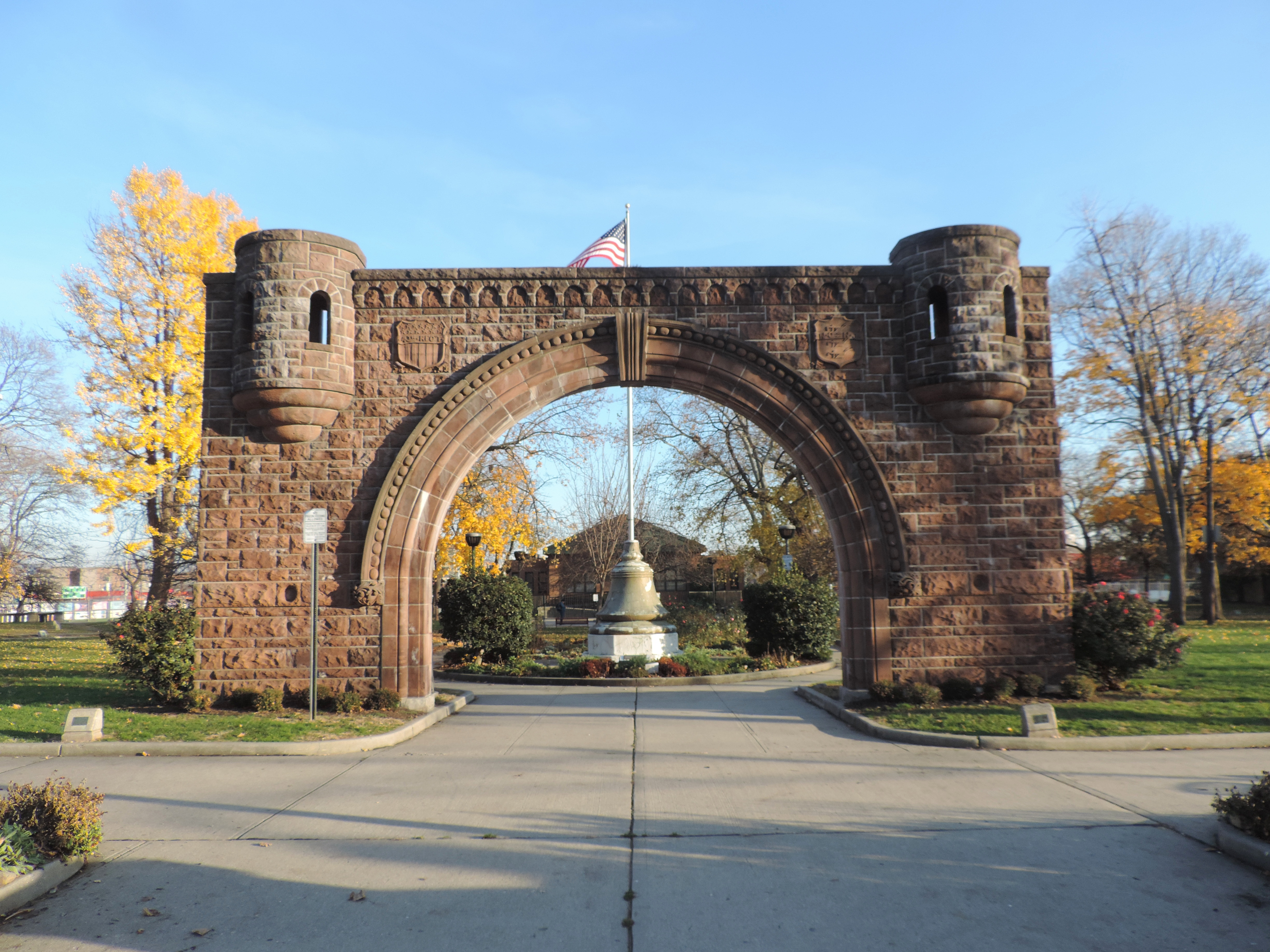
The Arch of the 4th Regiment Armory was dismantled in 1927 was relocated and reconstructed in 1941.

Pershing Field is a city square and park in the Heights of Jersey City, New Jersey in the United States. Approximately 13.5 acres (5.5 ha) it is adjacent to Jersey City Reservoir No. 3, with which it creates a large open recreational and nature area bounded by Summit Avenue, Central Avenue, and Manhattan Avenue.

== Creation ==
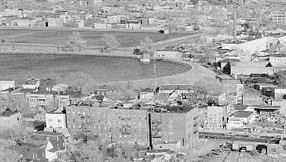
Reservoir No.1 (foreground, and since demolished) and Reservoir No.3. Pershing Field (not shown) was originally planned for Reservoir No. 2.

The site had been intended for a reservoir, and extension of the system connected to Reservoir #3. The park, originally planned in 1918 as Reservoir Park, opened for track and field events in 1919, including those of the Amateur Athletic Union, as well as other passive and recreational activities. It was designed by the noted landscape architect Charles N. Lowrie, responsible for Lincoln Park and the Stephen R. Gregg Park in Bayonne. Dedicated in 1922. the park was named for General John J. Pershing, associating it with the previous use of the grounds as a World War I military training ground. Although invited, General Pershing declined an invitation to attend the July 4 opening ceremony with a letter of apology. It continued to be used for track meets into the 1930s, hosting Stanisława Walasiewicz and Babe Didrikson Zaharias, among others.

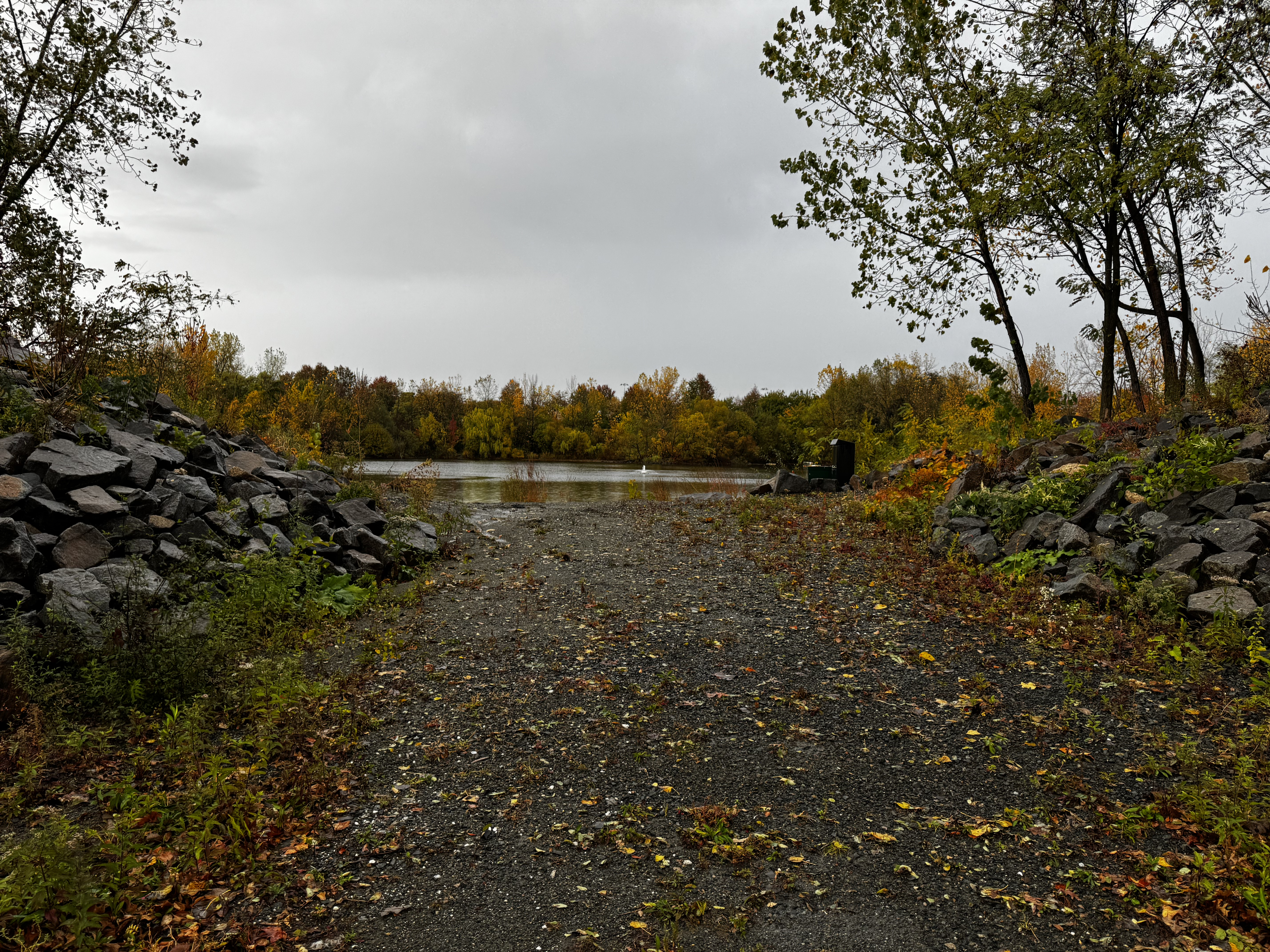
Jersey City Reservoir No. 3 adjacent to Pershing Field

On August 25, 1936, Pershing Field was the site of an exhibition baseball game between the House of David and the Pershing Field All Stars. The House of David was a traveling novelty team known for its long hair and beards and associated with a communal religious society from Michigan. The All Stars was a team selected for their batting and fighting skills by a committee from the regular season teams and coached by Andy Benedict. The All Star Team consisted of the following players: Tom Donovan of the Paramounts; Charley Barabus, Jack Deegan, and Ed Koski of the McCormacks; Wally Ford from St. Peters; Frank (Chubby) Ullmann of the Watsons; Lou Snyder, Bill Hefron, Paul McCarron, Joe Curley, and Meade Coyle of the Beacons; Lefty Tatano, Havens, Grumstead, and Kelly of the Benedicts; Jordan of the Farmers; Joe Agussa, and Hoffman of the Anchors; and Loschen and Eddie Edwards of the Pierce Athletic League; and Marty Lawlor of Bonginos.

== Memorials ==
Over the years it has come to serve as a memorial park for servicemen since World War I. At Summit Avenue there is a large arch made of reddish sandstone, the only remnant of the Fourth Regiment Armory building that once stood at the site of the Hudson Catholic Regional High School. It was reconstructed in Pershing Field in 1941 and later named a Jersey City designated historic site. Nearby are plaques in honor of Jersey City Mayor Frank Hague and New Jersey Governor A. Harry Moore. A statue America Triumphant designed by James Novelli, commemorates the 147 Hudson County residents who lost their lives during WW1. Other commemorative monuments to US military personnel are the Korean War memorial dedicated on Armistice Day, November 11, 1998, and the Jersey City Vietnam Veterans Memorial on Memorial Day, May 28, 2001. Along the walking paths throughout the park are small stone markers with plaques bearing the names of veterans from both World Wars. The Heights Vietnam Veterans Memorial Community Center was dedicated in 1986.

== Recreational facilities ==
At the Central Avenue side of there are number of recreational venues for track, baseball, and tennis as well as a swimming pool and a skating rink. A children's playground is at the southern end of the park.

== See also ==
- List of public art in Jersey City, New Jersey
- Pershing Road (Weehawken)
- Sports in Jersey City, New Jersey

== Gallery ==
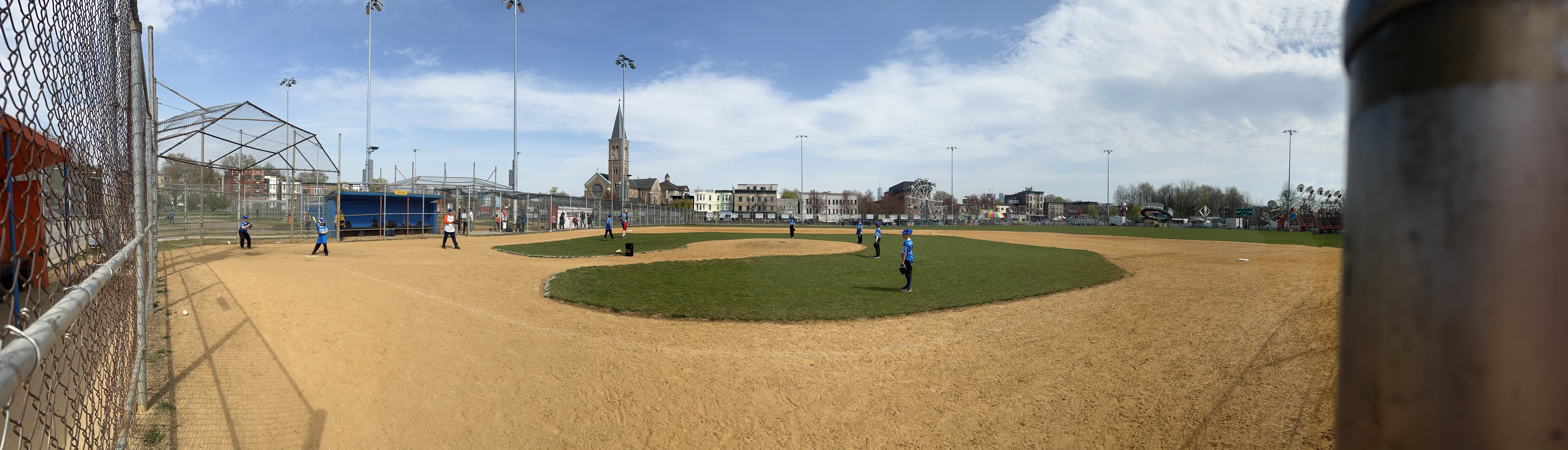
Panoramic view of Pershing Field Baseball Field

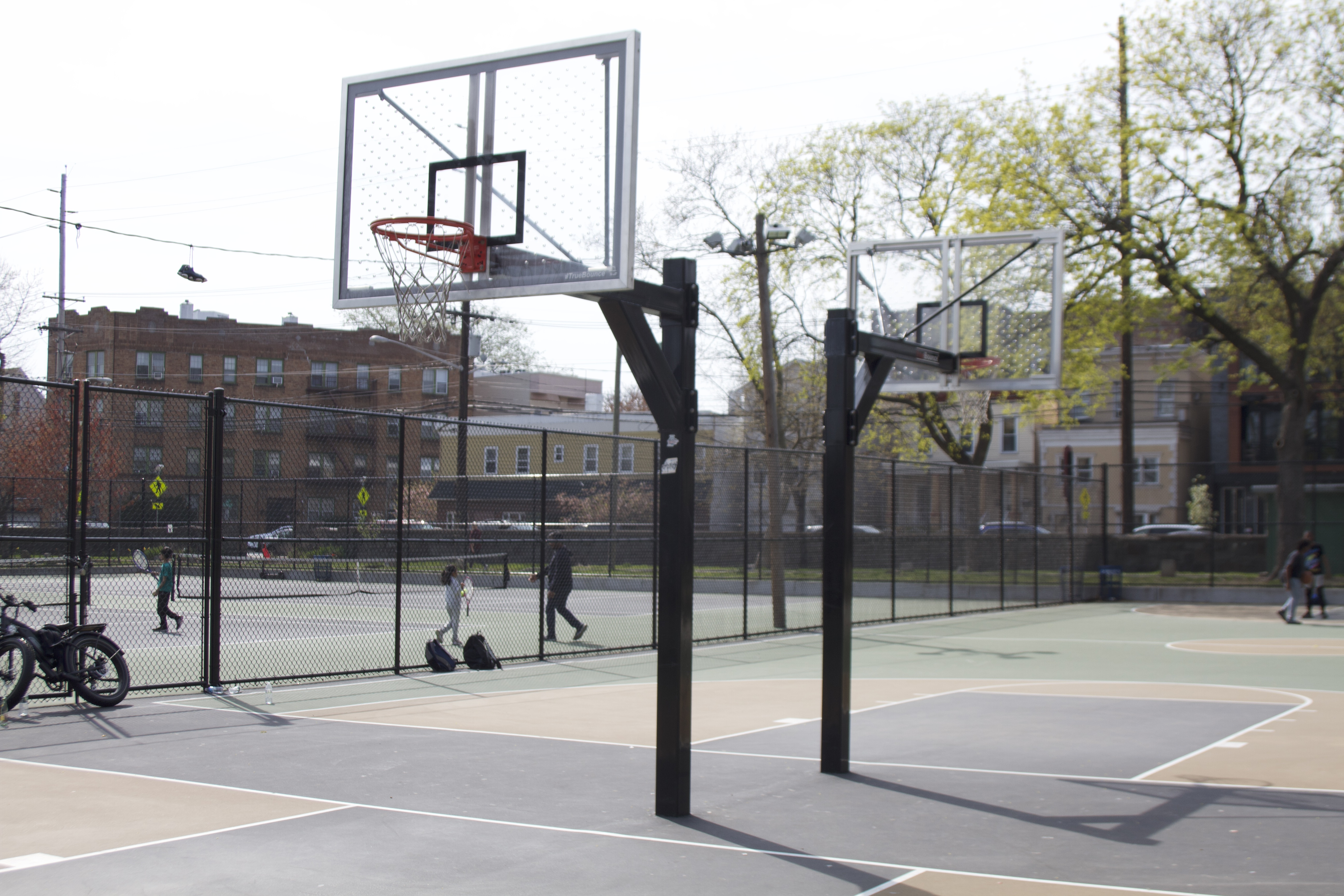
Pershing Field Basketball Court

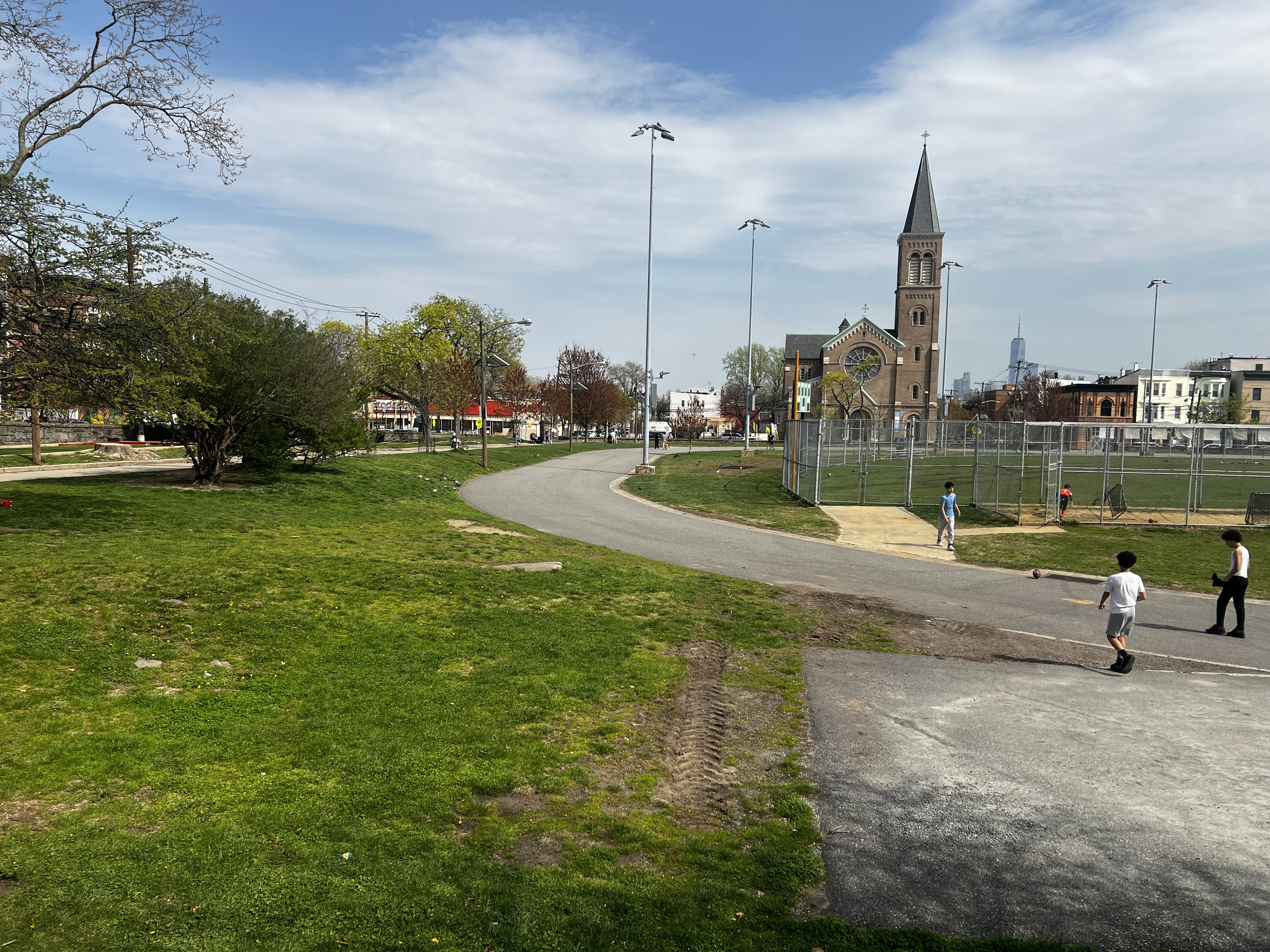
Pershing Field Track

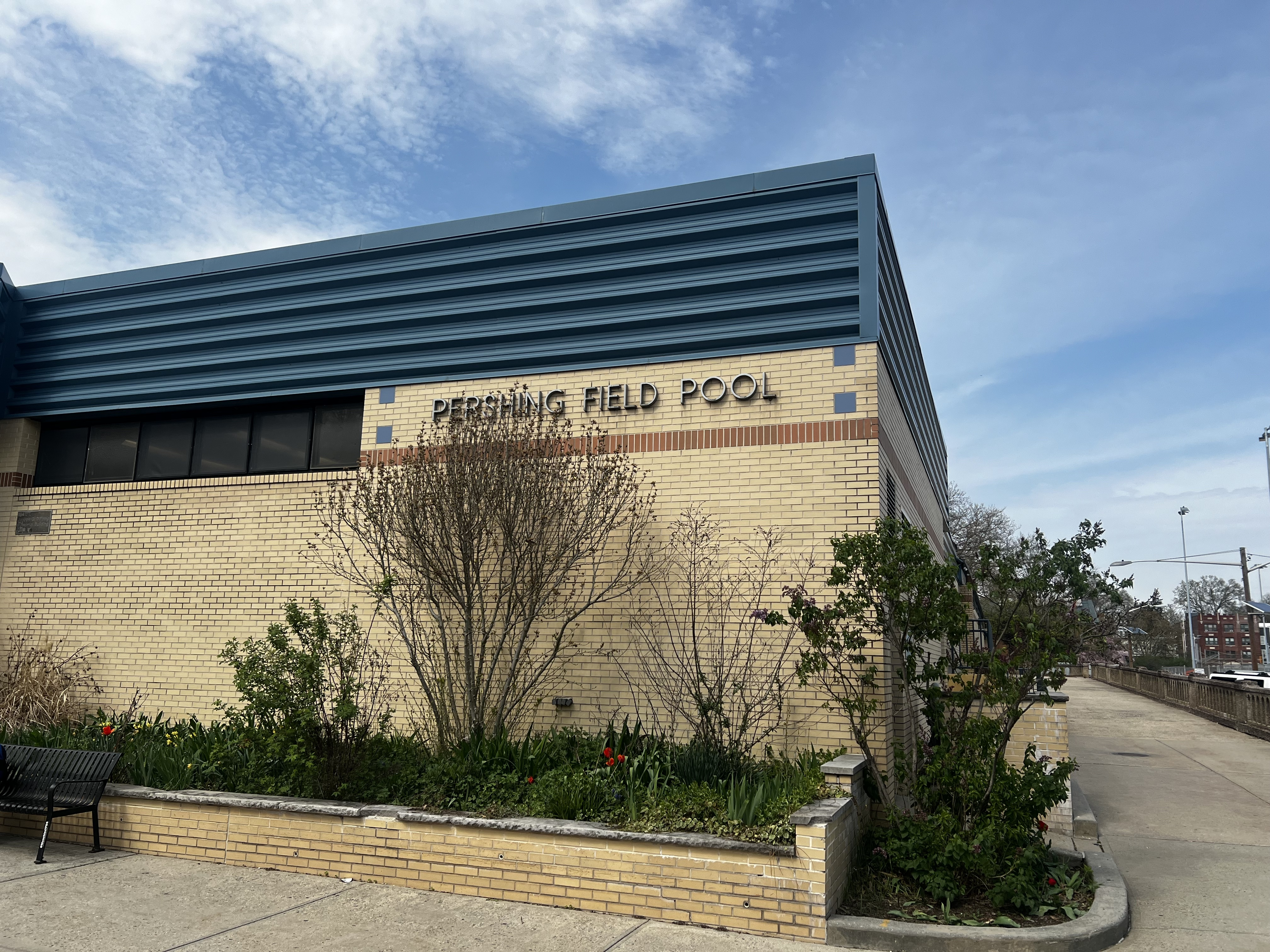
Pershing Field Pool

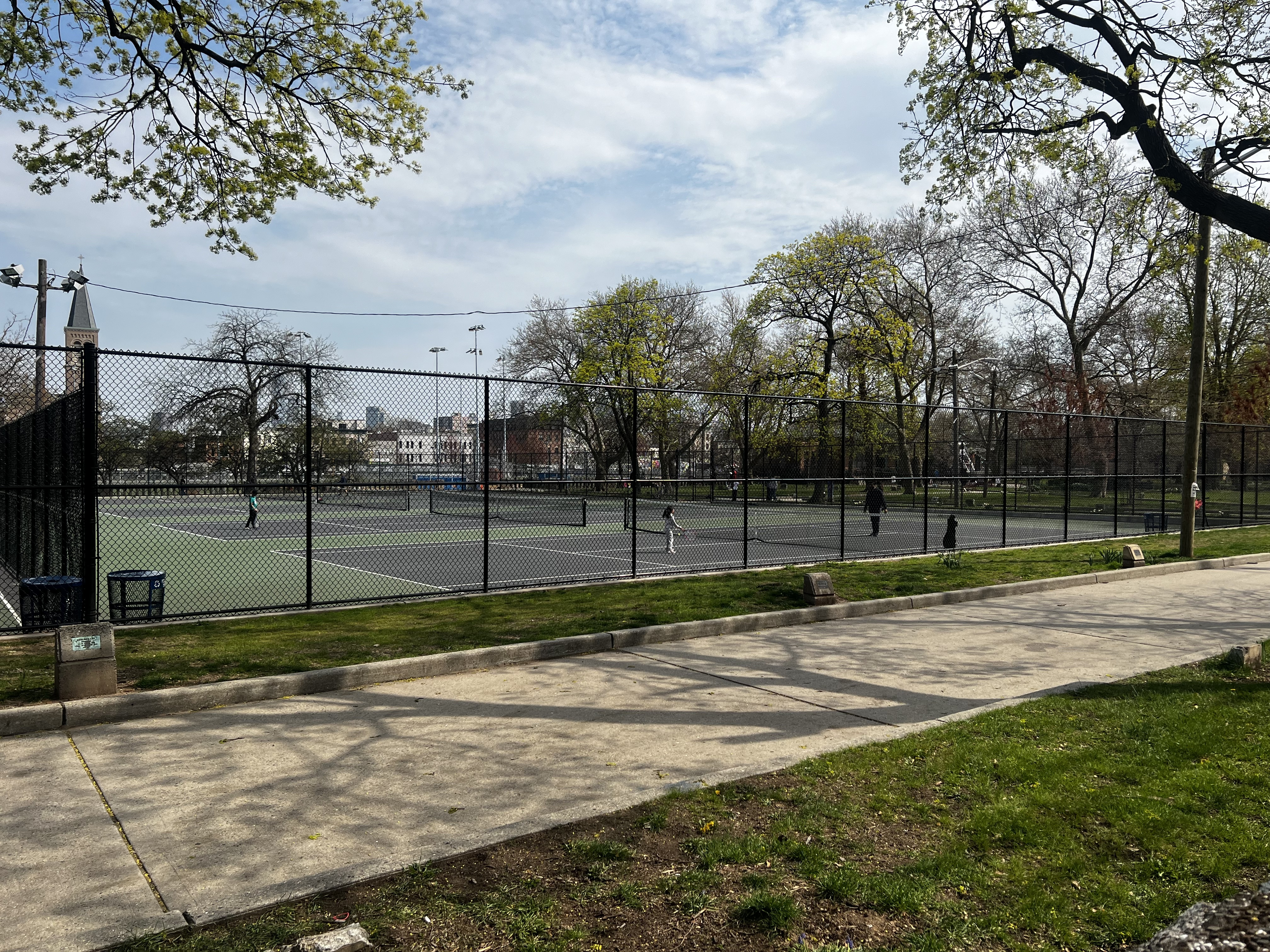
Pershing Field Tennis Court

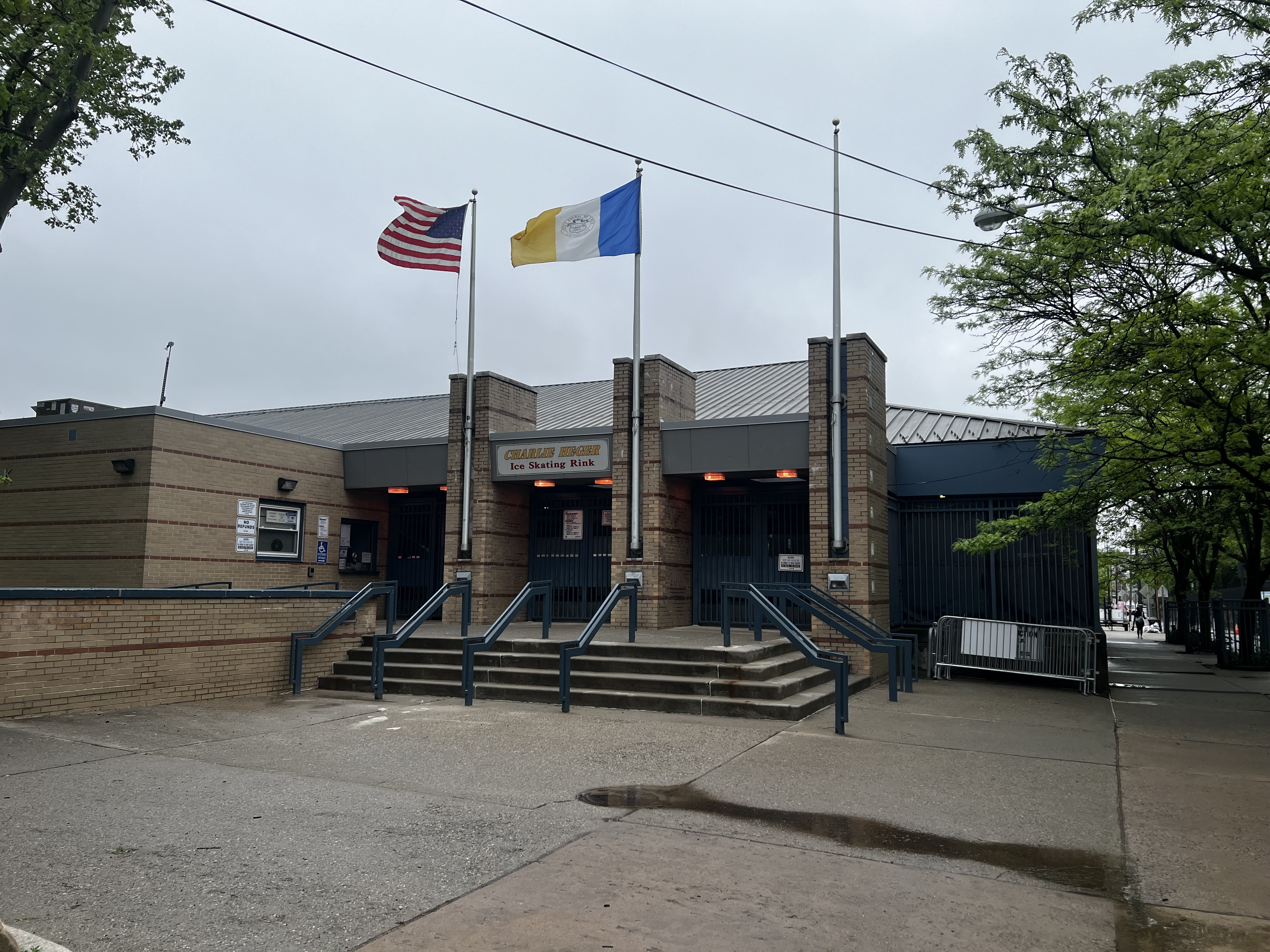
Charlie Heger Ice Skating Rink at Pershing Field
