= Historic districts in Hudson County, New Jersey =

Hudson County, New Jersey has historic districts which have been designated as such on a municipal, state, or federal level, or combination therof. Some are listed on New Jersey Register of Historic Places and are included on National Register of Historic Places listings in Hudson County, New Jersey. The following is intended to be a list of places which encompasses an area or group of buildings or structures.

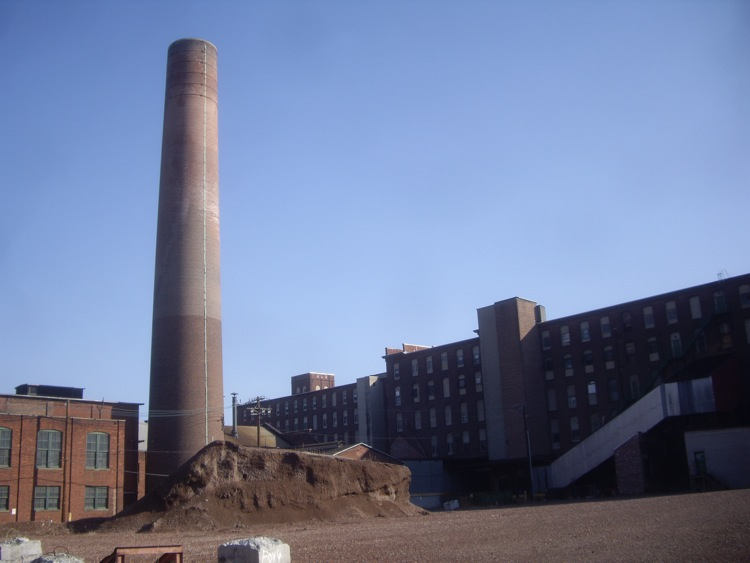
Clark Thread Company

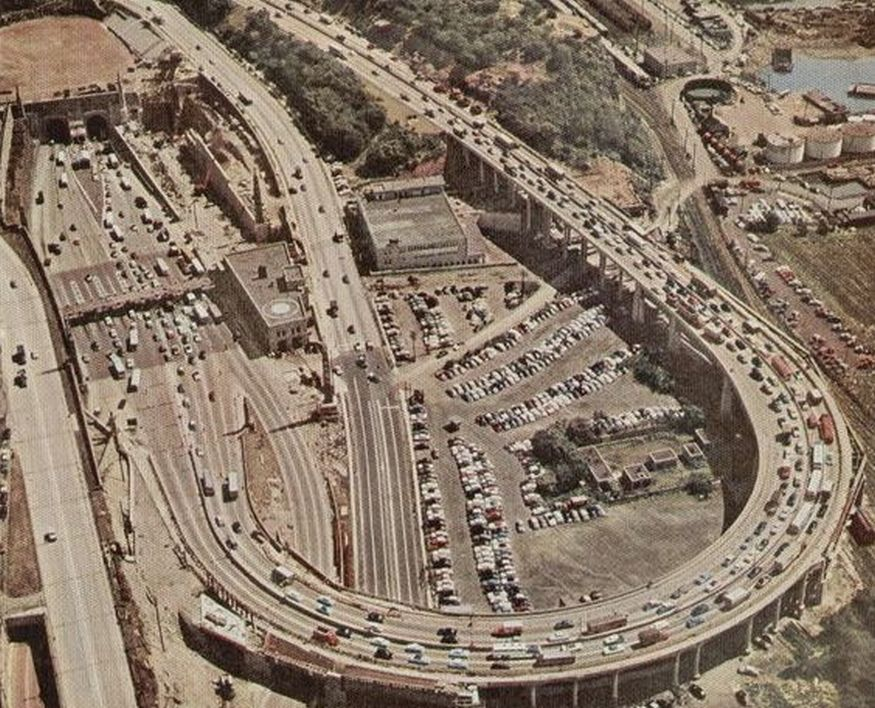
Lincoln Tunnel Helix and Plaza 1955

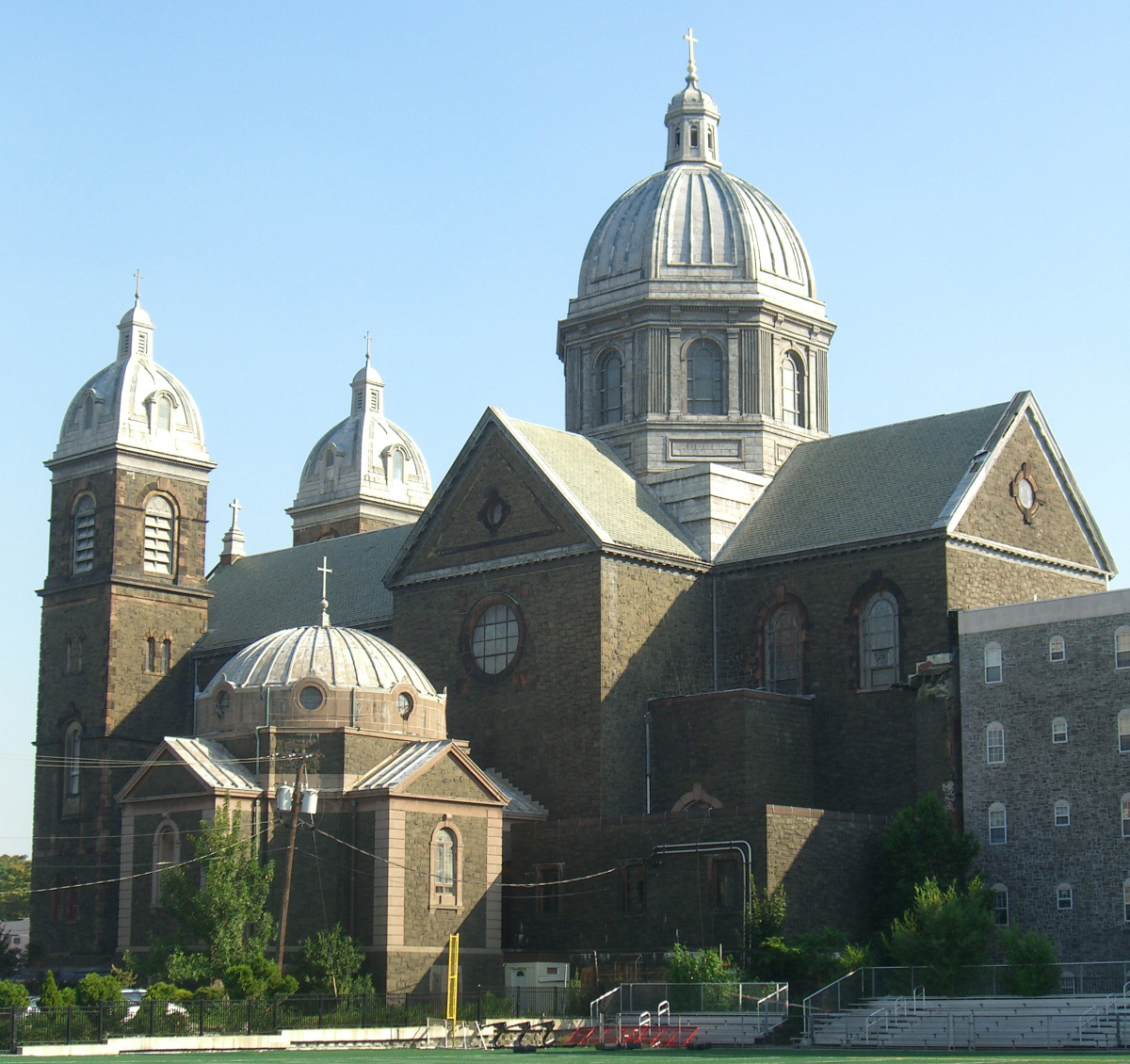
Church of Saint Michael the Archangel

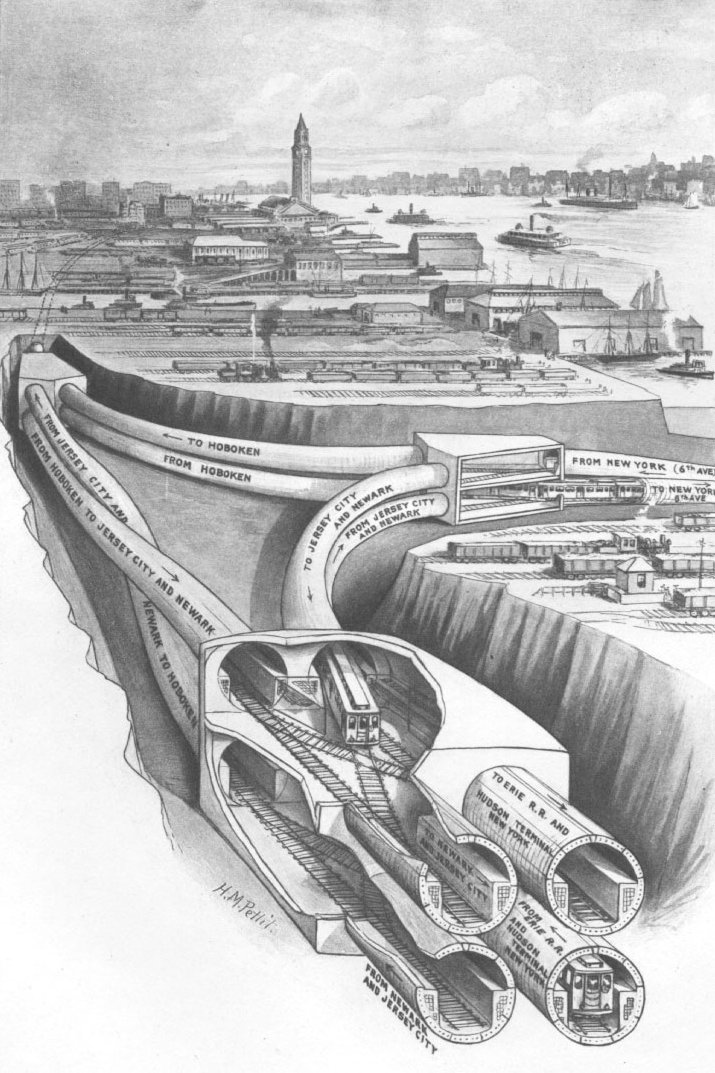
Hudson and Manhattan Tubes

- Bergen Arches
- Bergen Hill
- Bergenline Avenue Commercial Historic District (32nd Street to 48th Street)
- Clark Thread Company Historic District
- Communipaw-Lafayette Historic District
- Castle Point Terrace
- Ellis Island
- Buildings at 1200-1206 Washington Street
- Gregory-Highpoint Historic District
- Hackensack Water Company Complex
- Hamilton Park Historic District
- Harsimus Cove Historic District
- Harsimus Stem Embankment
- Hoboken Historic District
- Holland Tunnel
- Hudson and Manhattan Railroad Uptown Hudson Tubes and Downtown Hudson Tubes
  National Historic Civil Engineering Landmark 1978 by the American Society of Civil Engineers.
- King's Bluff Historic District
- Lincoln Tunnel: Lincoln Tunnel Approach and Helix,
  - Lincoln Tunnel Toll Plaza and Ventilation Buildings
- Lower Bergenline/Broadway Historic District
- Monastery and Church of Saint Michael the Archangel
- North River Tunnels
- Jersey City Medical Center, now the Beacon
- Morris Canal
- North River Tunnels
- Paulus Hook Historic District
- Statue of Liberty National Monument, Ellis Island and Liberty Island
- Shippen Street Double Hairpin at Hackensack Plank Road
- Summit Avenue Commercial Historic District
- Van Vorst Park Historic District
- West Shore Railroad Tunnel (now Bergenline Avenue (HBLR station))
