= Monastery and Church of Saint Michael the Archangel =

Historic church in Union City, New Jersey, United States

- U.S. National Register of Historic Places
- New Jersey Register of Historic Places
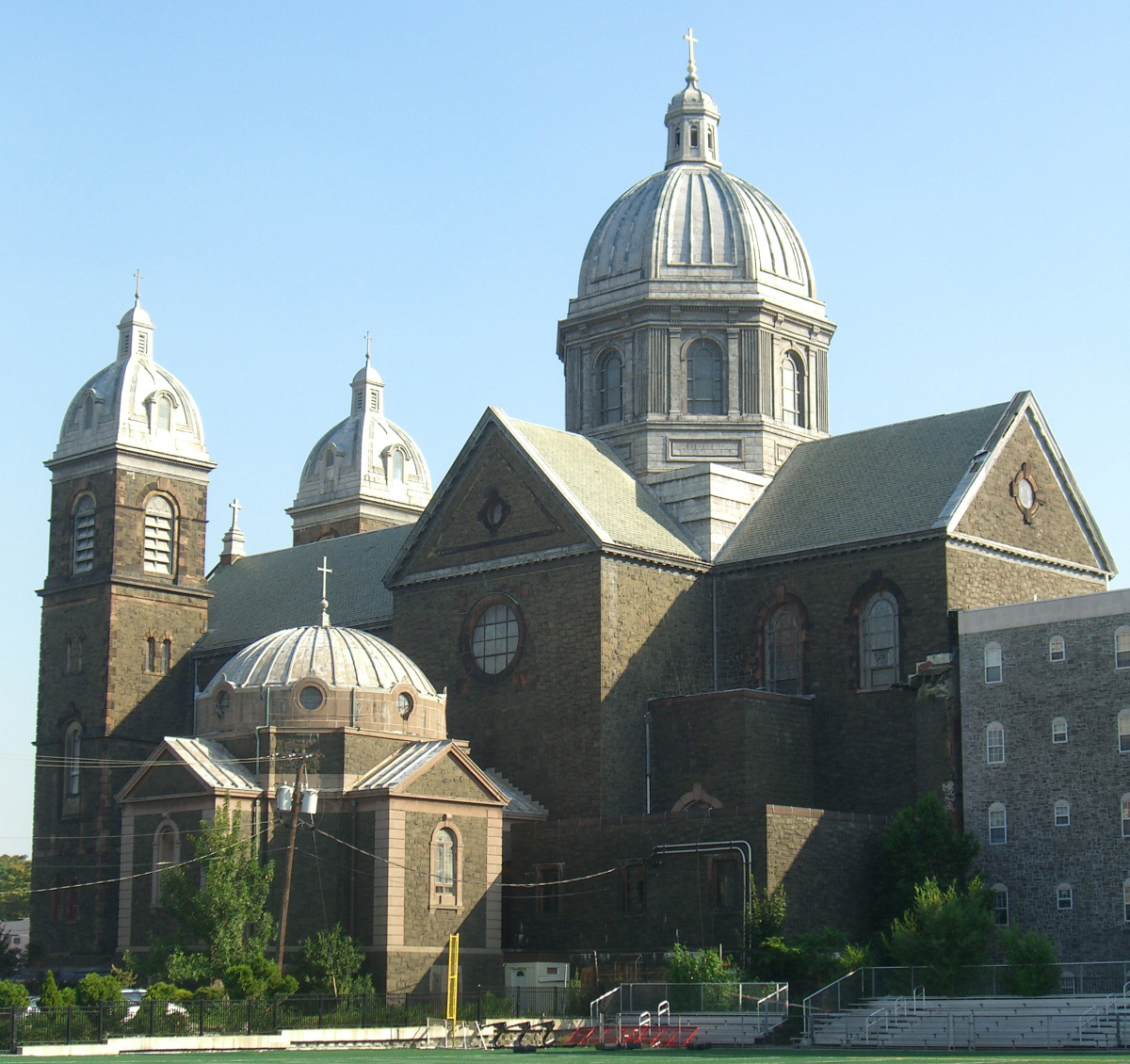

- Location within Hudson County, New Jersey Location within New Jersey Location within the United States
- Location: 2019 West Street; Union City, New Jersey
- Coordinates: 40°45′56″N 74°2′14″W
- Area: 13 acres (5.3 ha)
- Built: 1875
- Architect: Keely, Patrick C.; Et al.
- Architectural style: Second Empire, Italianate
- NRHP reference No.: 86000418
- NJRHP No.: 1547

Significant dates
- Added to NRHP: March 6, 1986
- Designated NJRHP: January 28, 1986

The Monastery and Church of Saint Michael the Archangel, known locally as Saint Michael's Monastery Church, is a state and national historic place in Union City, New Jersey, United States. Formally opened in 1869 and completed in 1875, the grounds of the complex are bounded West Street and Summit Avenue between 18th and 21st Streets. The small street leading to its front entrance from the east is called Monastery Place. At one time the largest Roman Catholic church in Hudson County, it has since become home to a Presbyterian congregation while part of the grounds are used for housing and education. At one time its walls were adorned by artwork by Hildreth Meière, until rain damage prompted their removal from public view.

== History ==
In 1861, Passionists began their ministry in Roman Catholic Archdiocese of Newark, and by 1864 had built a monastery in what was then West Hoboken, on a site bounded by West Street and Summit Avenue, between 18th and 21st Streets. and now southern half of Union City. The land for the 12.3-acre site was donated by J. Kerrigan, the owner of Kerrigan Farm, and the namesake of Kerrigan Avenue.

The monastery that was located on the grounds began operating in 1864. The domed church was designed in 1869 by Irish-American architect Patrick Keely. Its cornerstone was laid in 1869, and it was completed in 1875. It opened its doors later that year. Additions to the complex were made in 1914, 1929, and 1944. In 1934 artist Hildreth Meière was commissioned to create three murals of the patron saints of the church's shrine for its the chapel.

In 1876, the relics of Saint Benedict were enshrined near the main altar. At one time, the church was the largest Roman Catholic house of worship in Hudson County. A 1934 fire—one of the largest ever in North Hudson—completely destroyed its domed section, as well as all three of the Hildreth Meiére murals. The church was rebuilt and reopened the following year, and Meiére was again commissioned to create 14 more murals to hang in the monastery.

The monastery continued to serve the predominantly Irish, German, Italian, and Hispanic community as a local seminary and residence for church clergy. This came to an end beginning in 1980, when the monastery closed, followed by the closure of the entire complex in 1981 as a result of declining parish enrollments, fewer seminarians in classes and the lack of sufficient finances needed to pay for the site's increasing mounting maintenance costs.

Following a 1984 fire, the owners attempted to sell the property, which at the time was the last undeveloped major parcel of land in Union City, to a commercial developer interested in building a shopping center, but the city blocked this endeavor by rezoning the six-square-block site for single-family residential development. In 1983 Saint Michael's Parish merged with nearby Saint Joseph's Parish, whose school and church were on the corner of Central Avenue at 14th Street, becoming Saint Joseph and Michael's Parish. In 1986, the complex was placed on both state and national registers of historic places.

Also in 1986, records for St. Michael's and other nearby parishes were microfilmed by the Genealogical Society of Utah. Also that same year, the monastery and church were sold at a minimal price to a 100-member Korean Presbyterian congregation from Palisades Park, and renamed Hudson Presbyterian Church.

A third fire on August 19, 1994, destroyed a large portion of the monastery building, though the church was undamaged.

The surrounding park grounds, which had been used in the past for sports activities by citizens, were sold. On the southeast portion on 18th Street between West Street and Central Avenue two condominium buildings and a low-to-moderate income housing complex were built, replacing the portion of the monastery destroyed by fire in 1994. In 2002 José Martí Middle School and the southern branch of the Union City Public Library were built on the southern side of the Monastery grounds, on 18th Street. They opened in 2004. When Union City High School opened in 2008, José Martí Middle School converted into an annex for the high school's first-year students, and was `named José Martí Freshman Academy. In 2019, it converted again into José Martí STEM Academy.

In 2014 Preservation New Jersey (PNJ) added the church to its "Ten Most Endangered Historic Places in New Jersey" list, due to the deterioration that had taken place due to the structure's age, and the inability of the Korean Presbyterian congregation that had been using it since 1986, which consists of less than 100 members as of 2011, to raise the money needed to repair it. The church was the fourth site in Union City to be placed on PNJ's list. In addition to the decay that had already suffered by the building by the time the church was purchased in 1984, rain had damaged the artwork by Hildreth Meiére that adorned the walls, which is no longer viewable by the public.

== See also ==
- Blue Chapel
- List of Registered Historic Places in Hudson County, New Jersey
- Historic districts in Hudson County, New Jersey
