= Central Avenue (Hudson Palisades) =

Populated place in Hudson County, New Jersey, US

Coordinates: 40.738°N 74.054°W

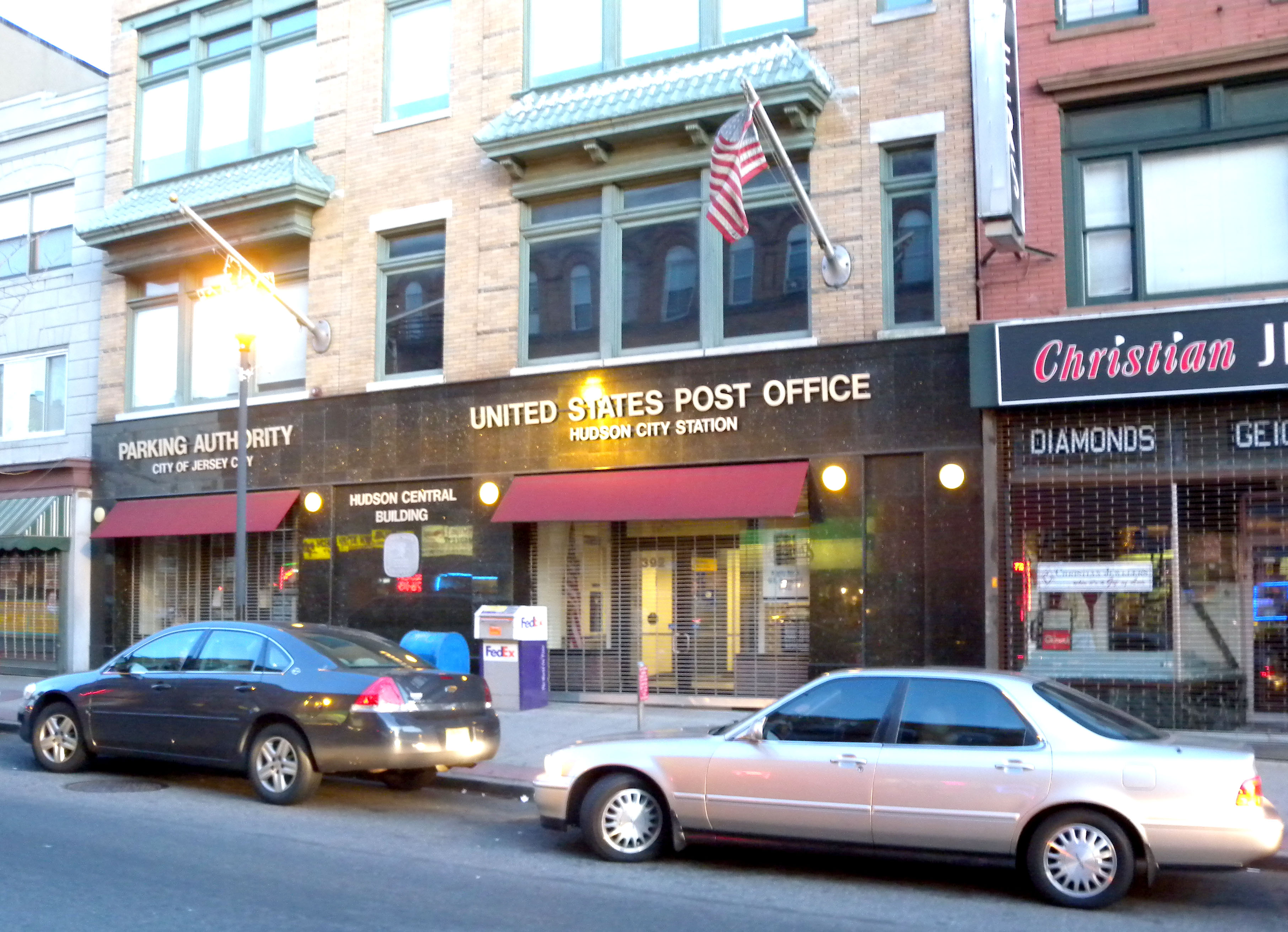
Hudson City Station

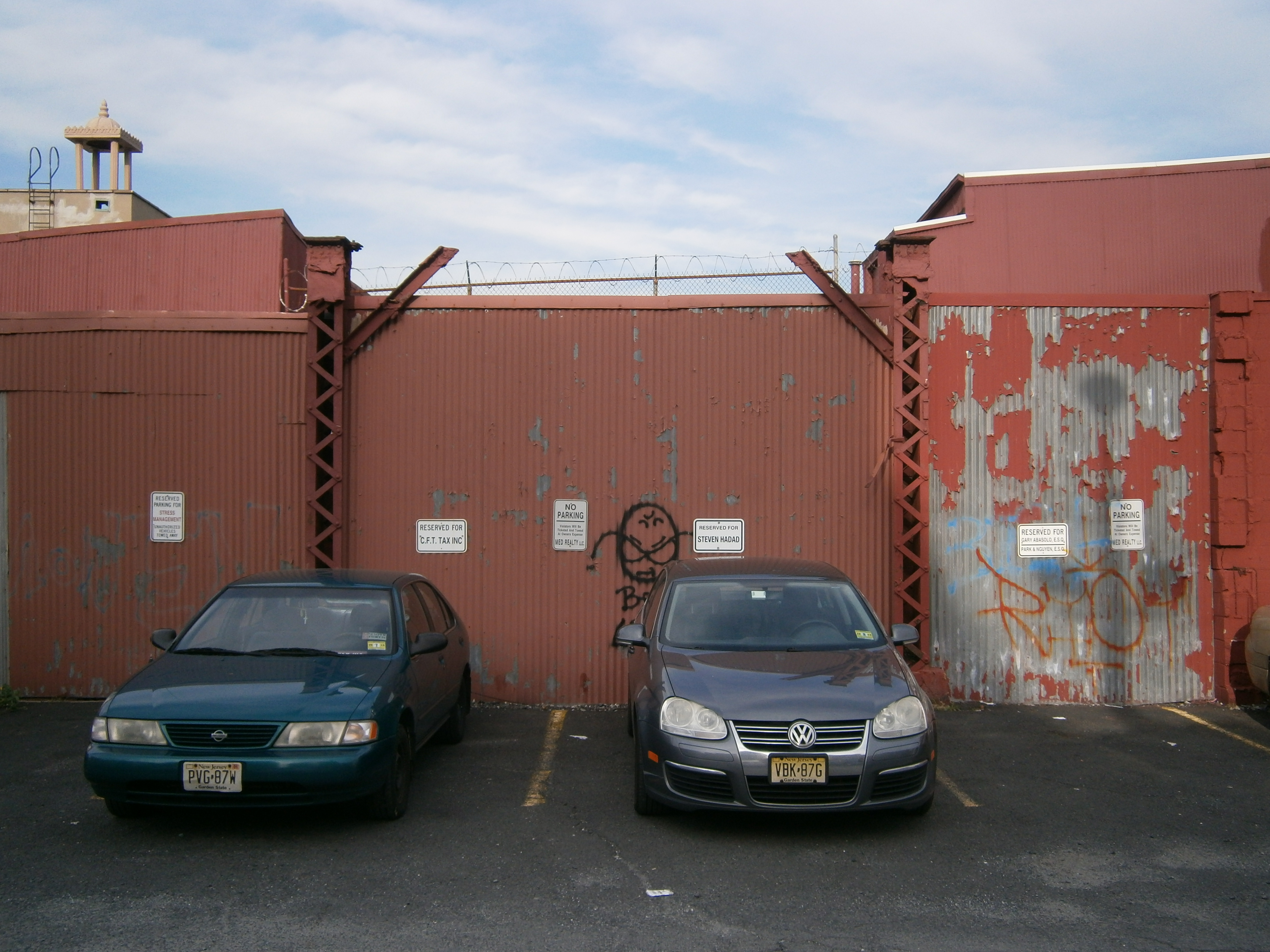
Two posts of a now-demolished Hoboken Elevated trestle that carried elevated streetars over the Bergen Arches, Long Dock Tunnel, and State Highway 139 in Jersey City

Central Avenue is a 12-block-long thoroughfare in the Heights neighborhood of Jersey City, New Jersey, United States. One of 13 shopping districts in the city, it is designated County Route 663 for 1.60-mile (2.57 km) of its length. It originates at the intersection of Summit Avenue and Pavonia Avenue, and runs north, intersecting Newark Avenue one block east of Five Corners to Paterson Plank Road near Transfer Station. The avenue continues north through Union City without the county route designation to 35th Street (CR 674), two blocks north of Hackensack Plank Road.

== History ==
Central Avenue was the "Main Street" of Hudson City, one of the municipalities which elected to join Jersey City in a referendum held in 1863. The avenue begins at what had been the southern border of the town that is now near the county seat of Hudson County and the historic Hudson County Courthouse. Traveling north it almost immediately passes over three man-made ravines, or "cuts" through the part of the Hudson Palisades called Bergen Hill. The now-unused Bergen Arches and the single track Long Dock Tunnel were created for railroads, while The Depressed Highway (the bridge over which was replaced in 2017) was created to allow traffic to by-pass local roads while travelling between the Holland Tunnel and the Pulaski Skyway. In July 2012, the Hudson County Board of Chosen Freeholders passed a resolution to extend the avenue between Hoboken Avenue and Newark Avenue. The work would be done in conjunction with the replacement of the Hudson County Administration Building with a new courthouse. Land for the new building had been acquired by the end of 2017. In September 2018, allocations for design of the site were made, with construction planned for 2020.

== Geography and commerce ==
Central Avenue is one of Jersey City's 13 different neighborhood shopping districts. with more than 240 businesses serving the area. On entering the Heights, it becomes residential for a few blocks, as it passes the Jersey City Reservoir #3 and Pershing Field. Thereafter it becomes a local shopping street. Businesses, retail and food shops are mostly located in three and four story buildings, many built in the late 19th and early 20th century. It again becomes more residential as it approaches the city line in Washington Park.

The trajectory of the avenue is adjusted by a short "dog-leg turn" to the west along Paterson Plank Road and resumes in Union City. It is a broad residential street of multiple family houses and low and mid-rise apartment buildings. At 18th Street, the avenue is once again "interrupted", this time at the grounds of the former Monastery and Church of Saint Michael the Archangel. It continues on the other side and soon thereafter passes over the Lincoln Tunnel Approach and Helix. Central Avenue ends two blocks north of the 32nd Street section of the Hackensack Plank Road near the Holy Family Church complex, which includes the Park Theater, just west of Bergenline Avenue.

== See also ==
County Route 663
- Central Avenue

Route information
- Length: 1.60 mi (2.57 km)

Major junctions
- South end: CR 644 in Jersey City
- NJ 139 in Jersey City
- North end: CR 681 in Jersey City

Location
- Country: United States
- State: New Jersey
- County: Hudson

Highway system
- County Routes in Hudson County; System; 500-series routes
← CR 662	→ CR 664

- Palisade Avenue (Hudson Palisades)
- Hook and Ladder No. 3
