= Hook and Ladder No. 3 =

- U.S. National Register of Historic Places
- New Jersey Register of Historic Places
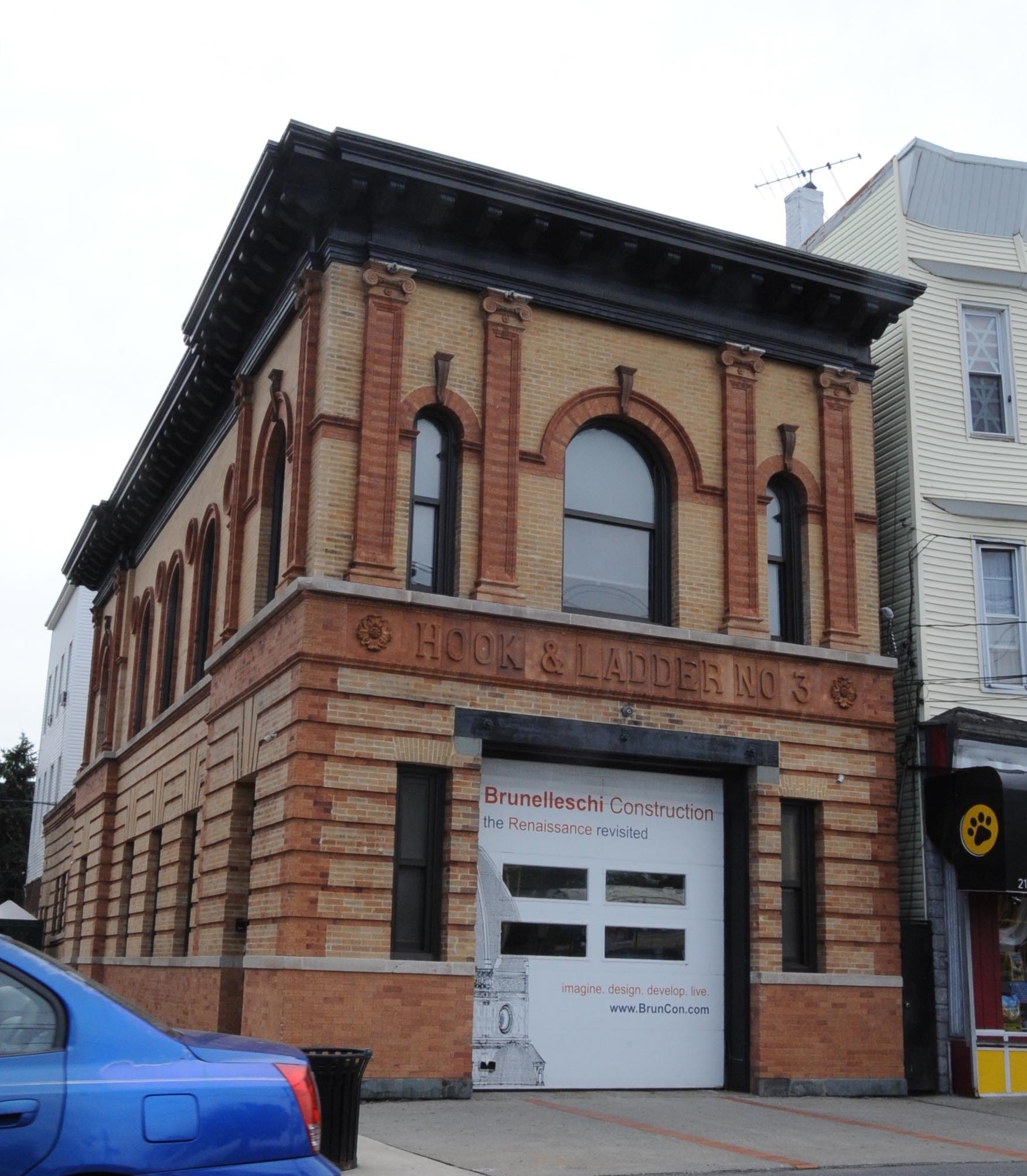

- Location within Hudson County, New Jersey Location within New Jersey Location within the United States
- Location: 218 Central Avenue, Jersey City, New Jersey
- Coordinates: 40°44′31″N 74°3′7″W
- Built: 1896
- Architect: Charles H. Detwiller
- Architectural style: Beaux Arts, Renaissance Revival
- NRHP reference No.: 15000049
- NJRHP No.: 1494

Significant dates
- Added to NRHP: August 24, 2015
- Designated NJRHP: December 29, 2014

Hook and Ladder No. 3 is a historic fire station located at 218 Central Avenue in the Jersey City Heights section of Jersey City in Hudson County, New Jersey. It was added to the National Register of Historic Places on August 24, 2015, for its significance in architecture and politics/government from 1896 to 1964. The fire station was closed in 2005.

== See also ==
- National Register of Historic Places listings in Hudson County, New Jersey
