= The Heights, Jersey City =

Neighborhood in Jersey City, New Jersey, US

Coordinates: 40.747376°N 74.050575°W

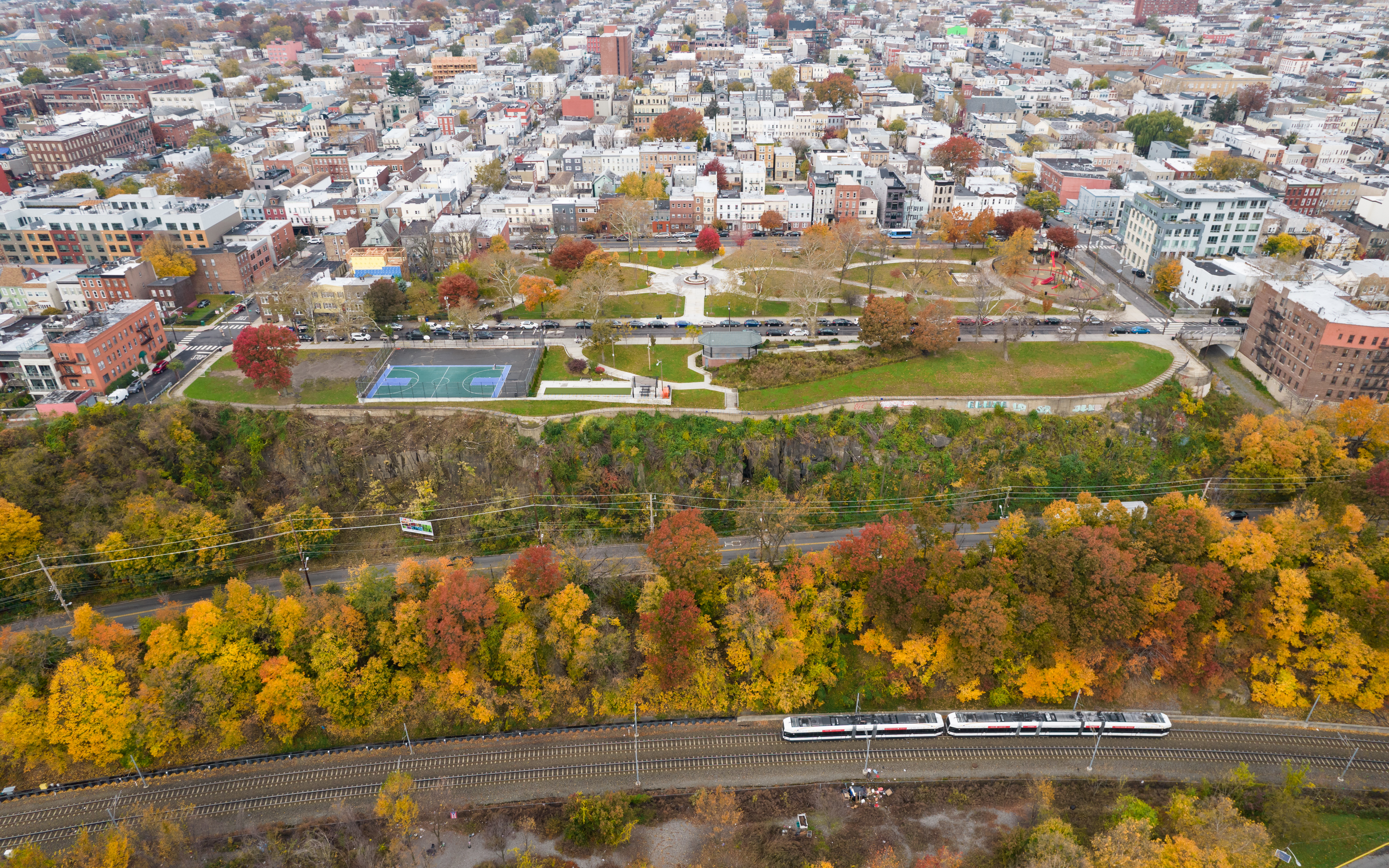
Riverview-Fiske Park and the Heights

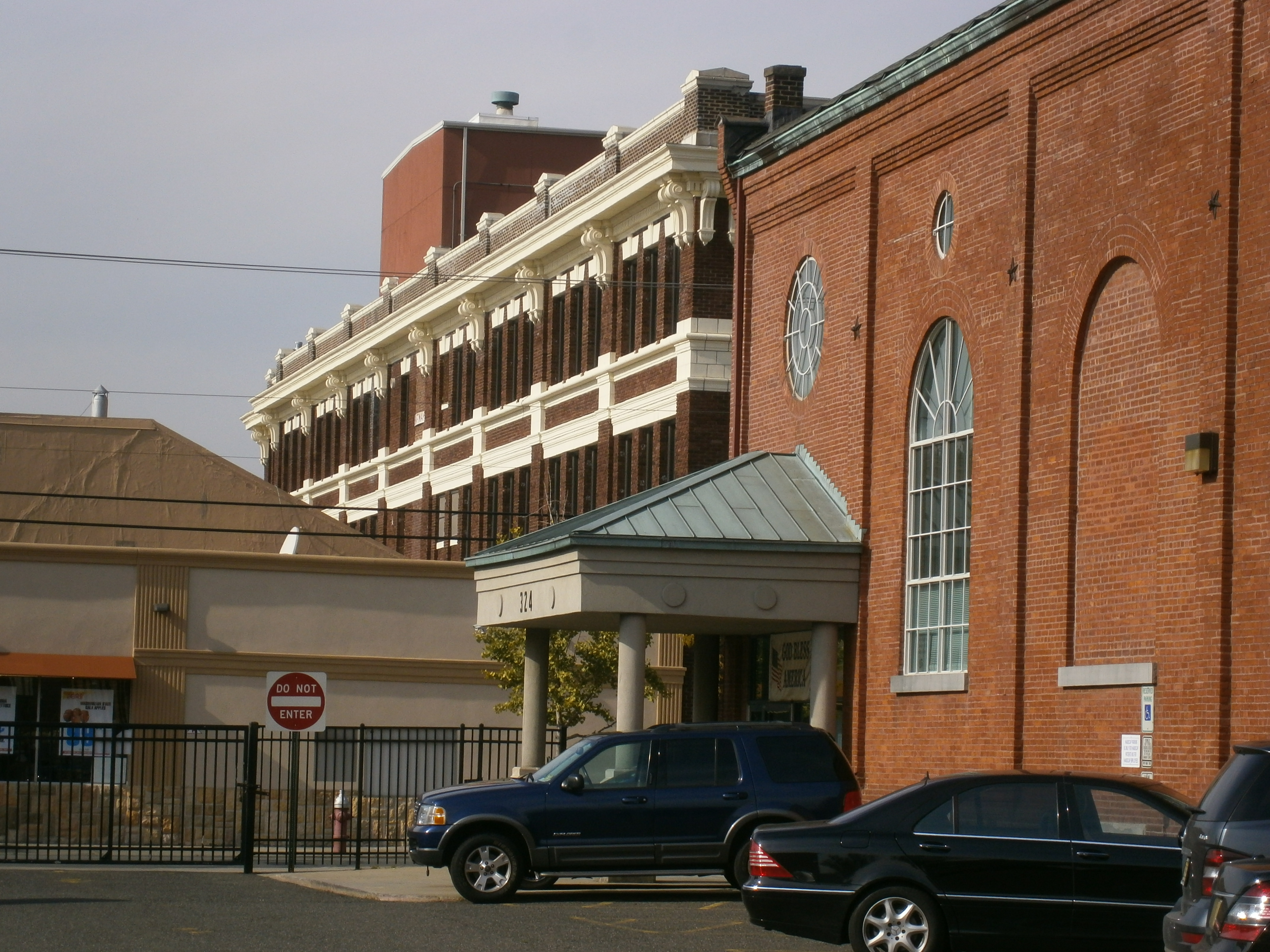
The former Public Service Building at Palisade Avenue and Ferry Street

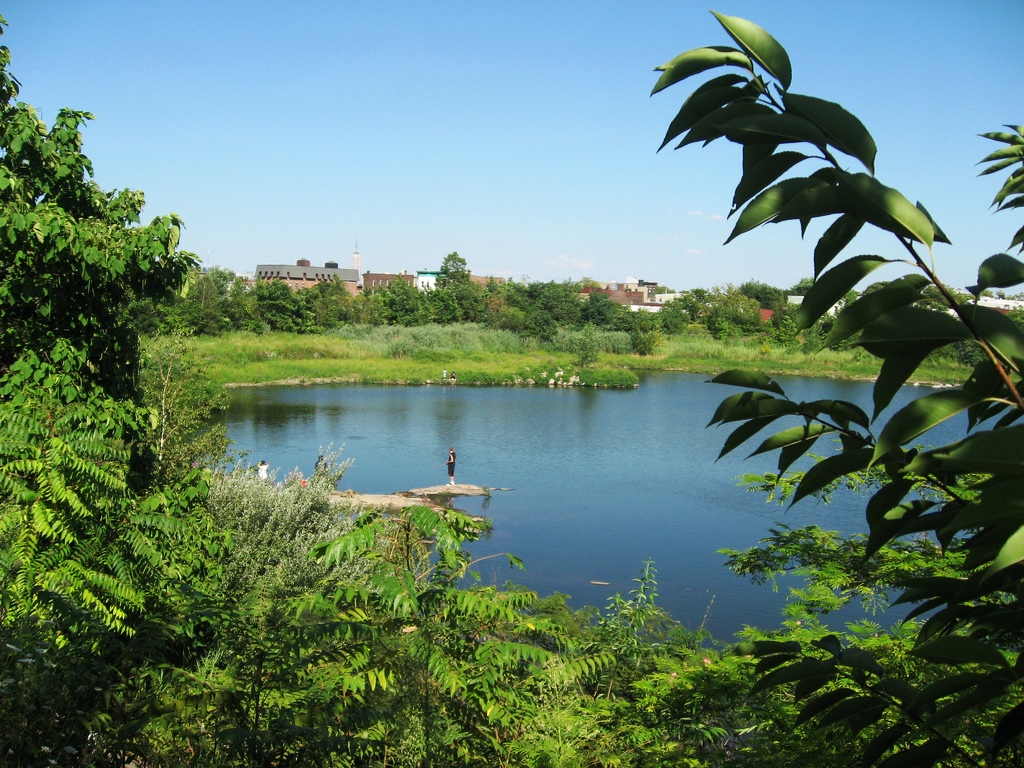
Reservoir #3 adjacent to Pershing Field

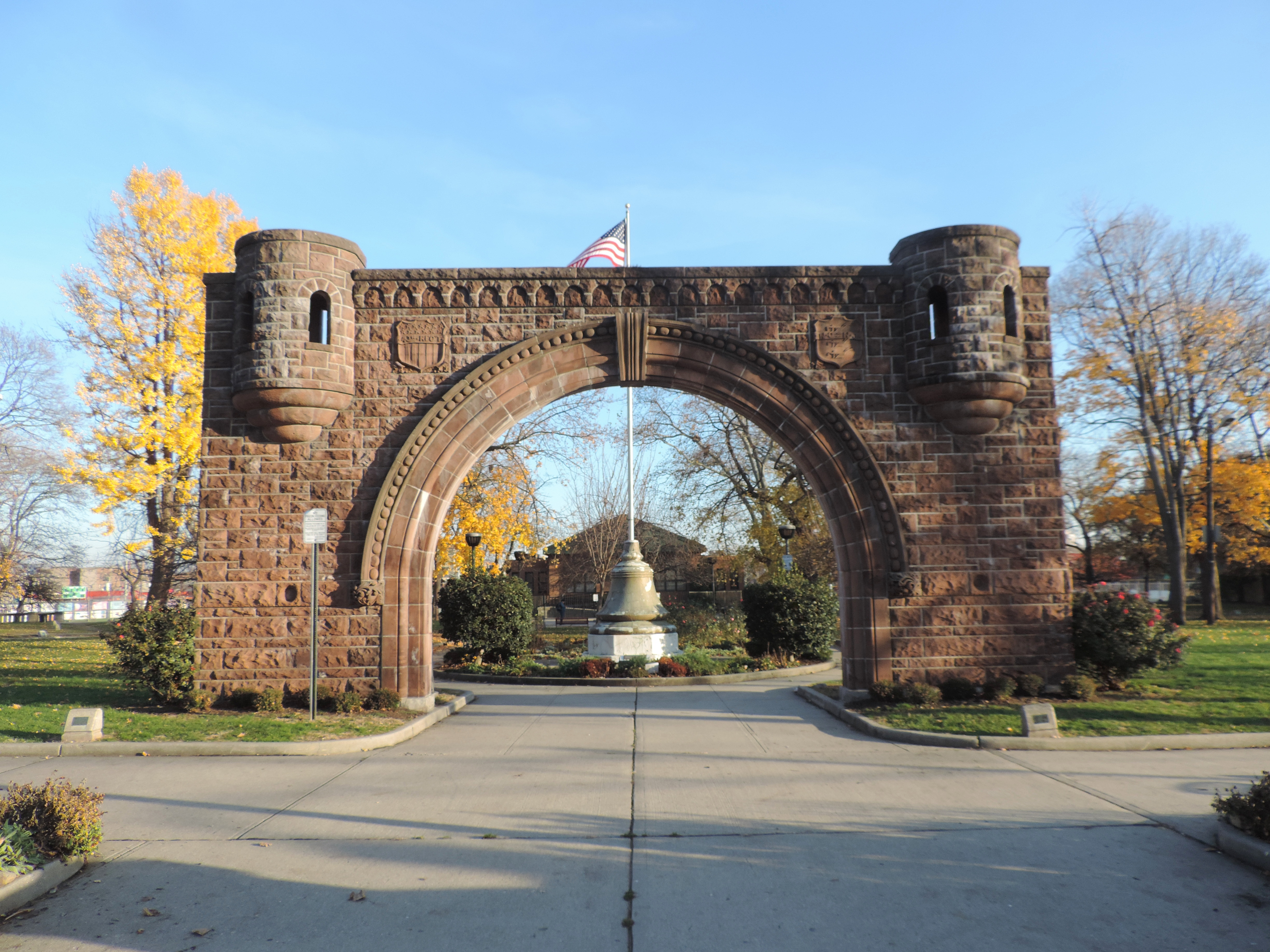
Pershing Field Park entrance

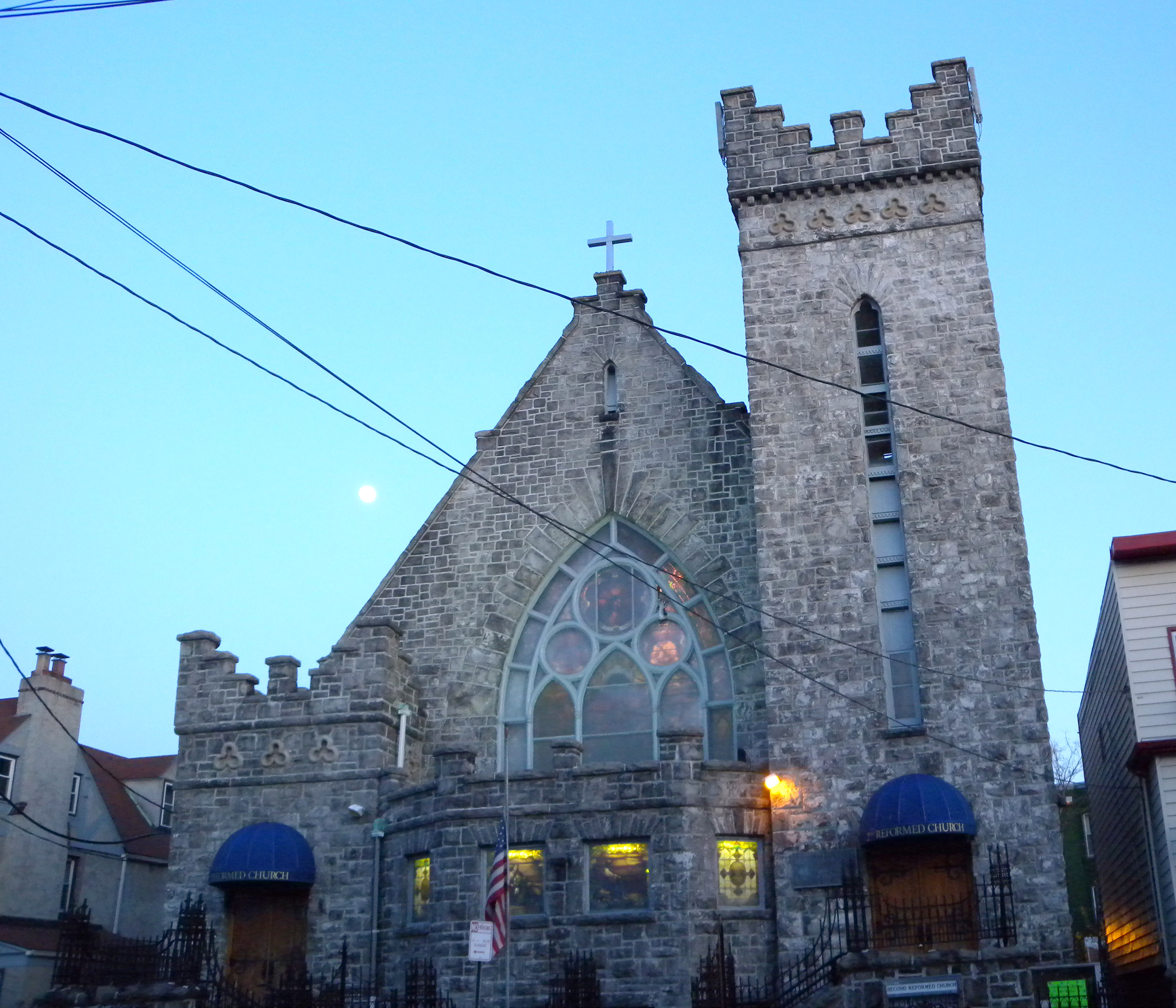
Second Reformed Church, Summit Avenue

The Heights or Jersey City Heights is a neighborhood in Jersey City, New Jersey, located atop the New Jersey Palisades, along the west side of the Hudson River. It is bound by Paterson Plank Road on the north, Highway 139 on the south, Hoboken on the east, and the Hackensack River on the west. and Penhorn Creek on the west. Its postal area ZIP Codes are 07307, and portions of 07306.

== Neighborhoods and thoroughfares ==
Central Avenue is one of Jersey City's 13 different neighborhood shopping districts. with more than 240 businesses serving the area. Pershing Field (named for General John J Pershing) is a memorial park in the center of the district that was built on a military training ground. It offers a green space, baseball fields, a swimming pool and ice-skating rink. The adjacent Jersey City Reservoir No. 3 has been preserved as a state designated wetland and park. Many stately Victorian and Edwardian homes distinguish the Heights, particularly along Summit Avenue and Sherman Place.

== Transportation ==
An elevator at Congress Street and Paterson Plank Road descends to the 9th Street-Congress Street station of the Hudson-Bergen Light Rail. Mountain Ave and New York Ave are among the streets that run through the area.

== History ==
The Heights was part of the colony of Pavonia, New Netherland, the superintendent of which was the American patriarch of the Van Vorst family. A Van Vorst House built in 1742 by the family (now on Palisade Avenue) is considered to be the oldest building in Hudson County. Summit Avenue, slightly to the west follows an Hackensack Indian trail that became the main road from the villages of Communipaw and Bergen and eventually connected to the Paterson and Hackensack Plank Roads.

E.R.V Wright was the first Mayor of Hudson City.

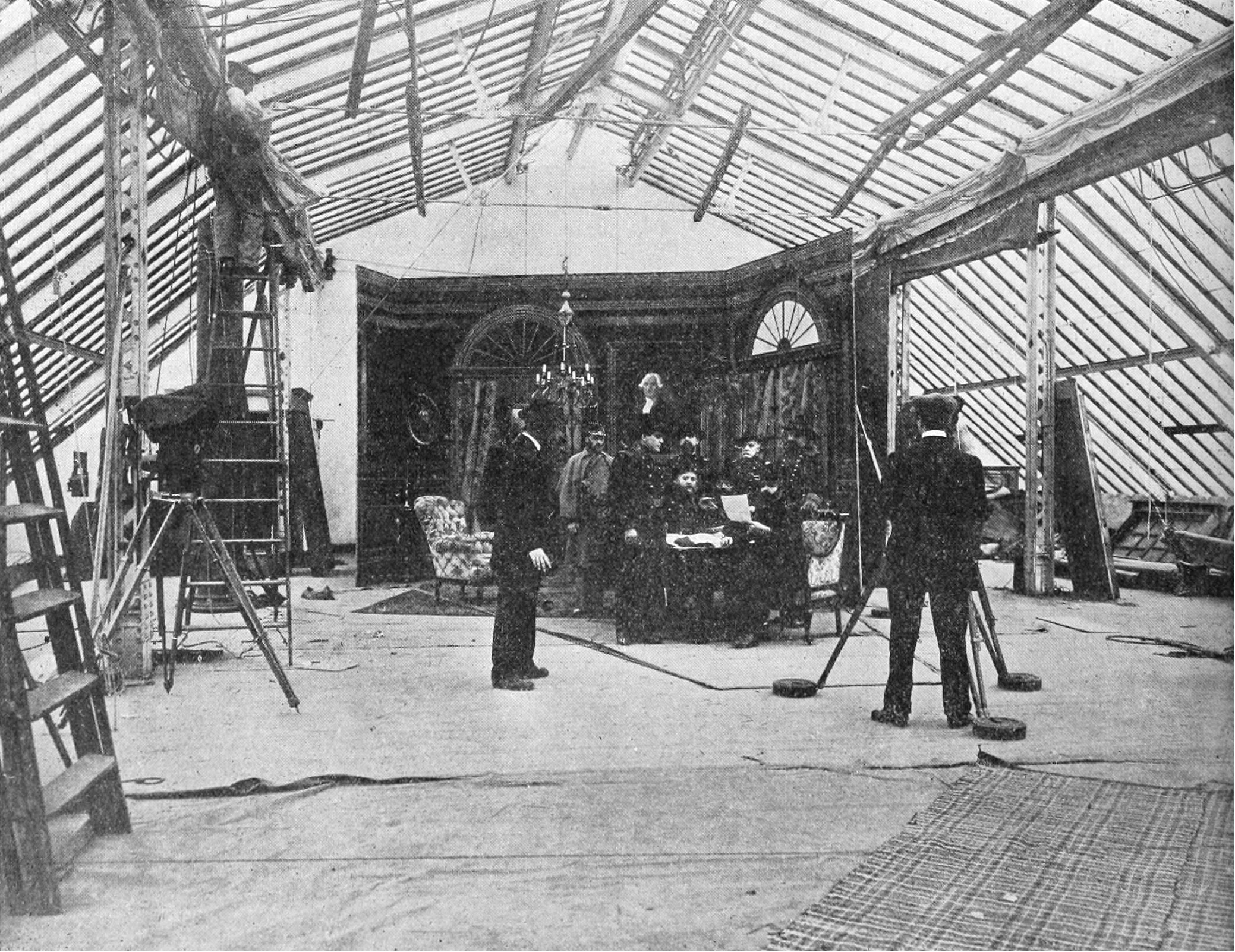
Filming at the Pathé American studio in Jersey City Heights (1912)

In the early 20th century, before Hollywood, the American motion picture industry was mainly based in New Jersey towns along the Hudson River. Chief among them was Fort Lee, which was the nation's first motion picture capital, with other early film studios headquartered in neighboring towns such as Jersey City. Among those was a branch of the French company Pathé, the largest film equipment and production company in the world, whose American factory and studio facility was in established in the Heights in 1910, in a building that still overlooks Paterson Plank Road. Pathé also established the subsidiary Eclectic Film Company, as a distributor for both its American and European product. Although the Jersey City plant produced moderately popular comedies, dramas, and newsreels largely directed at the US market, Perils of Pauline was the first American-made Pathé effort to achieve worldwide success under the Eclectic banner.

== Education ==
Jersey City Public Schools operates public schools in the Heights.

The Roman Catholic Archdiocese of Newark operates area Catholic Schools. St. Anne School was located in Jersey City Heights, and opened in 1904. Its enrollment declined by 33 in 2011 and increased by 22 in 2012. James Carroll, a member of the Jersey City Police Department and a member of the school board, Carroll stated that the 2011 decline was due to parents being afraid that the school would close. In 2011, the archdiocese considered closing the school, but a fundraising generated sufficient money to keep it open. It closed in 2012. That year the building housed the K-8 grades of the Hoboken Charter School on a temporary basis as the regular K-8 building of the charter school was badly damaged by a fire.

== See also ==
- National Register of Historic Places listings in Hudson County, New Jersey
- List of neighborhoods in Jersey City, New Jersey
- Washington Park
- Long Dock Tunnel
- White Manna
- Kennedy Boulevard

== Gallery ==
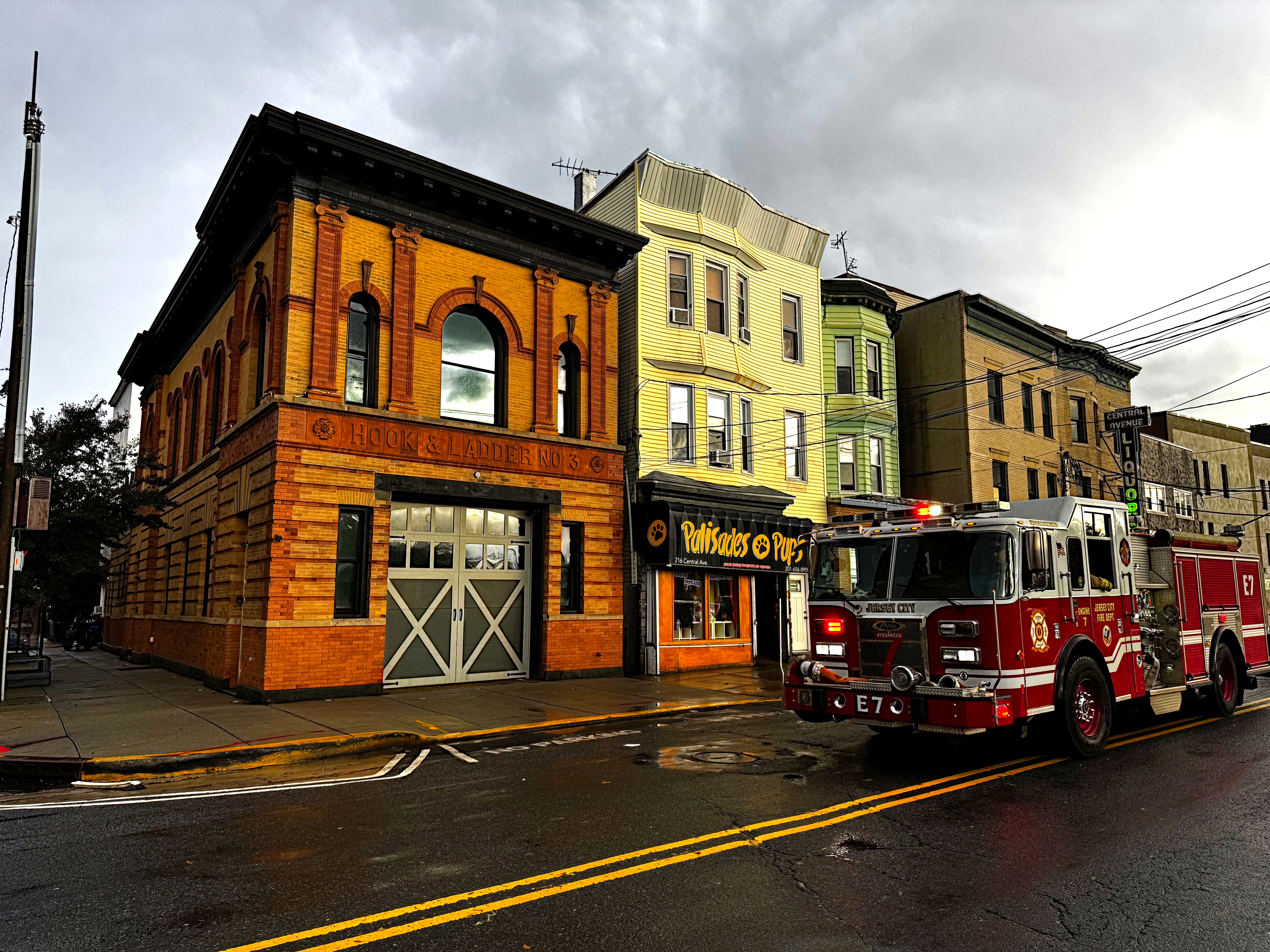
Hook and Ladder No. 3

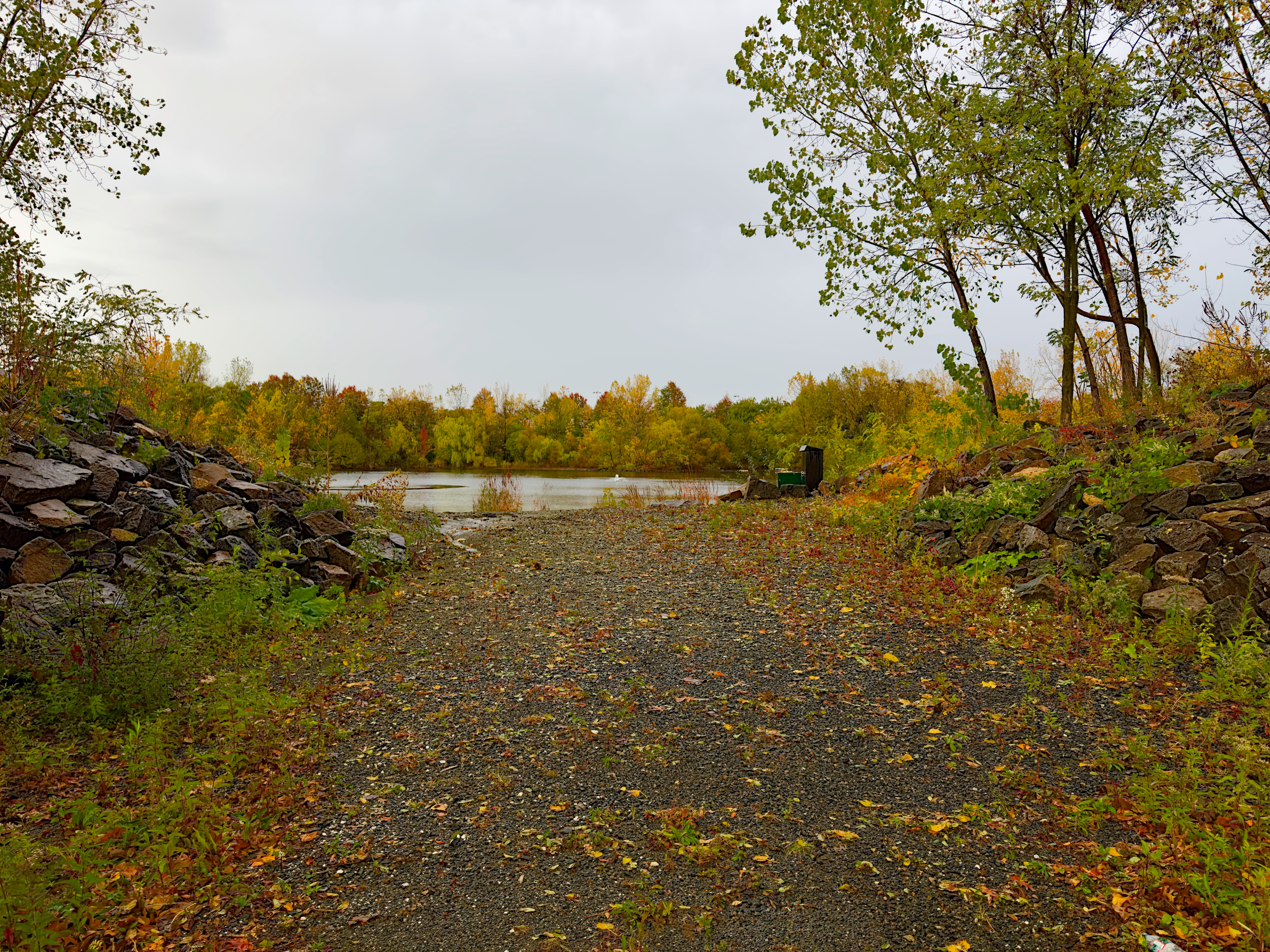
Jersey City Reservoir No. 3

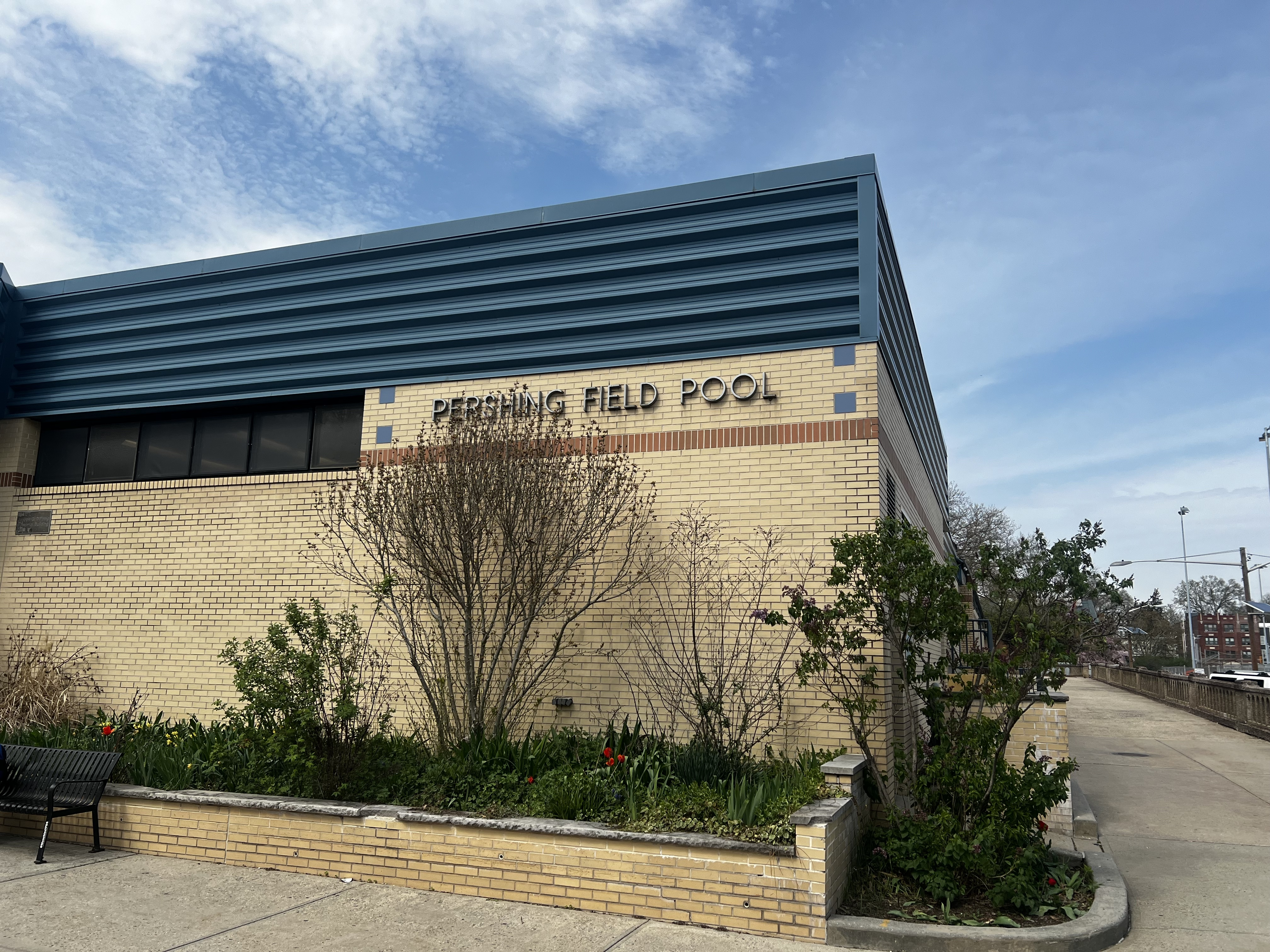
Pershing Field Pool
