= Jersey City Reservoir No. 3 =

Decommissioned reservoir in Jersey City, New Jersey, United States

- Jersey City Reservoir 2 and 3
- U.S. National Register of Historic Places
- New Jersey Register of Historic Places
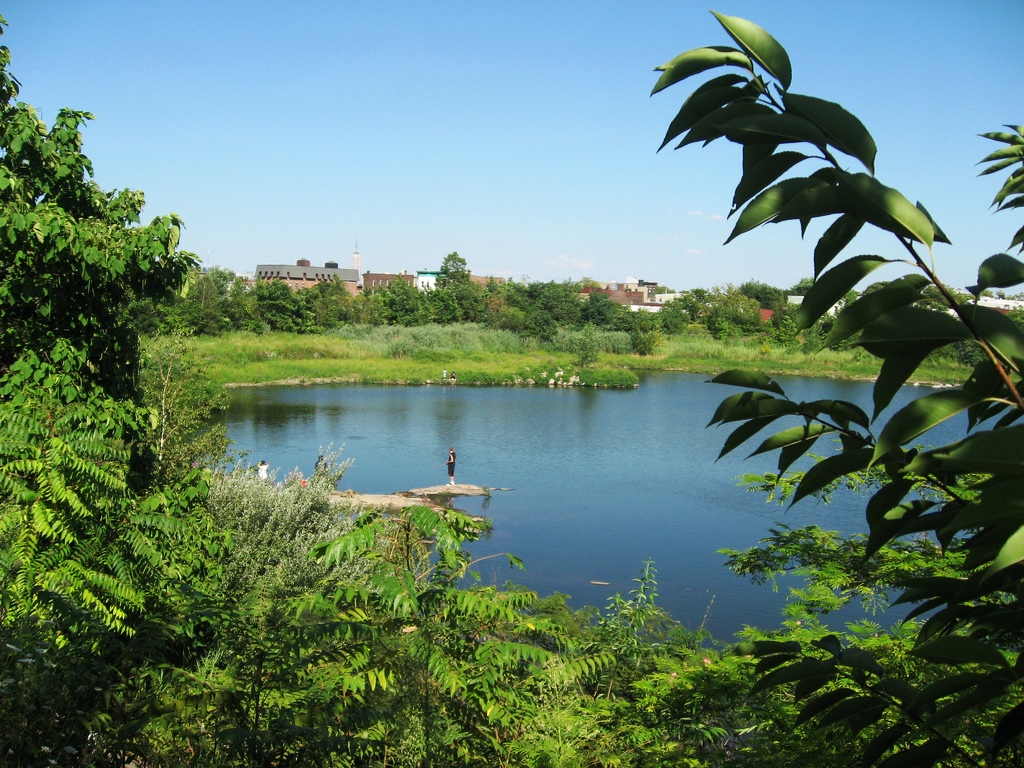

- Location within Hudson County, New Jersey Location within New Jersey Location within the United States
- Location: Central Avenue & Summit Avenue; Jersey City, New Jersey, USA
- Coordinates: 40.7402°N 74.0546°W
- Area: 13.8 acres (5.6 ha)
- Built: 1870
- Architectural style: Egyptian Revival; Romanesque Revival
- NRHP reference No.: 12000569
- NJRHP No.: 1512

Significant dates
- Added to NRHP: August 27, 2012
- Designated NJRHP: April 10, 2012

Jersey City Reservoir No. 3 is a decommissioned reservoir atop Bergen Hill in the Heights of Jersey City, Hudson County, New Jersey, United States, situated on approximately 13.8 acres (5.6 ha) just south of Pershing Field. It was built between 1871 and 1874 as part of the city's waterworks system designed to provide potable water to the city, including Ellis Island. Its perimeter wall is in the Egyptian Revival style and pump stations are in the Romanesque Revival style. The reservoir provided drinking water until the 1980s, when it was drained and abandoned for a larger reservoir at the Boonton Gorge. Since that time, a mini-ecosystem has taken root behind the thick, 20-foot tall stone walls: trees, wildflowers, swans, great blue heron, peregrine falcons, and at the center a 6 acres (2.4 ha) lake. This urban wildlife preserve hosts numerous animal and plant species not otherwise found in an urban environment. It was listed on the state and the federal registers of historic places in 2012. Nearby Reservoir No. 1 was located on either side of Summit Avenue and has been demolished. The reservoir reopened on September 17, 2024; the only entrance is on Howie Fink Wy in the middle of the block.

The Jersey City Reservoir Preservation Alliance, started in 2002, used to run the maintenance and supervision programs necessary to keep the park open to the public every Saturday from May–October. The Alliance also ran summertime programming in arts, music, and recreation to bring new and returning community members to the space. The reservoir is also available for educational visits. The Alliance received the Ted Conrad “Preservationist of the Year” Award in 2005.

As of Spring 2025 the site is under supervision of the Jersey City Dept of Recreation & Youth Development. The preserve is open 7 days a week dependent upon pathway conditions and weather. General hours are 8am-6pm and shift with seasonal daylight. No bikes allowed, no fishing allowed. Access is only to the perimeter top pathway.

== Renovation ==
Renovations to the reservoir had been on-going since ground broke on April 21, 2021. The project encountered several setbacks, including the discovery of contaminated soil and resistance from preservationists. A bridge allowing for public access started construction in 2024 called the Jefferson Avenue walkway bridge. The reservoir reopened to the public on September 17, 2024. The only entrance is on Howie Fink Wy.

== See also ==
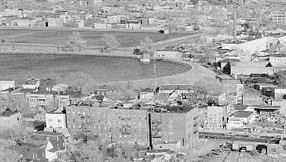
Reservoir No.1 (foreground, and since demolished) and Reservoir No.3

- Hackensack Water Company Complex
- National Register of Historic Places listings in Hudson County, New Jersey
- Jersey City Reservoir Preservation Alliance

== Gallery ==
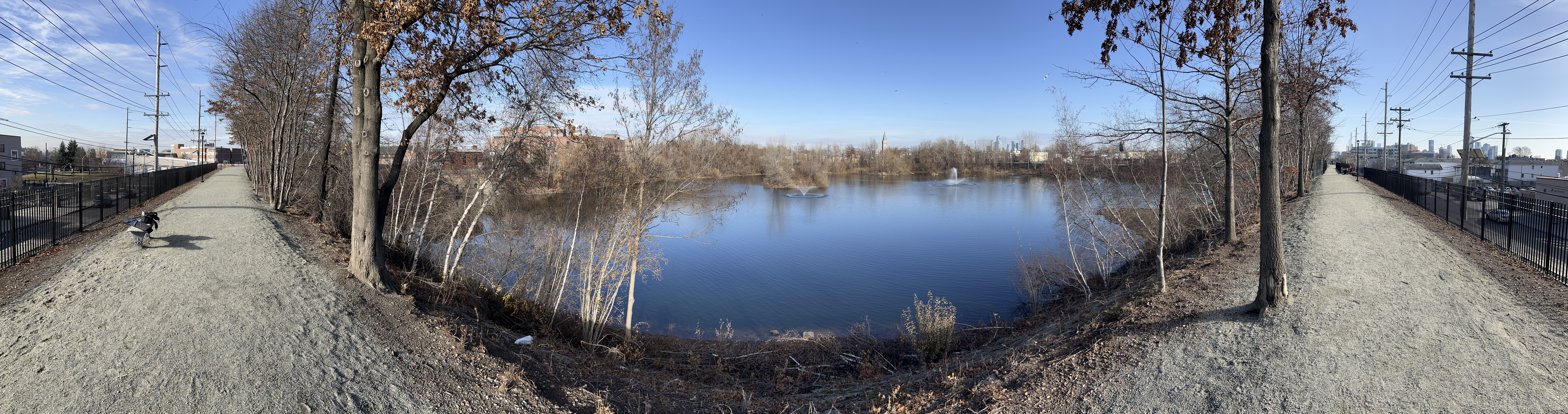
Panoramic view

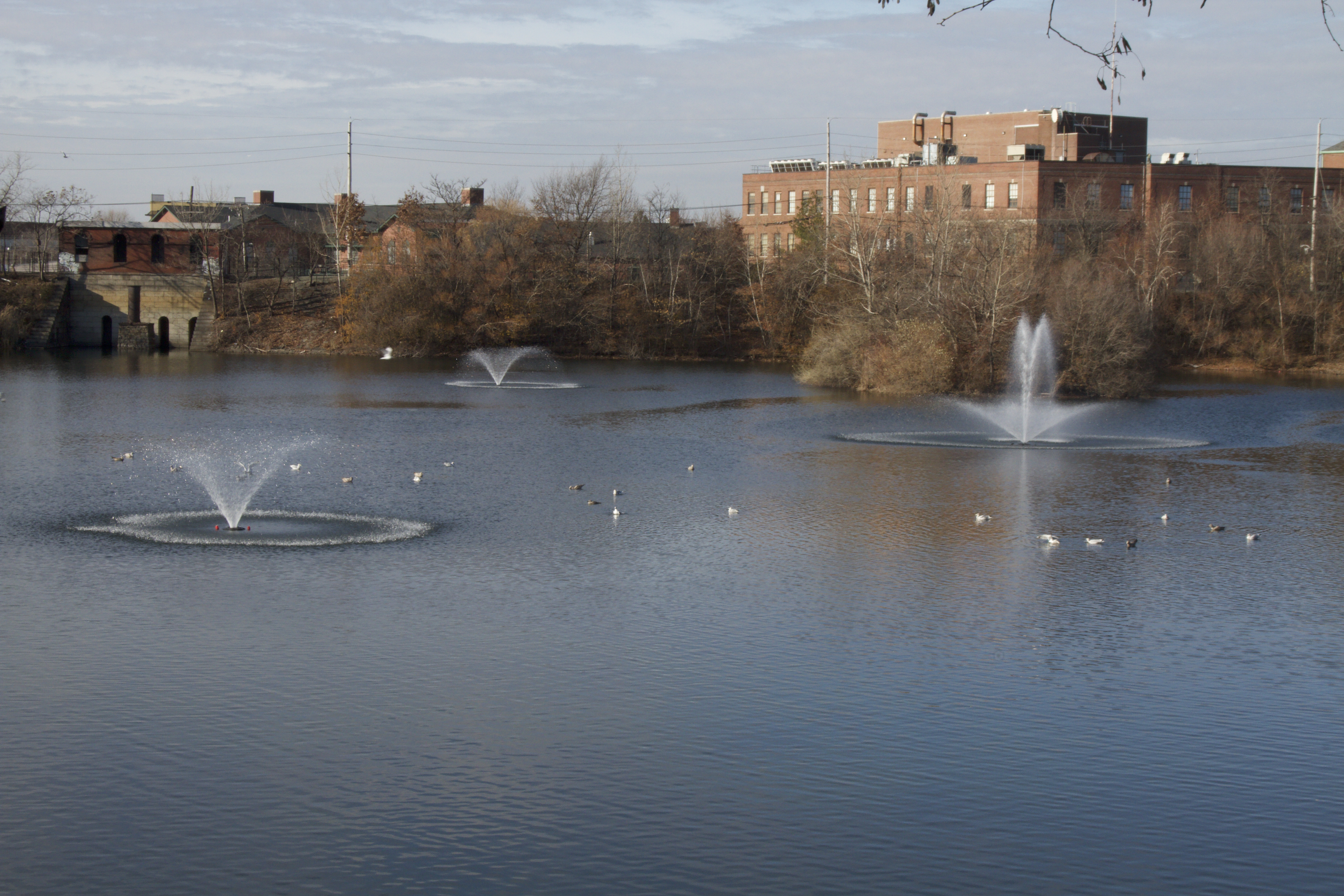
Water Fountains

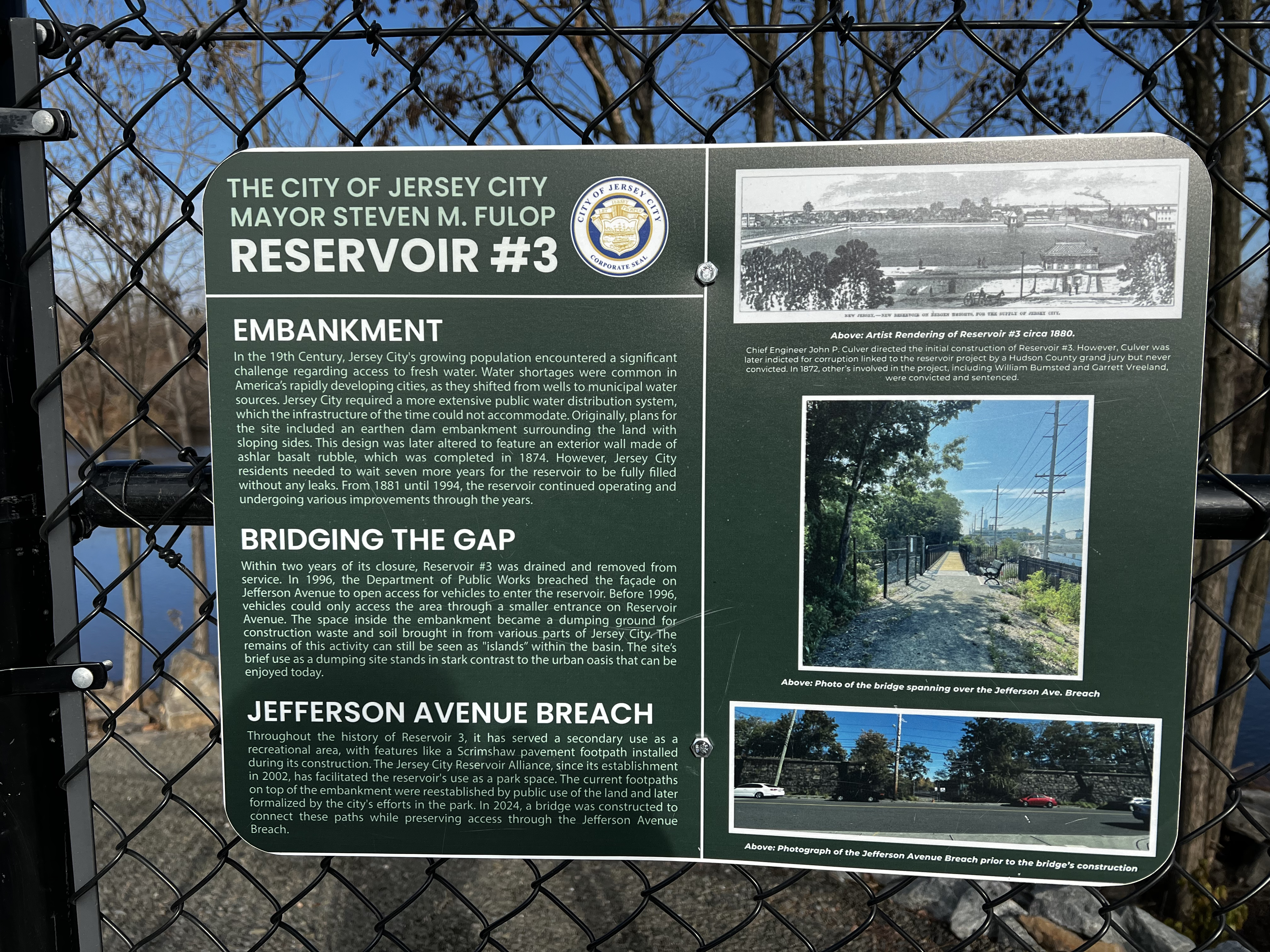
Sign

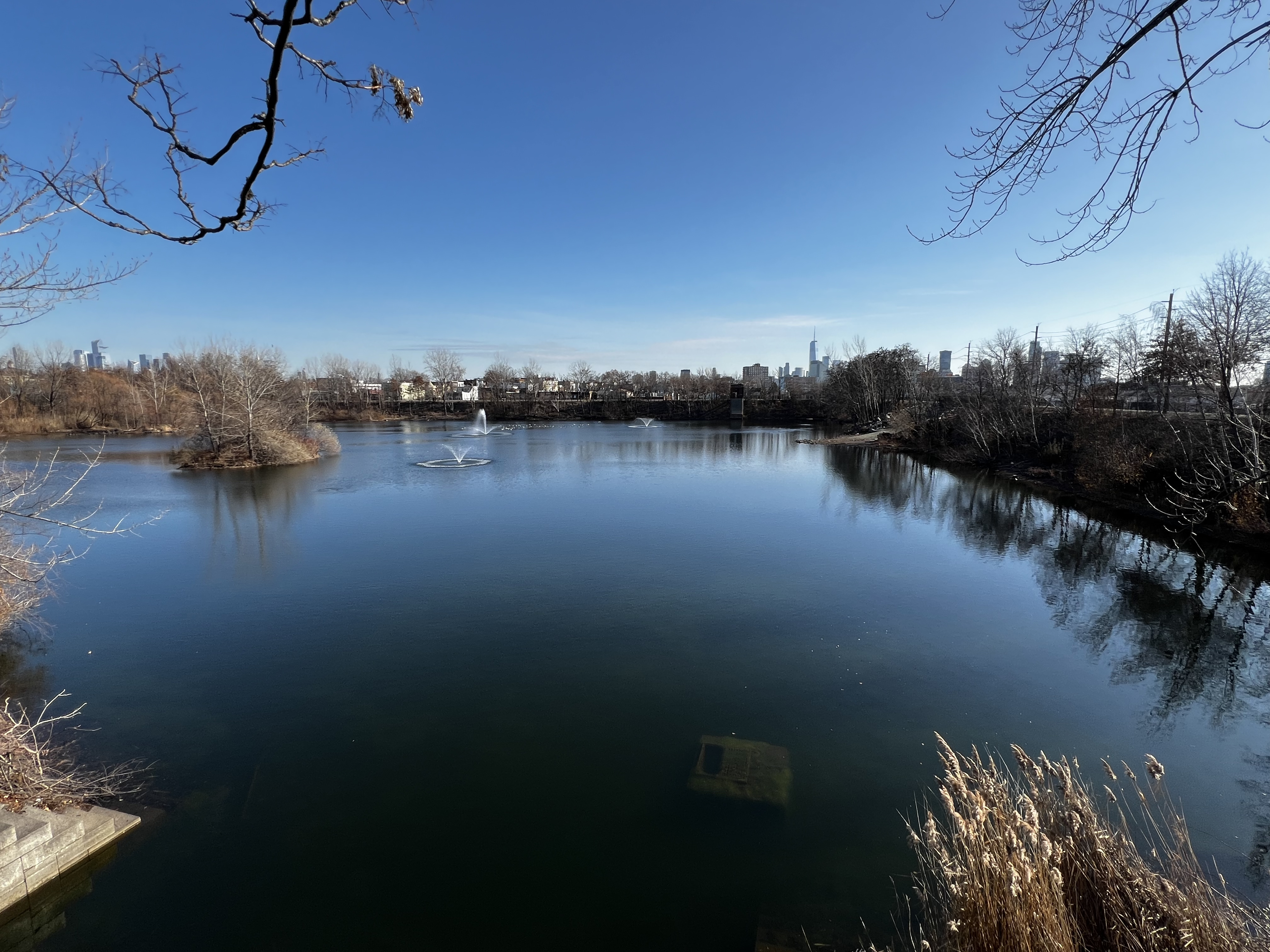
View of Reserve

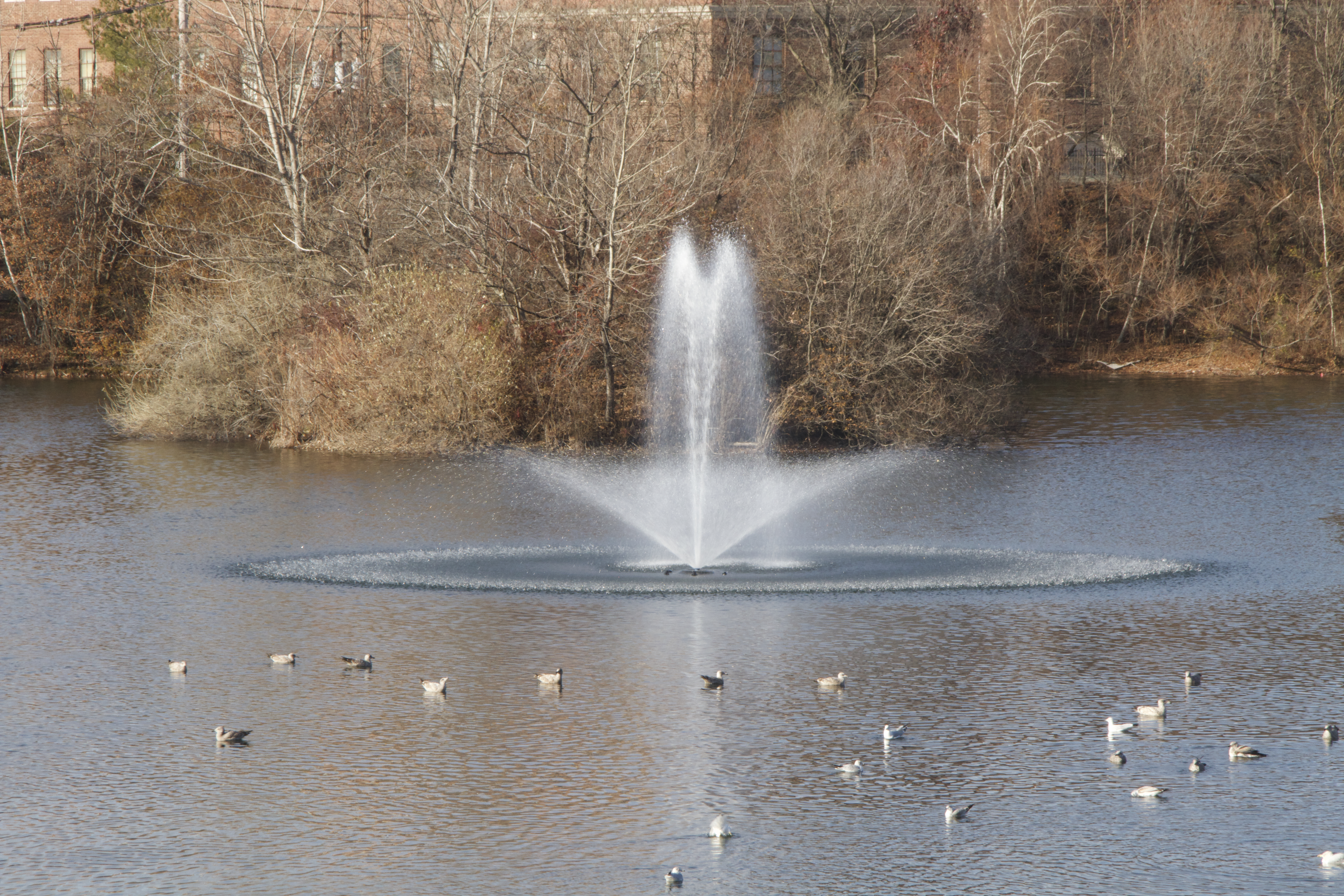
Water Fountain

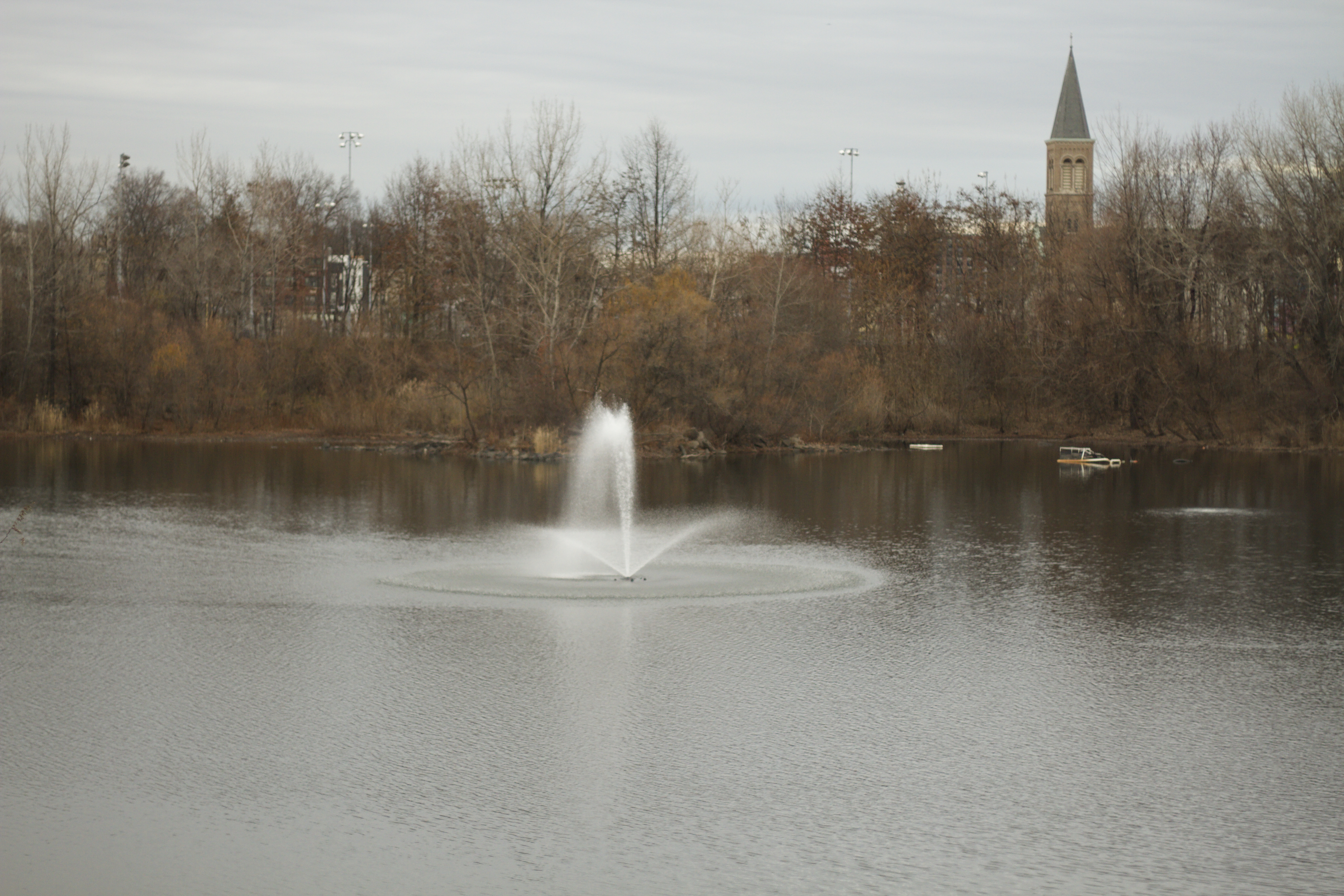
Water Fountain

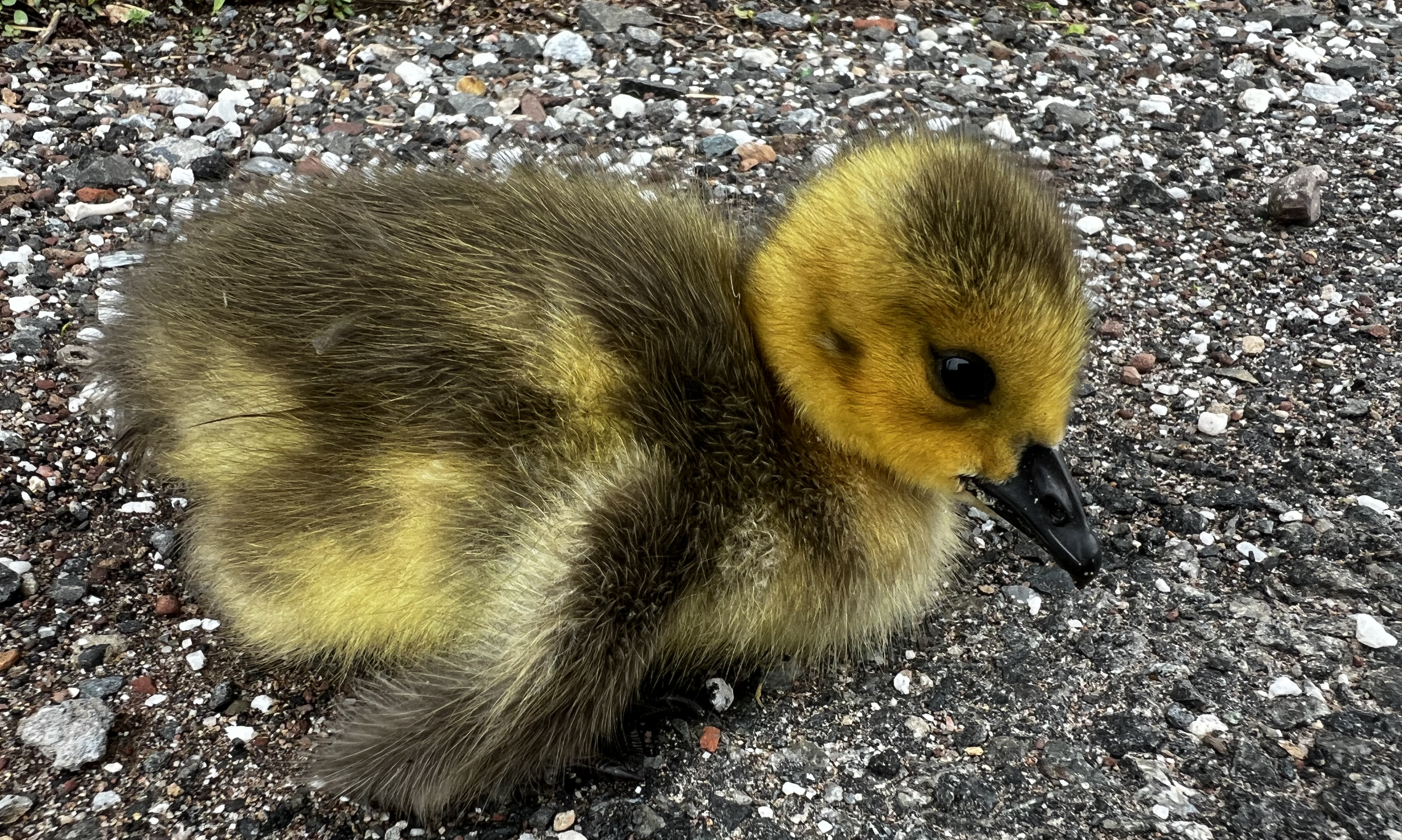
Canadian Gosling
