= Summit Avenue (Hudson Palisades) =

Road in Hudson County, New Jersey, US

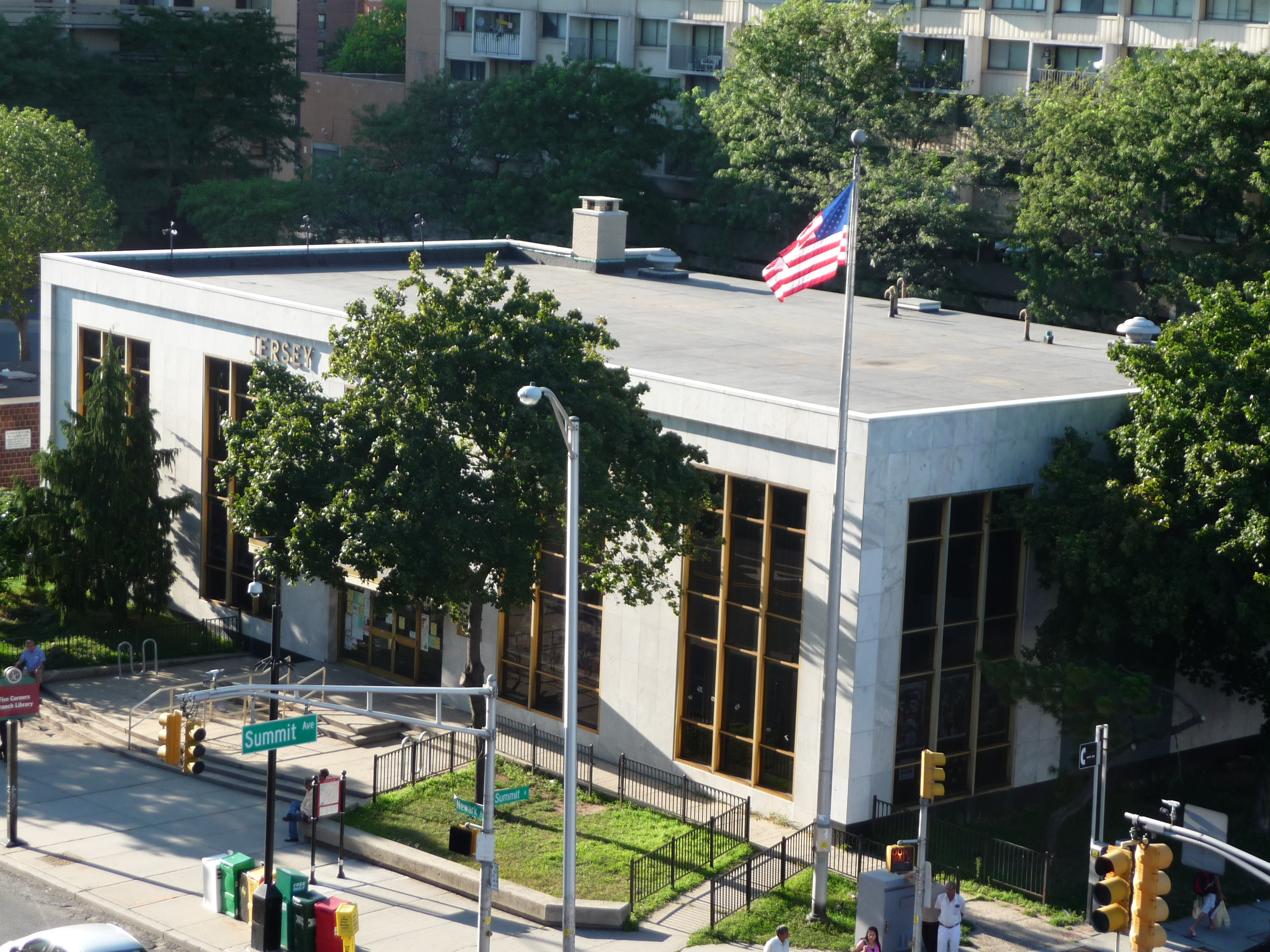
- The Five Corners Branch Library in on Summit Avenue in Jersey City
- Interactive map of Summit Avenue
- Part of: CR 617
- Length: 4.55 mi (7.32 km)
- Location: Hudson County, New Jersey
- Coordinates: 40.77440°N 74.03128°W
- South end: CR 622 in Jersey City
- Major junctions: Route 139 in Jersey City; Route 495 in Union City
- North end: CR 691 in Union City

County Route 617 is 4.55-mile (7.32 km) long and follows one street, Summit Avenue along the ridge of the Hudson Palisades in Hudson County, New Jersey. Its southern end is CR 622, or Grand Street, at Communipaw Junction in the Bergen-Lafayette Section of Jersey City (although Summit Avenue continues one block south to Garfield and Communipaw Avenues without county maintenance). Its northern end is CR 691, 32nd Street, a section of the Bergen Turnpike, in Union City.

== History ==
The route of the avenue follows a Lenape trail, used by the Hackensack Indians between their summer encampment at Communipaw on the Upper New York Bay and a more permanent settlement at Overpeck Creek. In the 17th century it was also used by early European settlers to region, first at Pavonia and later Bergen, that was part of the provincial colony of New Netherland. The ferry landing (nearby the present site of Liberty Science Center), was used by village on the bay as well the one on the hill (at today's Bergen Square) to travel to New Amsterdam. The trail continued north through Bergen Woods before descending and crossing the Hackensack Meadows.

== Route description ==
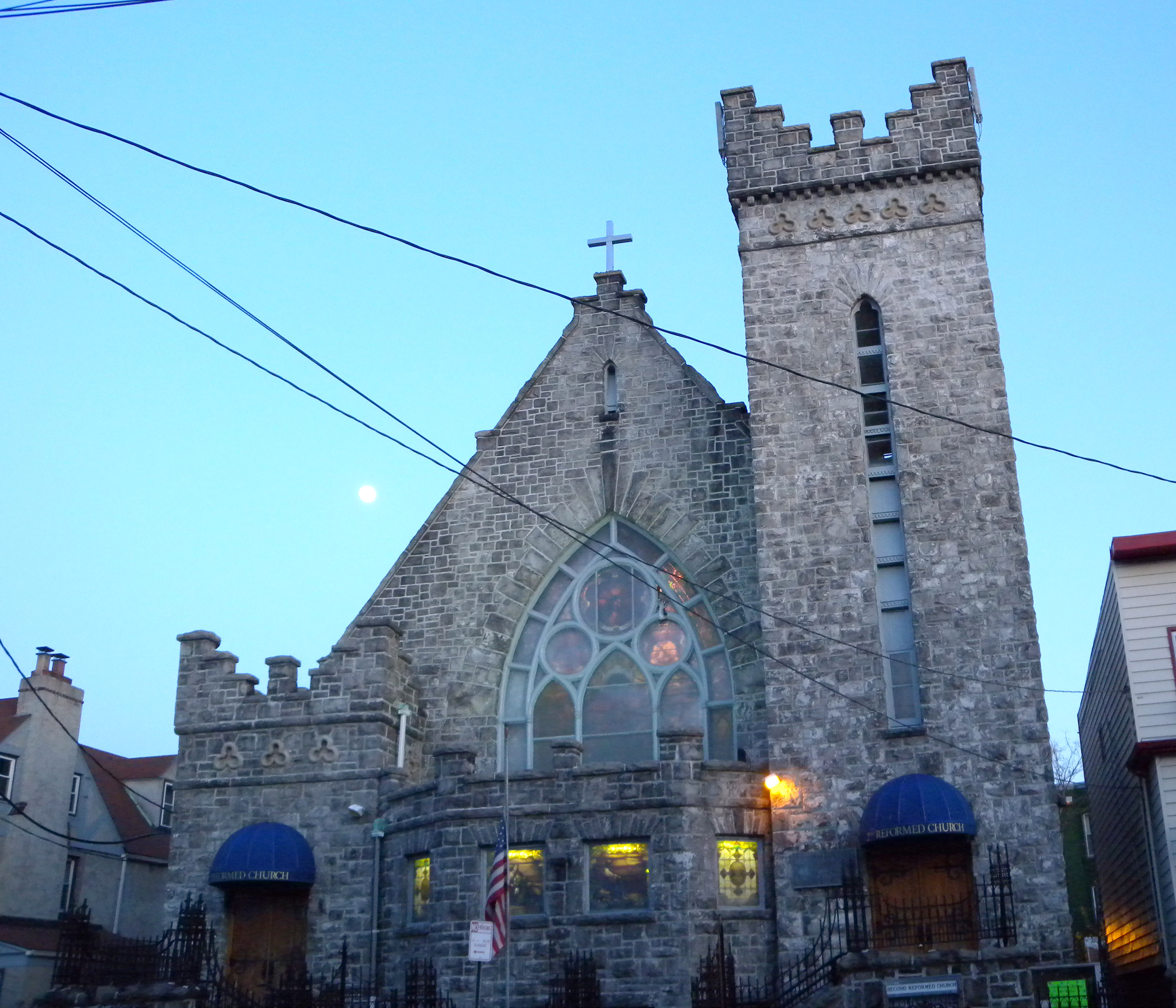
The Second Reformed Church

Summit Avenue starts at the foot of Bergen Hill, the southern emergence of the Palisades, and is the central street of the New Jersey Register of Historic Places state-designated Bergen Hill Historic District, which includes St. Johns Episcopal Church. It travels northward to the former Jersey City Medical Center, a national historic site being restored and converted to a gated neighborhood, The Beacon and crosses Montgomery Street just east of McGinley Square. Passing the Jersey City Armory, it enters the Journal Square district and at Academy Street is two blocks east of Bergen Square. The Jersey City Municipal Courts are also near the intersection. At Sip Avenue a bridge traverses the former Pennsylvania Railroad Jersey City Branch cut. It was at this location 1910 the Hudson and Manhattan Railroad opened the Summit Avenue Station, which became part of the Journal Square Transportation Center used by the Port Authority Trans Hudson rapid transit system. At the southeast side of the bridge is the New Jersey state office building, while at the northeast stands one of the oldest buildings in New Jersey, built by descendants of the first Dutch settlers. Summit Avenue is one of the streets that creates the Five Corners, the other two being early components of the Newark Plank Road. The area is the county seat of Hudson County, and home to the landmark Hudson County Courthouse. The concentration of Filipino-American creates a Little Manila, while one long block west is the India Square neighborhood. After crossing the Bergen Arches, the Long Dock Tunnel, and The Divided Highway, Summit Avenue enters central section of Jersey City Heights, and passes Jersey City Reservoir No. 3 (a nature preserve) and Pershing Field, a major park in the district. The avenue becomes more residential, with examples of Victorian and Edwardian-era homes, and pre-war low rise apartment buildings. The Second Reformed Church of Hudson City is located on the avenue.

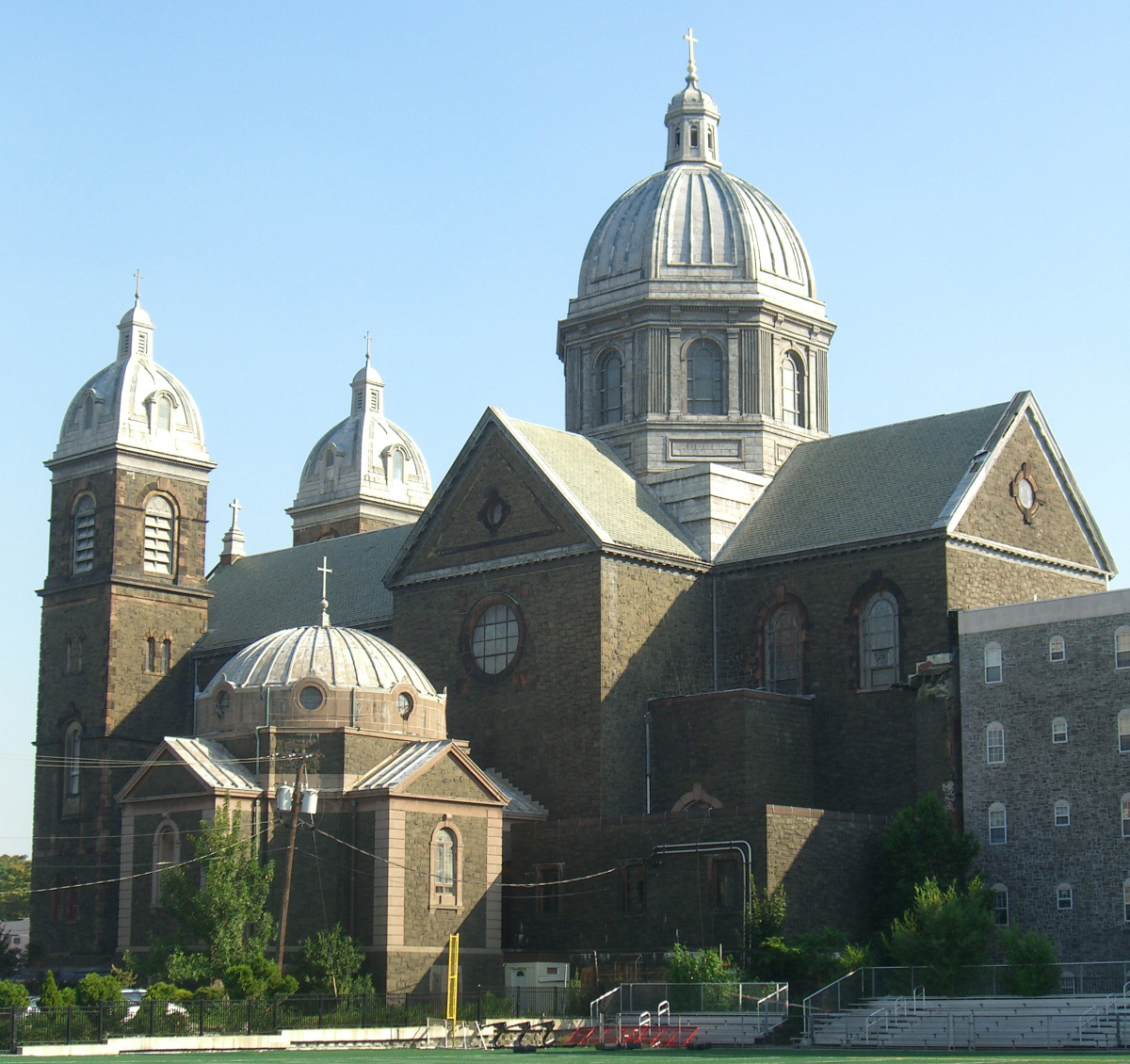
Hudson Presbyterian Church

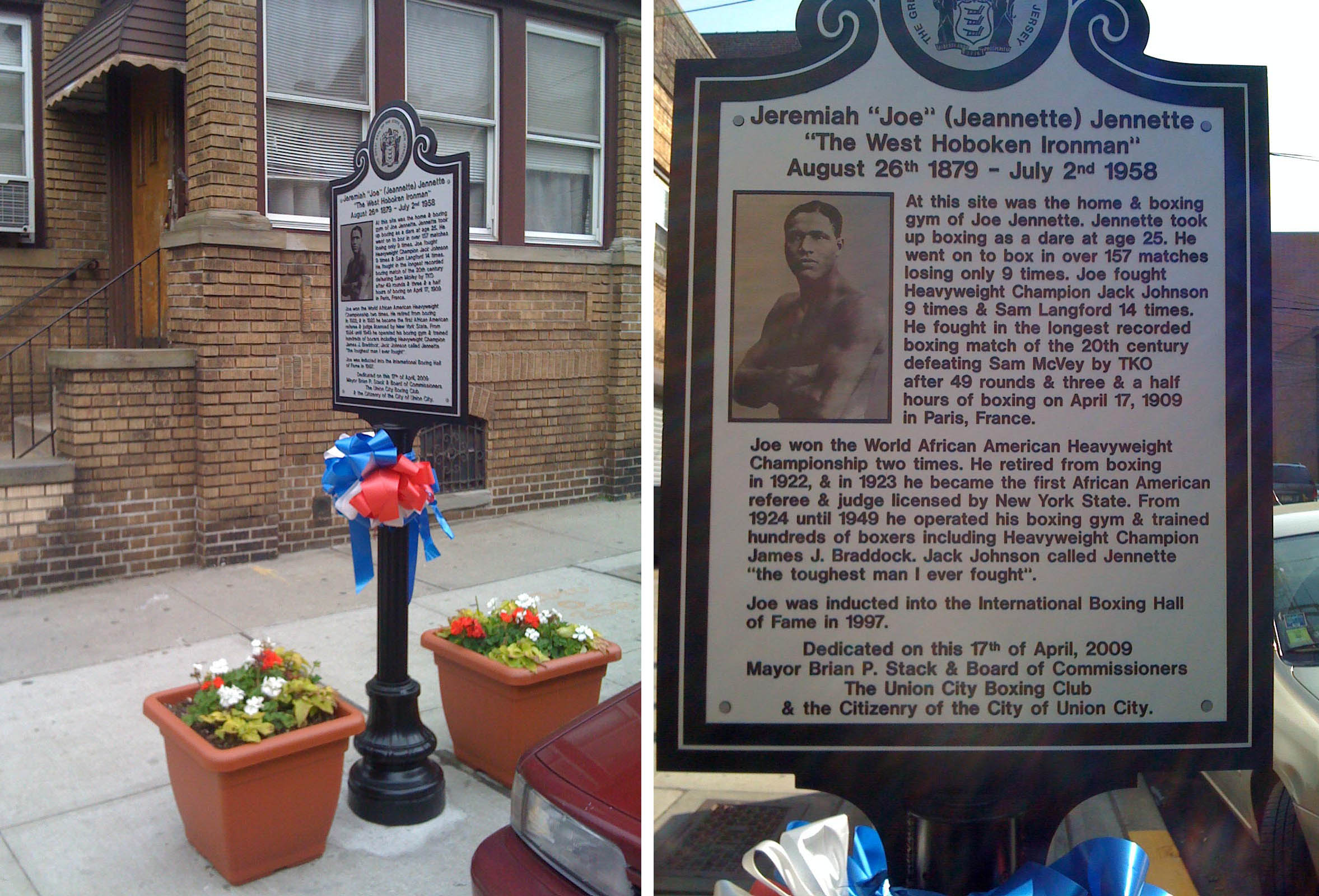
Historical marker in Union City where Joe Jeanette's home and gym once stood

Summit Avenue crosses the Union City line at Transfer Station. It is here that it intersects Paterson Plank Road, which runs to the New Jersey Meadowlands. Summit Avenue was the "downtown" of the former municipality of West Hoboken, and is still a busy commercial district. A theater from the period is now the Summit Quadplex cinema. The Summit Avenue Historic Commercial District, which runs from 9th to 32nd Streets was designated by the New Jersey Register of Historic Places in 1985.

At 18th Street the southern branch of the Union City Public Library and José Martí Middle School, named in recognition of the city's large Cuban-American community, were constructed from 2002 to 2004 on the grounds of the former Monastery and Church of Saint Michael the Archangel. (The school was later converted named José Martí STEM Academy.) Soon after Summit Avenue passes Union City High School, completed in 2009 on the site of the former Roosevelt Stadium, where Babe Ruth and Lou Gehrig played exhibition baseball games, and where National Football League greats Lou Cordileone and Frank Winters played during their high school days. At 23rd Street stands a commercial building that has two ballrooms where Frank Sinatra, Tito Nieves, La Sonora, Bacilos, Guayacan, Nelson N and others have performed. At 27th Street a memorial was placed to Joe Jeanette, a native son and notable boxer. The road crosses over New Jersey Route 495, a cut which leads into the Lincoln Tunnel. Summit Avenue ends at the 32nd Street section of the Hackensack Plank Road near the Kennedy Center (the landmark former Sears Roebuck and Company building), the Park Theater, and Schuetzen Park on Kennedy Boulevard.

The North Hudson County Railway built trolley line along the avenue. Until bustitution the Public Service Railway operated streetcar lines along the avenue which is now served by New Jersey Transit bus #85 and #83.

== See also ==
- Central Avenue (Hudson Palisades)
- Palisade Avenue (Hudson Palisades)
