= Plank Road Boom =

Economic boom in the United States

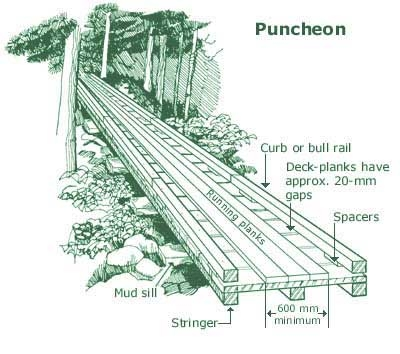
A plank road

The Plank Road Boom was an economic boom in the United States that lasted from 1844 to the mid 1850s, largely in the Eastern United States and New York. In the span of ten years, over 3,500 miles (5,600 km) of plank road were built in New York—enough road to go from Manhattan to California—and more than 10,000 miles (16,000 km) of plank road were built countrywide.

== Background ==
Plank roads were brought to the United States by Syracuse engineer George Geddes who brought them to New York from Canada. In turn, the concept is thought to have been brought to North America from Russia by the then Governor General Lord Sydenham. The first plank road in North America led out from Toronto, and was frequently cited by Geddes in his promotion of plank roads. The Toronto project was proposed by Darcy Boulton, and built under Sir Francis Bond. By 1861, the governments of Upper and Lower Canada had built between 127–162 miles of plank roads, and private companies 194–214 miles. Geddes enthusiastically reported that wooden roads lasted eight years, and cost much less than compacted crushed stone macadam roads.

Over that part of the road in Toronto, that wore out in eight years... It is found that the cost of repairs on a McAdam [macadam] road is easily greater than upon a plank road- without taking into account the great difference in the first cost. The McAdam road out from Toronto cost four hundred dollars every year to keep a mile in order... if the [plank] road is constructed, the repairs will be trifling until the road is worn out .

— George Geddes, Reference

Geddes goes on to mention that, over the eight-year span the Toronto plank road lasted, the cost of maintaining one mile of the macadam road would be sufficient to re-plank the wooden road three times. Proponents of plank roads stated that plank roads would make it much easier to carry goods and travel in general. They were stated to be 1/3 as expensive as gravel roads. Plank roads were said to give a return on investment of 20% They also claimed that the roads will last for at least eight years, and if they don't, that will be because of more people travelling on the road, which would thus result in more tolls collected. Much of the plank road building occurred in places where lumber was comparatively affordable due to thriving timber industries, as wood was usually over sixty percent of a plank road's cost.

== Boom ==
=== America ===
National newspapers helped spread the plank road craze. In 1847, Hunts Merchants Magazine published an article titled “Plank Roads-New Improvement." In 1849, Niles' Weekly Register said plank roads were "growing into universal favor." In the 1850s, the New York Tribune praised their ease of construction. In March 1850, Scientific American said they viewed plank roads as a means of “completely reforming the interior or rural transit trade of our country.” In 1852, Hunts Merchants Magazine published an article titled "The First Plank Road Movement," extolling plank roads.

In the list of great improvements which have given to this age the character which it will bear in history above all others-the age of happiness to the people-the plank road will have a prominent place, and it deserves it...the plank road is of the class of canals and railways. They are the three great inscriptions graven on the earth by the hand of modern science...

— Hunts Merchants' Magazine

They also published an editorial saying "every section of the country should be lined with these roads.” Other written items included Observations on Plank Roads (1850) by George Geddes, History, Structure and Statistics of Plank Roads in the United States and Canada (1851) by William Kingsford, and A Manual of the Principles and Practice of Road-Making (1871) by William M. Gillespie.

=== Mid-Atlantic ===
Throughout the Mid-Atlantic region, some 700 companies, and about 7,000 miles of plank road were chartered by 1857.

==== New York ====
The first plank road in the United States was the Syracuse-Central Square road, and was a massive success. Subsequently, applications to form new plank road companies poured in. By 1847, a general incorporation law was passed by the state legislature. In New York state, under the general incorporation law, from 1847 to 1854 more than 340 plank road building companies were incorporated, building about 3,500 miles of plank roads. The New York Senate reported in 1870 that plank roads were more profitable than gravel or stone roads

==== New Jersey ====
Three plank roads, the Hackensack, the Paterson, and the Newark, were major arteries in northern New Jersey. Garfield Avenue in Jersey City was also a plank road known as "Old Bergen Point Plank Road"; built in 1850. The main street in Passaic was owned and maintained by a plank road company. The roads traveled over the New Jersey Meadowlands (at the time known as the "Hackensack Meadows"), connecting the cities for which they were named to the Hudson River waterfront. Parts of the Lincoln Highway were a plank road through Newark, as were parts of Route 27. In 1912, the New York Telephone Company was granted permission to lay wire under the Paterson plank road.

There were also plank roads in the central part of the state. One such road was created to go from Freehold to Keyport. It followed roughly the path that is currently used by Route 79. Built in 1850, another one was in West Long Branch known as Larry's Creek Plank Road.

In southern New Jersey 1864 legislature approved a plank road across the salt marsh near Atlantic City. This plank road was a 16 mile, one hundred foot wide, plank road leading to Atlantic City called the "Atlantic Turnpike". The oil industry in that area in the late 1800s fueled the development of the plank road through Pleasantville NJ.

In 1901, the New Jersey legislature enacted a law to claim any plank road owned by a charter which has or will be expiring.

==== Pennsylvania ====
Pennsylvania incorporated 315 plank road companies, the second most of any state.

=== Midwest ===
After the initial craze in New York, in late 1844 and early 1845, many regional newspapers in Fort Wayne and Chicago, and throughout the Midwest called for plank roads. Newspapers such as the Chicago Democrat, and the Gem of the Prairie supported plank roads. In 1845, proponents of a Chicago-Rockford road, such as J. Young Scammon and Walter Newberry did receive a charter, but none of the proposed roads were ever built. Later on, in 1847, however; newspapers such as the Prairie Farmer carried articles praising plank roads, and one of the first plank roads in the Midwest (apart from Michigan) went from Milwaukee to Watertown.

In Indiana, and throughout much of the Midwest, social reformer Robert Dale Owen was a prominent supporter of plank roads. In 1849, the New Harmony and Mount Vernon plank road company nominated Owen (who was already the director of the company) to go to New York, and find out how roads were constructed. After returning, he wrote a number of newspaper articles and a hugely popular pamphlet titled "A Brief Practical Treatise on the Construction and Management of Plank Roads" in 1850. So huge was the demand for plank roads, by 1850, Michigan, Wisconsin, Indiana, and Illinois-set up standardized procedures for the incorporation of plank road companies. Indiana passed its plank road legislation in September 1849

==== Ohio ====
The enthusiasm for plank roads was exceptionally strong in Northern Ohio. Nine companies were chartered during 1845, eight 1848, thirty-seven in 1849, and eighty-nine in 1850. A general incorporation law was passed in 1851, allowing for any five people to form a plank road company as long as the "width of the road will be 60 feet, with 16 feet covered with stone, gravel or wood, and with no ascent over five degrees."

==== Michigan ====
While the first plank road was built in New York, the first company chartered with the intent to build a plank road was created in Michigan in 1837. That company was the Detroit, Plymouth and Ann Arbor Turnpike Company, chartered by Michigan state legislature on March 22, 1837 to build a "timber road made of good, well-hewn timber" from Detroit, in Wayne county to the village of Ann Arbor in the county of Washtenaw. Later on, in 1844, the state authorized the building of plank roads from Detroit to Port Huron and from near Sylvania, Ohio to Blissfield, Michigan. Then in 1846, Charters were given to the Corunna and Northampton and the Marshall and Union City Plank Road companies. Eventually, the interest in building plank roads became so high that in 1848, a general incorporation law was passed. The law stated that any company could operate a plank road so long as their road

That the road be two to four rods wide, sixteen feet of which was to be a good, smooth, permanent road, well drained by ditches on either side. At least eight feet of the road was to be covered with plank three inches thick. The law provided further that no grades were to be greater than one in ten and that the charters were to run for sixty years.

— Philip P. Mason, The Plank Road Craze: A Chapter in the History of Michigan's Highways

The law was subsequently amended in 1851 (shortening charters to sixty years, and making the greatest allowable grade one foot every twenty feet, as well as requiring the companies to make a report to the auditor general before the first Tuesday in January), 1855 (allowing the substitution of gravel covering nine feet wide, and ten inches thick for plank), 1859 (restoring the acceptable grade to one foot in ten) and 1867 (changing the gravel specification to nine feet wide, and seven inches thick. Tolls on the roads ranged from two cents per mile, (for two horse wagons, and every "neat score of cattle", with an additional 3/4 cents for every animal if there are more than two animals), to a maximum of one cent per mile (for one horse vehicles and every sled or sleigh) and went to as low as one-half cent per mile for every score of sheep or pigs. By 1869, plank road companies in the Bay, Clinton, Gratiot and Saginaw counties were allowed to double their tolls.

During the 1800s, 202 plank road companies were established in Michigan, and 5,802 and 1/2 miles of plank roads were chartered, with roads as long as 220 miles (from Zilwaukee to Mackinaw City, and going through Traverse City) to as short as one mile (in Sault Ste. Marie). The man who signed the law was one of the major supporters of plank roads in Michigan, governor Epaphroditus Ransom. Ransom signed the general plank road incorporation act, and throughout his governorship viewed plank roads as the solution to increasing Michigan's economy. Plank roads were very popular in rural areas, because, even when it was wet and muddy, people could still travel on plank roads. Properly maintained plank roads were known to cut four to six day trips to as short as ten to fifteen hours.

In 1854, the Farmer's Companion and Horticultural Gazette reported that " A farm adjacent to a plank road increases in value from 10-15 percent...and commands a sale from the fact that the produce never lacks a market, and has a more regular and higher net value." The most plank roads (eight) went out of Detroit to various cities, with Grand Rapids (seven) following close behind.

However, the craze did not last long. Of the 5,082 and 1/2 miles chartered, only 1,179 miles were built by 89 of the original 202 companies. When Mark Twain rode from Kalamazoo on the Grand Rapids plank road, asked how he liked his trip, he replied "It would have been good if some unconscionable scoundrel had not now and then dropped a plank across it."

=== Southeast ===
==== North Carolina ====
For a brief time, plank roads were very popular in North Carolina. The Greenville and Raleigh Plank Road and the Fayetteville and Western Plank Road were constructed. In 1852 there were thirty-nine bills for plank road charters, and in the 1854-55 legislative session, thirty-two charters were granted. The tolls allowable in North Carolina were .5 cents per mile for a horse and one rider, 2 cents per mile for a teamster with two horses, 3 cents for a teamster with three horses, and one with six horses, 4 cents. In the 1850s, about 500 miles of plank roads were built.

=== Brazil ===
Spurred on by the original success of plank roads in the United States, the Viscount of Barbacena and the Baron of Nova Friburgo, in the Rio de Janeiro province, began building a plank road. The road extended at least 14 miles, but eventually rotted.
