= The Village, Jersey City =

Populated place in Hudson County, New Jersey, US

Coordinates: 40.7338°N 74.0442°W

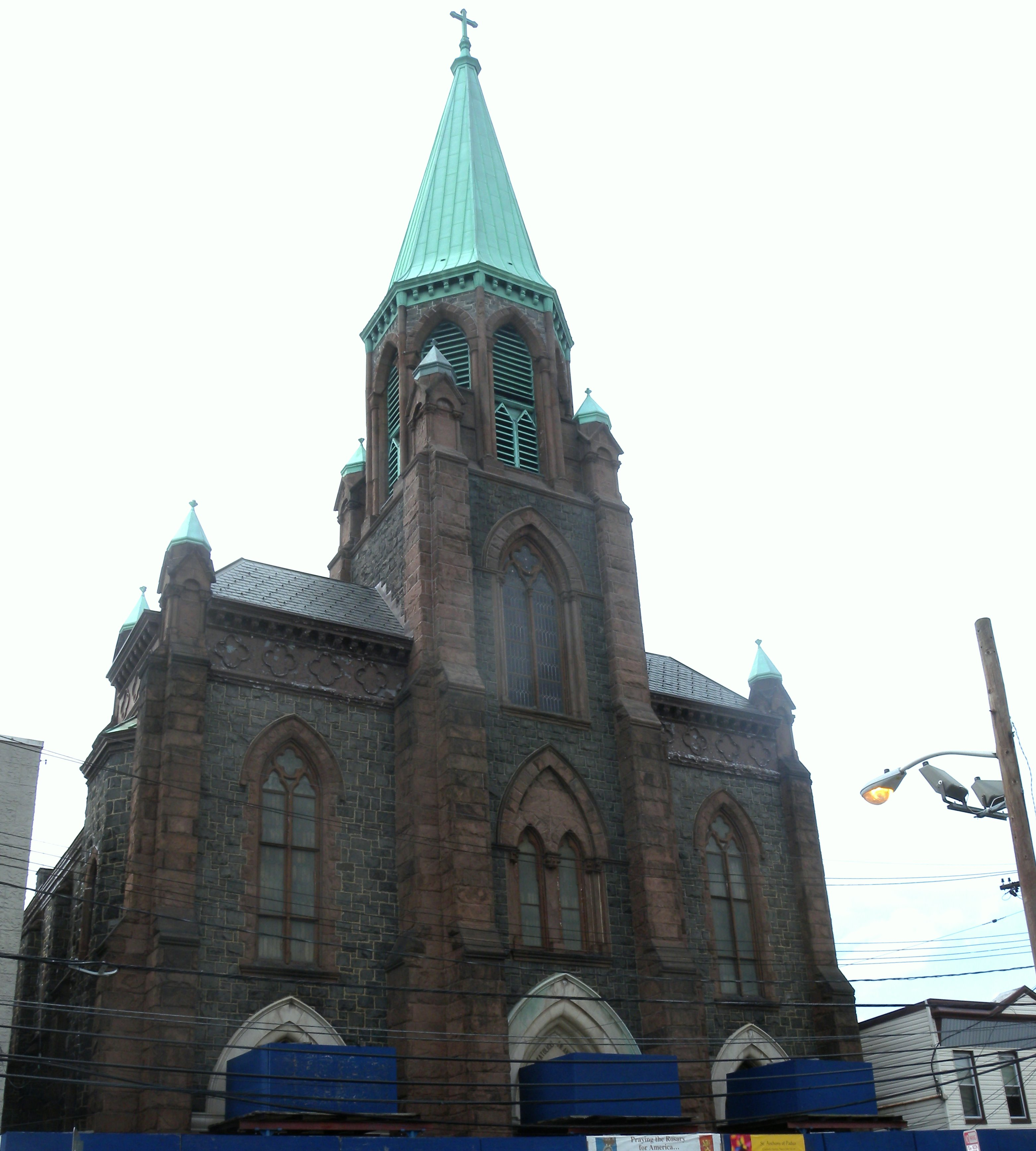
St. Anthony of Padua Roman Catholic Church at 457 Monmouth St.

The Village is a neighborhood in the western section of Historic Downtown in Jersey City. It is bordered by Hamilton Park and Harsimus Cove to the east and the Turnpike Extension to the west, on the other side of which Jones Park and Mary Benson Park are located. Newark Avenue is the major street across the Village from Grove Street at the east to Bergen Hill at the west. The neighborhood for many years was considered the city's "Little Italy" neighborhood. Brunswick Street, between 1st and 10th Streets was once full of merchants and nicknamed "Bushel Avenue". St. Anthony of Padua Roman Catholic Church at 457 Monmouth St. received its historic designation on March 22, 2004. An annual feast organised by Holy Rosary Church on 6th and Brunswick Streets has taken place since the turn of 20th century.

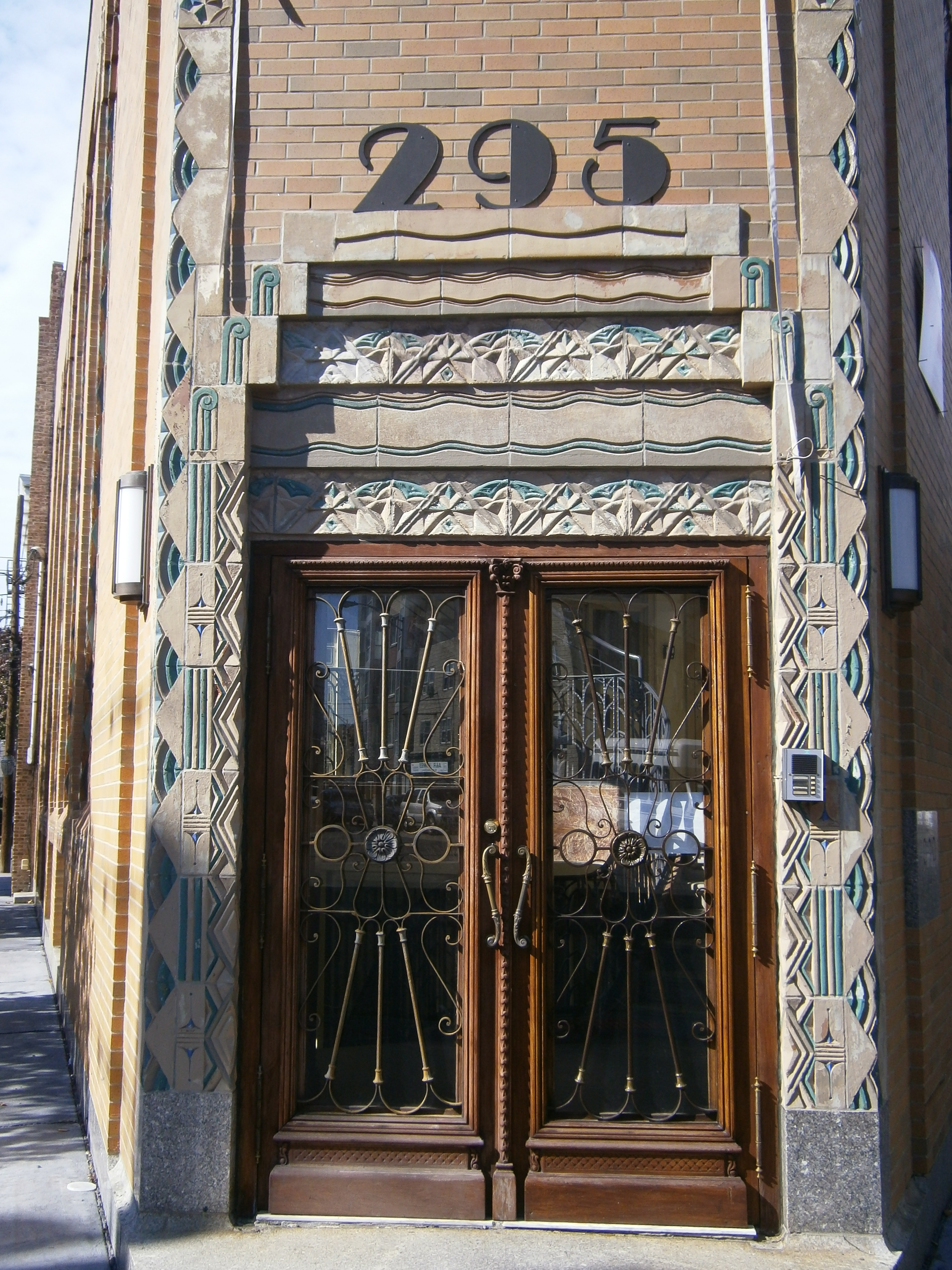
295 Newark Avenue

== See also ==
- White Eagle Hall
- Harsimus Stem Embankment
- The Horseshoe
- List of neighborhoods in Jersey City, New Jersey
- National Register of Historic Places listings in Hudson County, New Jersey
