= White Eagle Hall =

Performance venue in New Jersey, U.S.

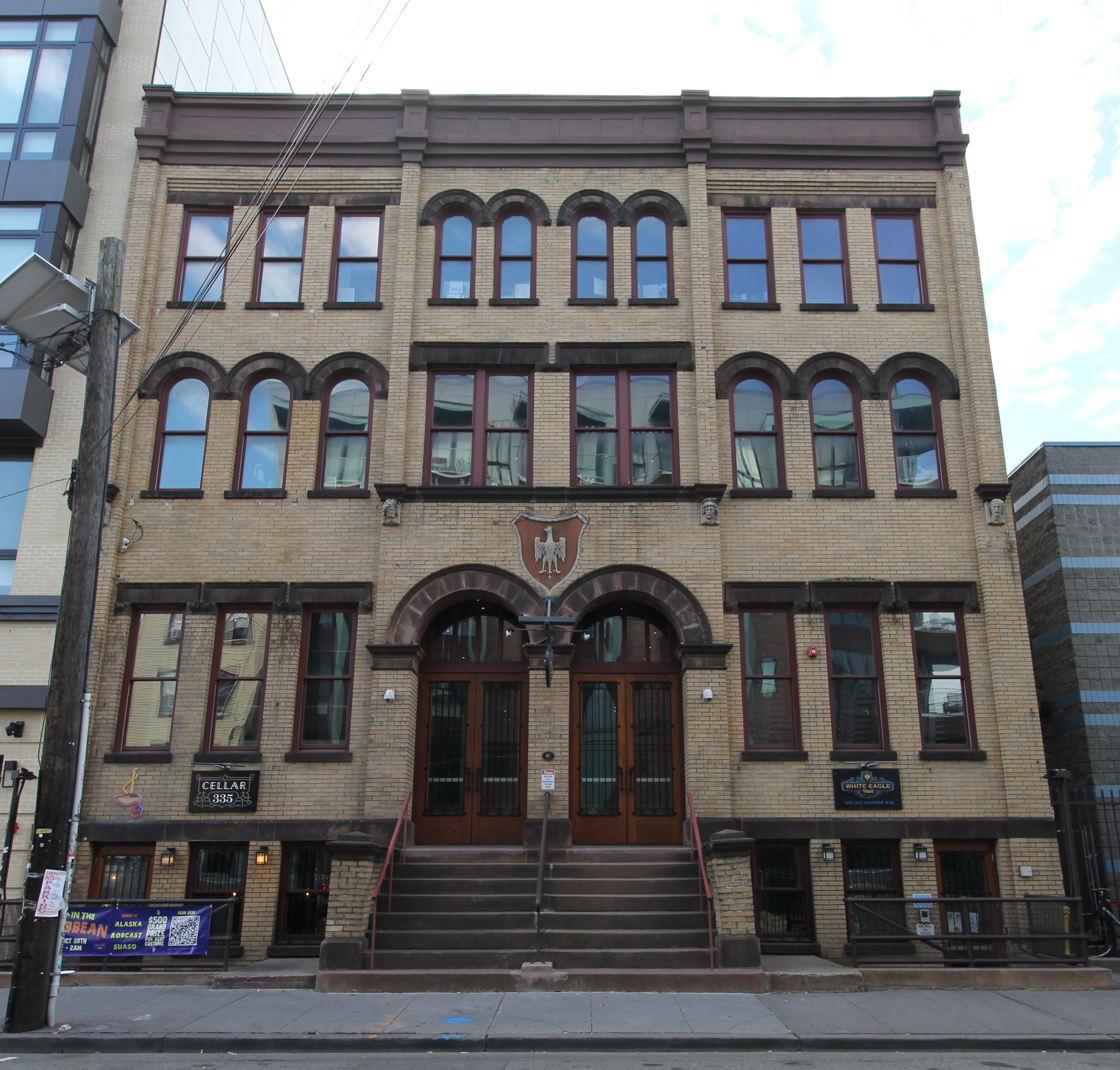

- Location within Hudson County, New Jersey

General information
- Status: Open
- Type: Performance Venue
- Location: 335-337 Newark Avenue, Jersey City, New Jersey, United States
- Coordinates: 40°43′30″N 74°03′06″W
- Opened: 1910
- Renovated: 2016
- Operator: Jersey City Theater Center, Inc (JCTC)

Height
- Height: 4 stories

Other information
- Seating capacity: 800 standing / 400 seated

Website
- www.whiteeaglehalljc.com

White Eagle Hall is a music, theatre, and dining venue in a restored historic building in the Village neighborhood of Downtown Jersey City, New Jersey, located on Newark Avenue. Originally built in 1910 as a community center, it was used for events such as bingo games, dance recitals, and concerts, and later as a basketball practice hall. It has been restored as a performing arts, gallery space, and restaurant complex. The venue is operated by Jersey City Theater Center, Inc.

== Construction and architecture ==
The white eagle is part of the coat of arms of Poland. White Eagle Hall, which opened in 1910 was built by Polish immigrants and craftsmen under the direction Rev. Peter Boleslaus Kwiatowski, who established numerous parishes in northeastern New Jersey. The facade of the building is adorned with busts of Polish heroes Ignacy Jan Paderewski, Casimir Pulaski, Tadeusz Kosciuszko, and Henryk Sienkiewicz. There are two glass skylights – one commemorating Frédéric Chopin, the classical music composer, and the other Marcella Sembrich, an internationally renowned opera star. The venue has a capacity of 800 standing or 400 seated, and can be configured for other events. It features three separate bars, 28 foot-high ceilings; a 25-foot high proscenium stage (30 feet wide and 25 feet deep) with two levels of back-stage areas, including fully equipped dressing rooms and warm up areas. The building also houses restaurants. It is seen as an important new venue in the Hudson County music scene. and has become a premiere music venue in the state.

== History ==
In 1934, ownership was transferred to St. Anthony of Padua Roman Catholic Church and served, among other purposes, as a bingo hall. For many years it was the practice gym of the national powerhouse St. Anthony High School basketball team, the Friars. They did not play any home games there (they often played at the Jersey City Armory). Coach Bob Hurley led this team to 28 state championships, 4 national championships becoming the winningest high school basketball program in United States history and was inducted into the Naismith Memorial Basketball Hall of Fame. From 1968 to 1975 "Battle of the Bands" contests took place on the stage, where talents such as Rock and Roll Hall of Famer Frank Infante, the guitarist for Blondie, got their start.

Beginning in 2013, the building underwent a comprehensive multimillion-dollar historic restoration by the Ben LoPiccolo Development Group, LLC. The original wood floor was used as bar counters and balcony flooring; wood fixtures from nearby Saint Boniface Church (from 1865) were used in the window frames, bar sides and balcony railings and ledges; Boniface altar fixtures are part the box office and merchandise area. The venue reopened in April 2017 and was operated by White Eagle Jersey City, LLC. Devils Arena Entertainment, a subsidiary of Harris Blitzer Sports & Entertainment (HBSE), took over management of the venue in September 2021.. Jersey City Theater Center, Inc (JCTC), took over full management of the venue in September 2026 and has been presenting performing arts there since its opening in 2017.

== See also ==
- Order of the White Eagle (Poland)
- New Jersey music venues by capacity
