= 14th Street Viaduct =

14th Street Viaduct may refer to:

== In Hudson County, New Jersey ==
- An extension of 14th Street (Hoboken)
- 14th Street Viaduct (Jersey City, New Jersey)

== In other locations ==
- 14th Street Viaduct (Denver, Colorado), on the National Register of Historic Places listings in downtown Denver
