= Greenville and Raleigh Plank Road =

Corporate plank road in North Carolina

The Greenville and Raleigh Plank Road was a corporate plank road from Greenville, North Carolina to the state capital in Raleigh, North Carolina. Established in 1850, it formed a "farmer's railroad" between the two cities in Eastern North Carolina as part of the Plank Road Boom. It allowed for fairly easy transportation for farm products and manufactured goods inland to the steamboat landing in Greenville.

== Construction ==
The construction of the plank roads was expensive and more difficult than thought. "State laws required the roads to be a minimum of eight feet and a maximum of sixty feet wide, and that a secondary maintained dirt road run alongside. The plank roads were to be used by heavy freight and teamsters, while lighter carriages as well as individual riders and walkers would use the side road."

A fifteen man team could lay about 650 feet of plank road per day, or about a mile in one week. By 1857, enthusiasm for the project had waned, and the plank road only reached between Greenville and Wilson, North Carolina.

The plank road when constructed from Greenville to Wilson cost about $1,453.00 per mile, and followed the path of what would later become US 264. Slave owners were paid $12.50 for the use of their slaves.

== Tolls and fines ==
Tolls of several cents a mile per horse rider or team were established. The tolls allowable in North Carolina were .5 cents per mile for a horse and one rider, 2 cents per mile for a teamster with two horses, 3 cents for a teamster with three horses, and one with six horses, 4 cents. In the 1850s, about 500 miles of plank roads were built.

There were civil fines for avoiding the tolls. If a white person was found to travel along the road without paying the tolls, a fine of $5.00 was imposed. If the person using the road without paying the tolls was a slave, the penalty was twenty lashes.

The plank road did much to improve the economy of Pitt County, North Carolina, and Wilson County, North Carolina. Stores were built along the route, and the small villages or toll gates of Walshville, North Carolina and Marlboro, North Carolina, were built to service the traffic. Marlboro soon had two academies, one for boys and one for girls. The steamer "Morehead", was built to run in connection with coaches and wagons on the toll road.

Attempts to increase the scope of the plank road by purchasing stagecoaches and horse teams, and then contract for carrying the US Mail along the route were the subject of a court case that went up to the North Carolina Supreme Court and was finally settled in 1857 by 56 N.C. 183. Objections to the purchase of the stagecoaches included spending the money on the repair of the plank road, or dividing the $4,000.00 profits accumulated until then among the stockholders.

The plank road was established to Wilson, North Carolina by 1857, but by 1861 the corporation would go bankrupt. It never was constructed from Wilson to Raleigh as planned. Competition from the railroads, expenses in laying and maintaining the plank road, and the outbreak of the American Civil War all contributed to the demise of this enterprise.

The route of the plank road became part of the route of US 264 between Greenville and Wilson, North Carolina. Although no longer maintained, the route was used by traffic. James Leonidas Fleming, who established East Carolina University in Greenville, was killed in an automobile accident along the plank road in 1909.

== Legacy ==
There is a state historical marker #F-17 placed on Pender Street and East Nash Street in Wilson, North Carolina. The text says, "The western terminus of the Greenville and Raleigh Plank Road, chartered in 1850 and completed to Wilson by 1853, was nearby."

There is a state historical marker #F-18 placed on Tenth and Dickinson Streets in Greenville, North Carolina, that says: "The eastern terminus of the Greenville and Raleigh Plank Road, chartered in 1850 and completed to Wilson by 1853, was nearby."

There is another stone marker in Farmville, North Carolina, that marks the spot of a toll booth nearby. "This stone marker just east of Farmville along US 264A marks the location of a former toll booth for the Greenville & Raleigh Plank Road Company. This private company was chartered by the legislature in 1850 and began construction in Greenville the following year. By 1853, the road made it to Wilson but it would go no further. The company would fold in 1861."

== Bibliography ==
- Alan D. Watson, Internal Improvements in North Carolina (2002)
- Greenville and Raleigh Plank Road Company. Charter and by-Laws of the Greenville and Raleigh Plank Road Company: Incorporated by the General Assembly of North Carolina, 1850-1, Together with the Names of the Stockholders Alphabetically Arranged, the Amount of Stock Subscribed by Each, and the Proceedings of the Stockholders at Their First Meeting, &C. Washington, N.C.: Printed at the Office of the North State Whig, 1851.
- McCluer, James H. James H. McCluer Papers. 1764-1895. Abstract: Collection consists of correspondence, land records, and legal papers of the McCluer family of Pitt County, N.C. The bulk of the collection consists of family correspondence. Topics include the conditions of the poor in New York City, California gold rush "mania," and the price of produce in Mississippi. Also included in this collection are land records for Greenville and Washington, N.C.; marriage contracts between James H. McCluer and Louisa Ellis, and John Doughty and Mary Thomas Matthews; stock shares of the Greenville and Raleigh Plank Road; a deed for slaves; and family Bible records. Other items include a cartoon for the 1892 presidential election and an opera house advertisement.
- Robert B. Starling, “The Plank Road Movement in North Carolina,” North Carolina Historical Review (1939): 1-22 and 147-73
- WISWALL V. GREENVILLE AND RALEIGH PLANK ROAD CO. Supreme Court of North Carolina. June 1857.
- North Carolina State Supreme Court. Wiswall vs. Greenville and Raleigh Plank Road. June Term, 1857. Pages 183-186.
