= List of county routes in Hudson County, New Jersey =

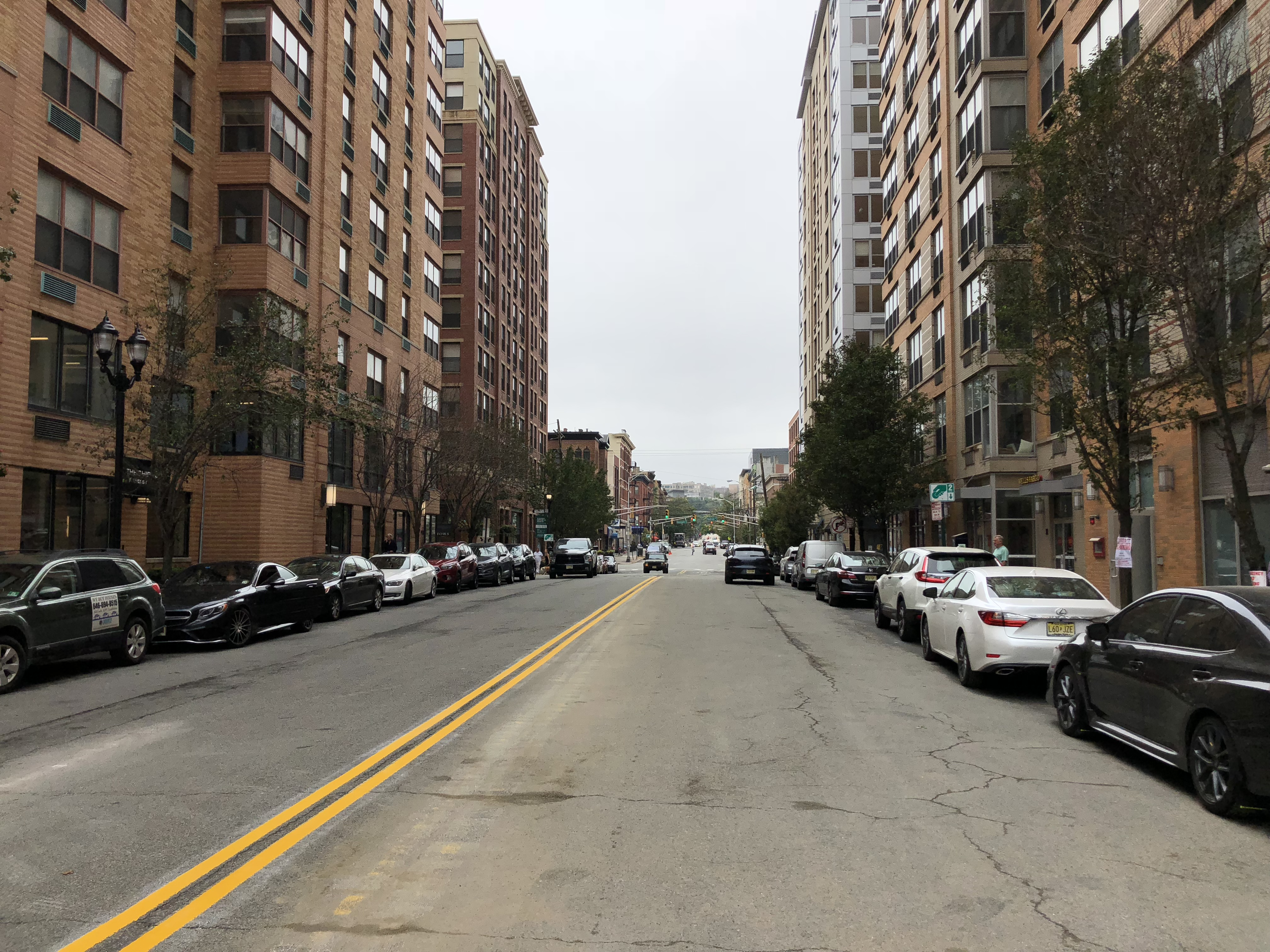
CR 670 (14th Street) in Hoboken

The following is a list of county routes in Hudson County in the U.S. state of New Jersey. For more information on the county route system in New Jersey as a whole, including its history, see County routes in New Jersey.

== 500-series county routes ==
In addition to those listed below, the following 500-series county routes serve Hudson County:

- CR 501, CR 505, CR 507, CR 508

== Other county routes ==
Route	Length (mi)	Length (km)	From	Via	To	Notes
CR 601	0.94	1.51	Merritt Street (CR 707) in Jersey City	Old Bergen Road	Kennedy Boulevard (CR 501) in Jersey City	Unsigned, municipally maintained
CR 602	1.12	1.80	Princeton Avenue in Jersey City	Danforth Avenue	Route 440 in Jersey City	Unsigned, municipally maintained
CR 603	0.77	1.24	Ocean Avenue in Jersey City	Seaview Avenue, Romar Avenue	Greenville Avenue (CR 710) in Jersey City	Unsigned, municipally maintained
CR 604	1.01	1.63	West Side Avenue (CR 605) in Jersey City	Woodlawn Avenue	Garfield Avenue in Jersey City	Unsigned, municipally maintained
CR 605	2.45	3.94	Danforth Avenue (CR 602) in Jersey City	West Side Avenue, Duncan Avenue	Truck US 1/9 in Jersey City	Unsigned, municipally maintained
CR 606	0.38	0.61	Kennedy Boulevard (CR 501) in Jersey City	Fulton Avenue	West Side Avenue (CR 605) in Jersey City	Unsigned, municipally maintained
CR 607	1.97	3.17	Kennedy Boulevard (CR 501) in Jersey City	Bergen Avenue	Kennedy Boulevard (CR 501) in Jersey City	Unsigned, municipally maintained
CR 608	0.28	0.45	West Side Avenue (CR 605) in Jersey City	Claremont Avenue	Kennedy Boulevard (CR 501) in Jersey City	Unsigned, municipally maintained
CR 609	1.52	2.45	McAdoo Avenue in Jersey City	Martin Luther King Drive	Communipaw Avenue (CR 612) in Jersey City	Unsigned, municipally maintained
CR 610	0.26	0.42	Garfield Avenue in Jersey City	Union Street	Ocean Avenue in Jersey City	Unsigned, municipally maintained
CR 611	0.71	1.14	Fisk Street in Jersey City	Mallory Avenue	Communipaw Avenue (CR 612) in Jersey City	Municipally maintained
CR 612	1.94	3.12	Route 440 in Jersey City	Communipaw Avenue	I-78 in Jersey City	Municipally maintained
CR 613	0.92	1.48	Bayview Avenue in Jersey City	Arlington Avenue	Grand Street (CR 622) in Jersey City	Municipally maintained
CR 614	0.81	1.30	Corneilson Avenue (CR 619) in Jersey City	Johnston Avenue	I-78 in Jersey City	Municipally maintained
CR 615	0.44	0.71	Communipaw Avenue (CR 612) in Jersey City	Monticello Avenue	Fairmount Avenue in Jersey City	Municipally maintained
CR 616 (1)	0.23	0.37	Summit Avenue (CR 617) in Jersey City	Wayne Street	Corneilson Avenue (CR 619) in Jersey City	Municipally maintained
CR 616 (2)	0.24	0.39	Factory Drive in Jersey City	Wayne Street	Merseles Street (CR 728) in Jersey City	Municipally maintained
CR 616 (3)	0.26	0.42	Brunswick Street (CR 629) in Jersey City	Wayne Street	Jersey Avenue (CR 631) in Jersey City	Municipally maintained
CR 617	4.55	7.32	Grand Street (CR 622) in Jersey City	Summit Avenue	32nd Street (CR 691) and Bergen Turnpike (CR 691) in Union City	Gaps in route between Route 139 and Manhattan Avenue as well as Secaucus Road (CR 678) and 22nd Street. Municipally maintained
CR 618	1.17	1.88	Merseles Street (CR 728) in Jersey City	York Street	York Street (CR 624) in Jersey City	Municipally maintained
CR 619	0.64	1.03	Summit Avenue (CR 617) in Jersey City	Cornelison Avenue, Bright Street	Fremont Street in Jersey City	Municipally maintained
CR 620	0.57	0.92	Center Street in Jersey City	Bright Street	Grand Street (CR 622) in Jersey City	Municipally maintained
CR 621	0.74	1.19	Bramhall Avenue in Jersey City	Pacific Avenue	Grand Street (CR 622) in Jersey City	Municipally maintained
CR 622	1.12	1.80	Bramhall Avenue in Jersey City	Grand Street	Johnston Avenue (CR 614) in Jersey City	Municipally maintained
CR 623	0.35	0.56	Bergen Avenue (CR 607) in Jersey City	Storms Avenue	Summit Avenue (CR 617) in Jersey City	Municipally maintained
CR 624	0.77	1.24	Grove Street (CR 635) in Jersey City	Montgomery Street, York Street	Essex Street in Jersey City	Municipally maintained
CR 625	0.60	0.97	Montgomery Street (CR 624) in Jersey City	Bergen Avenue, Sip Avenue	Summit Avenue (CR 617) in Jersey City	Municipally maintained
CR 626	0.58	0.93	Merseles Street (CR 728) in Jersey City	3rd Street	Grove Street (CR 635) in Jersey City	Municipally maintained
CR 627	0.92	1.48	Marin Boulevard (CR 637) in Jersey City	1st Street, Washington Street	Dudley Street (CR 724) in Jersey City	Municipally maintained
CR 628	0.54	0.87	Grove Street (CR 635) in Jersey City	4th Street	Merseles Street (CR 728) in Jersey City	Municipally maintained
CR 629	0.71	1.14	York Street (CR 618) in Jersey City	Brunswick Street	10th Street in Jersey City	Municipally maintained
CR 630	0.44	0.71	Division Street in Jersey City	8th Street	Erie Street (CR 633) in Jersey City	Municipally maintained
CR 631	0.74	1.19	Grand Street (CR 622) in Jersey City	Jersey Avenue	8th Street (CR 630) in Jersey City	Municipally maintained
CR 632 (1)	0.21	0.34	Brunswick Street (CR 629) in Jersey City	Pavonia Avenue	Hamilton Place (CR 729) in Jersey City	Municipally maintained
CR 632 (2)	0.09	0.14	Erie Street (CR 633) in Jersey City	Pavonia Avenue	Grove Street (CR 635) in Jersey City	Municipally maintained
CR 633	0.86	1.38	Newark Avenue (CR 639) in Jersey City	Erie Street	16th Street in Jersey City	Municipally maintained
CR 634	0.53	0.85	Brunswick Street (CR 629) in Jersey City	9th Street	Marin Boulevard (CR 637) in Jersey City	Municipally maintained
CR 635	1.44	2.32	Grand Street (CR 622) in Jersey City	Grove Street	Newark Street (CR 636) in Hoboken	Municipally maintained
CR 636	0.84	1.35	Jersey Avenue (CR 631) in Jersey City	Newark Street	Frank Sinatra Drive in Hoboken	
CR 637	1.42	2.29	York Street (CR 618) in Jersey City	Marin Boulevard	Newark Street (CR 636) in Jersey City	Gap in route between 2nd Street and 9th Street (CR 634). Municipally maintained
CR 638	0.71	1.14	Paterson Avenue (CR 681) in Hoboken	1st Street	Hudson Street (CR 679) in Hoboken	
CR 639	1.44	2.32	Grove Street (CR 635) in Jersey City	Newark Avenue	Newark Avenue continuation (CR 644) and Summit Avenue (CR 617) in Jersey City	Newark Avenue makes a sharp angle at the intersection of Summit Avenue (CR 617). On the east side of Newark Avenue, it is CR 639. On the other side, after one block (Kennedy Boulevard), it becomes CR 644. This road is municipally maintained.
CR 640	0.22	0.35	West Side Avenue (CR 641) in Jersey City	Pavonia Avenue	Tonnelle Avenue in Hoboken	Municipally maintained
CR 641	0.63	1.01	Montgomery Street (CR 624) in Jersey City	West Side Avenue	Dead end in Jersey City	Municipally maintained
CR 642	0.44	0.71	Tonnelle Avenue in Jersey City	Broadway	Truck US 1/9 in Jersey City	Municipally maintained
CR 643	0.69	1.11	Howell Street in Jersey City	Duffield Avenue, Van Keuren Avenue	West Side Avenue in Jersey City	Municipally maintained
CR 644	1.19	1.92	James Avenue in Jersey City	Newark Avenue, Hoboken Avenue, Oakland Avenue	Prospect Street (CR 654) in Jersey City	Gap in route on Newark Avenue between Kennedy Boulevard (CR 501) to the west and Summit Avenue (CR 617) and Newark Avenue continuation (CR 639) to the east. To the east of the gap, continues on Hoboken Avenue (Newark Avenue is on CR 639 in this sector), and then turns north on Oakland Avenue. This road is municipally maintained.
CR 645	0.12	0.19	Truck US 1/9 and Route 7 in Jersey City	Charlotte Avenue	St. Pauls Avenue (CR 646) in Jersey City	Municipally maintained
CR 646	0.91	1.46	Duffield Avenue (CR 643) in Jersey City	St. Pauls Avenue	Route 139 in Jersey City	Municipally maintained
CR 647	0.79	1.27	Throne Street in Jersey City	Liberty Avenue	Dead end in Jersey City	Municipally maintained
CR 648	0.17	0.27	Summit Avenue (CR 617) in Jersey City	Laidlaw Avenue	Central Avenue (CR 663) in Jersey City	Municipally maintained
CR 649	1.02	1.64	Manhattan Avenue in Jersey City	Terrace Avenue	Tonnelle Avenue (US 1/9) in Jersey City	Municipally maintained
CR 650	0.25	0.40	Summit Avenue (CR 617) in Jersey City	Troy Street, Lake Street	Kennedy Boulevard (CR 501) in Jersey City	Municipally maintained
CR 652	0.57	0.92	County Road (CR 653) in Jersey City	Zabriskie Street	Central Avenue (CR 663) in Jersey City	Municipally maintained
CR 653	3.01	4.84	Tonnelle Avenue (US 1/9) in Jersey City	County Road, County Avenue	Paterson Plank Road (CR 681) in Secaucus	
CR 654	0.31	0.50	Palisade Avenue in Jersey City	Prospect Street	Central Avenue (CR 663) in Jersey City	Municipally maintained
CR 655	0.67	1.08	Dead end in Secaucus	New County Road	County Road (CR 653) in Secaucus	
CR 656	0.31	0.50	Central Avenue (CR 663) in Jersey City	Reservoir Avenue	Palisade Avenue in Jersey City	Municipally maintained
CR 657	0.77	1.24	New County Road (CR 655) in Secaucus	County Road Extension	Dead end in Secaucus	
CR 658	0.21	0.34	Webster Avenue (CR 669) in Jersey City	Booraem Avenue	Central Avenue (CR 663) in Jersey City	
CR 659	1.82	2.93	Truck US 1/9 in Kearny	Central Avenue, Pennsylvania Avenue, Fish House Road	Route 7 in Kearny	
CR 660	0.31	0.50	Webster Avenue (CR 669) in Jersey City	Ferry Street	Palisade Avenue in Jersey City	Municipally maintained
CR 661	0.38	0.61	Troy Street (CR 650) in Jersey City	Montrose Avenue, Sanford Place	Zabriskie Street (CR 652) in Jersey City	Municipally maintained
CR 662	0.10	0.16	Webster Avenue (CR 669) in Jersey City	Ravine Avenue	Palisade Avenue in Jersey City	Municipally maintained
CR 663	1.60	2.57	Hoboken Avenue (CR 644) in Jersey City	Central Avenue	Paterson Plank Road (CR 681) on the Jersey City/Union City border	Municipally maintained
CR 664	0.63	1.01	Kennedy Boulevard (CR 501) in Jersey City	Congress Street	Palisade Avenue in Jersey City	Municipally maintained
CR 665	0.72	1.16	Franklin Street in Jersey City	Cambridge Avenue	North Street in Jersey City	Municipally maintained
CR 666	0.37	0.60	Nelson Avenue (CR 689) in Jersey City	Poplar Street	Central Avenue (CR 663) in Jersey City	Municipally maintained
CR 667	0.72	1.16	Franklin Street in Jersey City	Hancock Avenue	North Street in Jersey City	Municipally maintained
CR 668	0.54	0.87	Terrace Avenue (CR 649) in Jersey City	Leonard Street	Central Avenue (CR 663) in Jersey City	Municipally maintained
CR 669	1.00	1.61	Prospect Street (CR 654) in Jersey City	Webster Avenue	Paterson Plank Road (CR 681) on the Jersey City/Union City border	Municipally maintained
CR 670	0.66	1.06	Wing Viaduct (CR 683) in Hoboken	14th Street, Frank Sinatra Drive	12th Street and Hudson Street (CR 679) in Hoboken	
CR 671	1.26	2.03	Observer Highway at the Hoboken border in Jersey City	New York Avenue	Paterson Avenue (CR 681) and Observer Highway (CR 681) in Jersey City	Municipally maintained
CR 672	0.44	0.71	Palisade Avenue on the Union City/Weehawken border	27th Street	Kennedy Boulevard (CR 501) on the North Bergen/Union City border	Municipally maintained
CR 673	1.24	2.00	14th Street (CR 670) in Hoboken	Garden Street	Observer Highway (CR 681) in Hoboken	
CR 674	0.19	0.31	Bergenline Avenue in Union City	35th Street	Kennedy Boulevard (CR 501) in Union City	Municipally maintained
CR 675	1.52	2.45	Observer Highway (CR 681) in Hoboken	Willow Avenue	19th Street in Weehawken	
CR 676	0.34	0.55	Paterson Plank Road (CR 681) in North Bergen	Union Turnpike	Bergen Turnpike (CR 691) in Union City	
CR 677 (1)	0.40	0.64	Observer Highway (CR 681) in Hoboken	Park Avenue	4th Street in Hoboken	
CR 677 (2)	2.14	3.44	5th Street in Hoboken	Park Avenue	19th Street in Weehawken	
CR 678	1.74	2.80	County Avenue (CR 653) in Secaucus	Secaucus Road, 5th Street	Paterson Plank Road (CR 681) at the Transfer Station on the Jersey City/Union City border	
CR 679	1.25	2.01	14th Street (CR 670) in Hoboken	Hudson Street	Observer Highway (CR 681) in Hoboken	
CR 680	0.47	0.76	Park Avenue in Union City	47th Street	Kennedy Boulevard (CR 501) in Union City	Municipally maintained
CR 681	6.00	9.66	Hudson Street (CR 679) in Hoboken	Observer Highway, Paterson Avenue, Paterson Plank Road	Dead end in Secaucus	
CR 682	0.42	0.68	Ferry Road in Weehawken	Pershing Road	JFK Boulevard East (CR 505) in Weehawken	Municipally maintained
CR 683	0.82	1.32	Paterson Plank Road (CR 681) in Union City	Wing Viaduct	Manhattan Avenue and 16th Street in Union City	
CR 684	0.36	0.58	Bergenline Avenue in Union City	48th Street	Park Avenue in Union City	Municipally maintained
CR 685	0.96	1.54	Paterson Plank Road (CR 681) in Union City	Palisade Avenue	20th Street in Union City	Municipally maintained
CR 686	0.26	0.42	Van Vorst Street (CR 725) in Jersey City	Sussex Street	Greene Street in Jersey City	Municipally maintained
CR 687	0.18	0.29	Wing Viaduct (CR 683) and 16th Street in Union City	Manhattan Avenue	19th Street in Union City	
CR 688	0.60	0.97	Essex Street in Jersey City	Warren Street	2nd Street in Jersey City	Municipally maintained
CR 689	0.48	0.77	Kennedy Boulevard (CR 501) in Jersey City	Nelson Avenue	Secaucus Road (CR 678) on the Jersey City/North Bergen border	Municipally maintained
CR 690	0.52	0.84	West 1st Street in Bayonne	Kennedy Boulevard	Kennedy Boulevard (CR 501) and Route 440 in Bayonne	
CR 691	1.39	2.24	Tonnelle Avenue (US 1/9) in North Bergen	Bergen Turnpike, 32nd Street, Hackensack Plank Road	Gregory Avenue in Weehawken	
CR 693	2.54	4.09	JFK Boulevard East (CR 505) and Anthony M. Defino Way (CR 505) in West New York	JFK Boulevard East	Bergen Boulevard (Route 63/CR 501) in North Bergen	
CR 695	0.75	1.21	Hudson Avenue in Secaucus	Hudson Street	Paterson Plank Road (CR 681) in Secaucus	Municipally maintained
CR 697	3.59	5.78	Jackson Street at the Essex County line in Harrison	Frank E. Rodgers Boulevard, Kearny Avenue	Belleville Turnpike (Route 7) on the Kearny/North Arlington border	
CR 699	3.03	4.88	Harrison Avenue (CR 508) in Harrison	Passaic Avenue	River Road (CR 507) and Belleville Turnpike (Route 7) on the Kearny/North Arlington border	
CR 700	0.12	0.19	Avenue A in Bayonne	Gertrude Street	Kennedy Boulevard (CR 690) in Bayonne	Municipally maintained
CR 701	0.12	0.19	Avenue A in Bayonne	West 3rd Street	Kennedy Boulevard (CR 690) in Bayonne	Municipally maintained
CR 702	0.12	0.19	Avenue A in Bayonne	Juliette Street	Kennedy Boulevard (CR 690) in Bayonne	Municipally maintained
CR 703	0.18	0.29	Kennedy Boulevard (CR 501) in Bayonne	North Street	Avenue C in Bayonne	Municipally maintained
CR 704	0.33	0.53	Lord Avenue in Bayonne	East 2nd Street	Ingham Avenue in Bayonne	Municipally maintained
CR 705	0.20	0.32	East 1st Street in Bayonne	Lexington Avenue	East 3rd Street in Bayonne	Municipally maintained
CR 706	0.15	0.24	Broadway in Bayonne	East 53rd Street	Avenue E in Bayonne	Municipally maintained
CR 707	0.14	0.23	Avenue C in Jersey City	Merritt Street	Garfield Avenue in Jersey City	Municipally maintained
CR 708	0.12	0.19	Kennedy Boulevard (CR 501) in Jersey City	Custer Avenue	Dead end in Jersey City	Municipally maintained
CR 709	0.29	0.47	Bartholdi Avenue in Jersey City	Sullivan Drive	Danforth Avenue (CR 602) in Jersey City	Municipally maintained
CR 710	0.14	0.23	Kennedy Boulevard (CR 501) in Jersey City	Greenville Avenue	Fowler Avenue in Jersey City	Municipally maintained
CR 711	0.13	0.21	Fowler Avenue in Jersey City	Linden Avenue	Kennedy Boulevard (CR 501) in Jersey City	Municipally maintained
CR 712	0.09	0.14	Old Bergen Road (CR 601) in Jersey City	Rose Avenue	Long Street in Jersey City	Municipally maintained
CR 714	0.15	0.24	Kennedy Boulevard (CR 501) in Jersey City	Van Houten Avenue	Dead end in Jersey City	Municipally maintained
CR 715	0.19	0.31	Communipaw Avenue (CR 612) in Jersey City	Park Street, Astor Place	Summit Avenue (CR 617) in Jersey City	Municipally maintained
CR 716	0.09	0.14	Summit Avenue (CR 617) in Jersey City	Howard Place	Storms Avenue (CR 623) in Jersey City	Municipally maintained
CR 717	0.08	0.13	Kennedy Boulevard (CR 501) in Jersey City	Academy Street	Liberty Avenue (CR 647) in Jersey City	Municipally maintained
CR 718	0.10	0.16	Kennedy Boulevard (CR 501) in Jersey City	Carlton Avenue	Liberty Avenue (CR 647) in Jersey City	Municipally maintained
CR 719	0.23	0.37	JFK Boulevard East (CR 693) in North Bergen	Palisade Avenue	Palisade Avenue (CR 27) at the Bergen County line in North Bergen	
CR 720 (1)	0.11	0.18	Central Avenue in Union City	28th Street	Bergenline Avenue in Union City	Municipally maintained
CR 720 (2)	0.08	0.13	New York Avenue in Union City	28th Street	Palisade Avenue on the Union City/Weehawken border	Municipally maintained
CR 721	0.04	0.06	JFK Boulevard East (CR 693) in North Bergen	Nungessers	Fairview Avenue (CR 48) and Woodcliff Avenue at the Bergen County line in North Bergen	Municipally maintained
CR 722	0.30	0.48	Monitor Street in Jersey City	Maple Street	Dead end in Jersey City	Municipally maintained
CR 723	0.18	0.29	Kennedy Boulevard (CR 501) in North Bergen	Bergenwood Avenue	Bergenwood Road (CR S48) at the Bergen County line in North Bergen	Municipally maintained
CR 724	0.08	0.13	Warren Street in Jersey City	Dudley Street	Washington Street (CR 627) in Jersey City	Municipally maintained
CR 725	0.15	0.24	Morris Street in Jersey City	Van Vorst Street	York Street (CR 618) in Jersey City	Municipally maintained
CR 726	0.24	0.39	Marin Boulevard (CR 637) in Jersey City	Morgan Street	Washington Street (CR 627) in Jersey City	Municipally maintained
CR 727	0.26	0.42	3rd Street (CR 626) in Jersey City	Colgate Street, 1st Street	Monmouth Street in Jersey City	Municipally maintained
CR 728 (1)	0.09	0.14	Montgomery Street (CR 624) in Jersey City	Merseles Street	Bright Street in Jersey City	Municipally maintained
CR 728 (2)	0.16	0.26	2nd Street in Jersey City	Merseles Street	Newark Avenue (CR 639) in Jersey City	Municipally maintained
CR 729	0.10	0.16	8th Street (CR 630) in Jersey City	Hamilton Place	9th Street (CR 634) in Jersey City	Municipally maintained
CR 730	0.10	0.16	9th Street (CR 634) in Jersey City	McWilliams Place	8th Street (CR 630) in Jersey City	Municipally maintained
CR 731	0.24	0.39	Ogden Avenue in Jersey City	Mountain Road	Paterson Plank Road (CR 681) and Paterson Avenue (CR 681) in Jersey City	Municipally maintained
CR 732	0.04	0.06	Park Avenue (CR 677) in Hoboken	15th Street	Willow Avenue (CR 675) in Hoboken	Municipally maintained
CR 733	0.04	0.06	Willow Avenue (CR 675) in Hoboken	16th Street	Park Avenue (CR 677) in Hoboken	Municipally maintained
CR 734	0.07	0.11	West 1st Street (CR 735) in Bayonne	Trask Avenue	West 2nd Street in Bayonne	Municipally maintained
CR 735	0.21	0.34	Kennedy Boulevard (CR 690) in Bayonne	West 1st Street	Humphrey Avenue in Bayonne	Municipally maintained
CR 736	0.05	0.08	Hudson Street (CR 679) in Hoboken	Hudson Place	River Street in Hoboken	Municipally maintained
