= Bergen Point Plank Road =

Highway in New Jersey, United States

Coordinates: 40°43′02″N 74°03′42″W

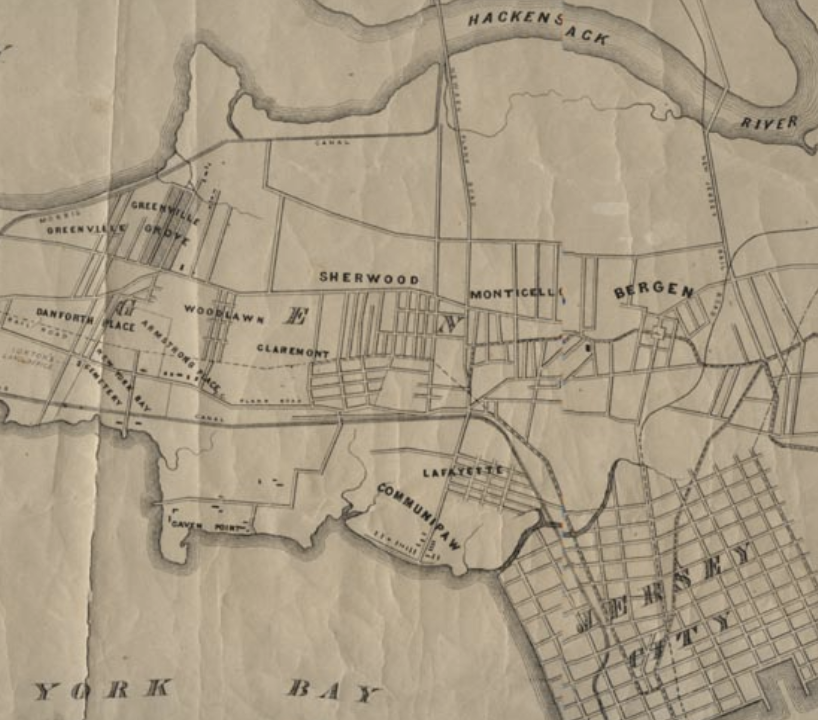

Route information
- Existed: 1850–present

Major junctions
- South end: Bergen Point, Bayonne, NJ
- North end: Paulus Hook, Jersey City, NJ

Location
- Country: United States
- State: New Jersey

Highway system
- Plank roads

The Jersey City and Bergen Point Plank Road was a road originally built in the 19th century in Hudson County, New Jersey, United States which ran between Paulus Hook and Bergen Point. The company that built the road received a charter on March 6, 1850 to improve one that had been built in the 18th century. It has subsequently become Grand Street and Garfield Avenue in Jersey City and Broadway in Bayonne. Plank roads were built during the 19th century, often by private companies as turnpike roads, in this case with a tollgate at Communipaw Junction. As the name suggests, wooden boards were laid on a roadbed in order to prevent horse-drawn carriages and wagons from sinking into softer ground on the portions of the road.

The road traveled from the waterfront of North River (Hudson River) at Paulus Hook to Communipaw Junction, where a toll was collected. It then ran parallel to the Morris Canal through Greenville to Curries Woods., passing through Bayview – New York Bay Cemetery. Crossing the canal at Pamrapo, it proceeded south into Saltersville and Centerville ending at Bergen Point. Transfer to ferries to Elizabethport across Newark Bay and to Staten Island across Kill van Kull were possible.

== See also ==
- Hackensack Plank Road
- Newark Plank Road
- Old Bergen Road
- Paterson Plank Road
- List of turnpikes in New Jersey
- Newark Bay, New Jersey rail accident
- Garfield Avenue (HBLR station)
