= St. Anthony of Padua Catholic Church =

Historic church in New Jersey, United States

- St. Anthony of Padua Roman Catholic Church
- U.S. National Register of Historic Places
- New Jersey Register of Historic Places
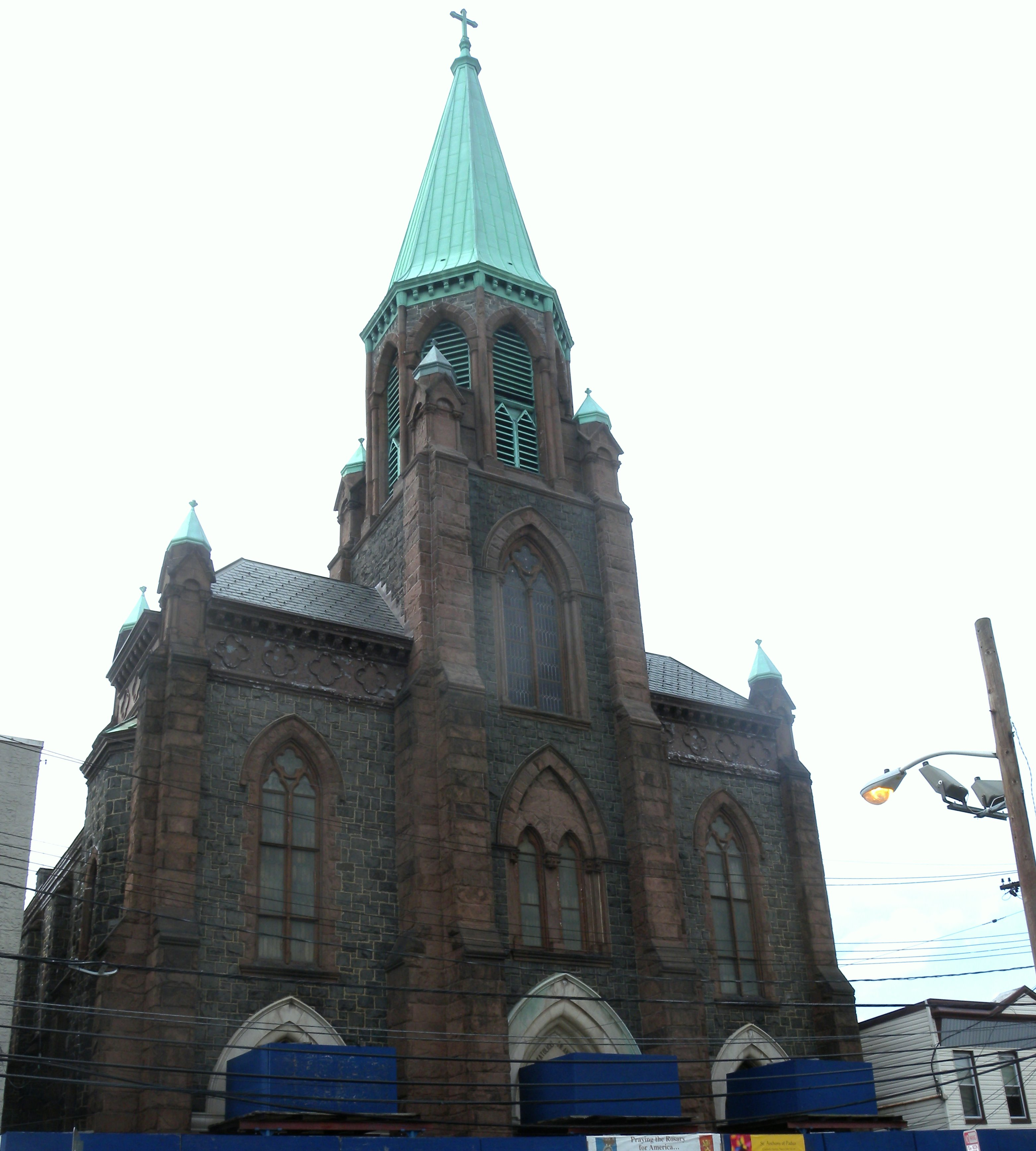

- Location within Hudson County, New Jersey Location within New Jersey Location within the United States
- Location: 457 Monmouth St., Jersey City, New Jersey
- Coordinates: 40°43′41″N 74°2′57″W
- Area: 0.3 acres (0.12 ha)
- Built: 1892
- Architect: Giele, Louis H.
- Architectural style: Gothic
- NRHP reference No.: 04000225
- NJRHP No.: 1528

Significant dates
- Added to NRHP: March 22, 2004
- Designated NJRHP: December 24, 2003

St. Anthony of Padua Catholic Church is a historic Catholic church in The Village section of Jersey City. It is best known for its former school and its boys' basketball program coached by Bob Hurley, Sr.

== History ==
Prior to church's construction, Polish parishioners in Jersey City had to take a ferry across to New York City to attend St. Stanislaus Church. The church was built in 1892 to serve what is now the oldest Polish-speaking parish in New Jersey. It was added to the National Register of Historic Places in 2004.

For much of its modern history it has been known for its former school, St. Anthony High School, and its historic basketball program coached by Bob Hurley, Sr.

== See also ==
- St. Anthony High School (New Jersey)
- White Eagle Hall
- National Register of Historic Places listings in Hudson County, New Jersey
