= Hackensack Plank Road =

Highway in New Jersey, United States

Coordinates: 40.762259°N 74.026372°W

Route information
- Existed: 1802–present
- Component highways: CR 691 from Hoboken to North Hudson; US 1-9; CR 124 from Fairview to Hackensack

Major junctions
- South end: Hoboken, NJ
- North end: Hackensack, NJ

Location
- Country: United States
- State: New Jersey

Highway system
- Plank roads

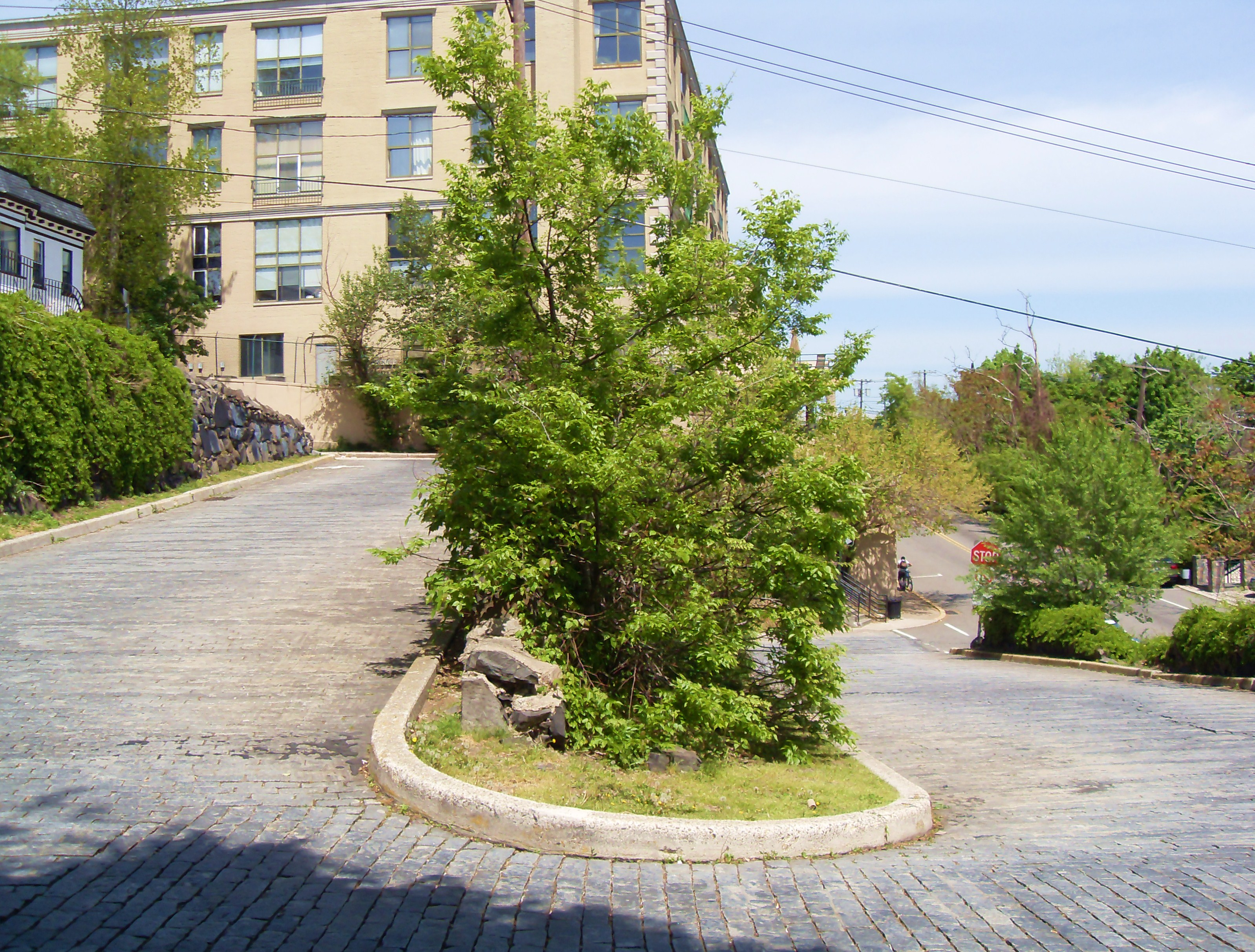
On Shippen Street off of Hackensack Plank Road

The Hackensack Plank Road, also known as Bergen Turnpike, was a major artery which connected the cities of Hoboken and Hackensack, New Jersey. Like its cousin routes, the Newark Plank Road and Paterson Plank Road, it travelled over Bergen Hill and across the Hackensack Meadows from the Hudson River waterfront to the city for which it was named. It was originally built as a colonial turnpike road as Hackensack and Hoboken Turnpike. The route mostly still exists today, though some segments are now called the Bergen Turnpike. It was during the 19th century that plank roads were developed, often by private companies which charged a toll. As the name suggests, wooden boards were laid on a roadbed in order to prevent horse-drawn carriages and wagons from sinking into softer ground on the portions of the road that passed through wetlands. The company that built the road received its charter on November 30, 1802. The road followed the route road from Hackensack to Communipaw that was described in 1679 as a "fine broad wagon-road."

== Hoboken and North Hudson ==
Today there is little or nothing to be seen of the plank road in Hoboken, the urban grid of the city having expanded westward across landfilled marshes; the alignment used to stretch from what is now the intersection of Washington and Eighth, to Park Avenue between 13th and 14th streets, to old 17th street between Grand and Adams streets. In North Hudson, the route begins today in lower Weehawken at the town line and rail tracks now used by the Hudson Bergen Light Rail. A short street connects it to Willow Avenue, which functions as a local entrance to the Lincoln Tunnel. The only segment that retains the name Hackensack Plank Road (and locally called the High Road), ascends the face of the Hudson Palisades to Weehawken Heights and upon reaching the top is designated County Route 691. It travels on a northwest diagonal across Union City as 32nd Street, passing over the Lincoln Tunnel Approach and Helix, intersecting Bergenline Avenue, and creating the terminus of Summit Avenue. Crossing Kennedy Boulevard at Schuetzen Park it enters North Bergen, New Jersey, and as Bergen Turnpike descends to pass Weehawken Cemetery, Palisade Cemetery, and near the site of the colonial-era Three Pigeons joins Tonnelle Ave. There the route heads north through New Durham and Bergenwood between the western slope of the palisades and the border of what has become the New Jersey Meadowlands District. The portion called Hackensack Plank Road is one of few roads which travel along the face of the Hudson Palisades escarpment, other being the Paterson Plank Road, the Wing Viaduct, Pershing Road, and Bulls Ferry Road. It is joined at its midpoint by what some have called the Lombard Street of the East Coast, Shippen Street, which has double hairpin turn descending to the plank road. A similar street, Mountain Road, is a single hairpin between Jersey City Heights and Hoboken.

In 1854, Nicholas Goelz and Peter Melcher changed the starting point of their stage coaches from West Hoboken, to the new settlement of Union Hill, north of West Hoboken, in order to meet the demand created by that new settlement, and used the Hackensack Plank Road as the route to the Hoboken ferry.

== Fairview and The Ridgefields ==
Crossing the Bergen line at the Fairview Cemetery, the road becomes County Route S124 and is named Broad Avenue. In Ridgefield the route travels west on Hendricks Causeway, which was built in the 1930s, and runs parallel to Edgewater Avenue, the original Bergen Turnpike. A short stretch, Motel Avenue, connects it to Bergen Turnpike which crosses Overpeck Creek into Ridgefield Park, where it ends at the river at the site of ferry landing and bridge, neither of which any longer exists.

== Little Ferry and Hackensack ==
Little Ferry takes its name from a colonial river crossing of the Hackensack River. In 1828, the first bridge over the Hackensack River was built. A wooden structure, it was replaced at the turn of the 20th century by the bridge which still stood before the erection of the present span. It was necessary to pay tolls on both the bridge and Bergen Turnpike until the start of the World War. In 1915, the Board of Chosen Freeholders took over the entire stretch of roadway from Fairview to Main Street, Hackensack. Public Service later became the owners of the bridge and retained the right of way along the turnpike for the operation of its trolleys. In 1934, after the present structure was completed the old historic bridge was torn down despite efforts of the local government and residents of Little Ferry to have it remain. Through the town the route retains the name Bergen Turnpike and its designation of County Route 124. At the city line, it becomes Hudson Street, where it continues north into downtown Hackensack, ending at the Bergen County Court House. Nearby is The Green, site of the colonial First Reformed Dutch Church and heart of the colonial city.

== See also ==
- Jersey City and Bergen Point Plank Road
- List of turnpikes in New Jersey
- New Jersey Route 18N
- Fairview Quarry
