= Paterson Plank Road =

Road in New Jersey, United States

Coordinates: 40°47′29.5″N 74°3′30″W

Paterson Plank Road

Route information
- Component highways: CR 601 from Paterson to Passaic; CR 120 from Wallington to East Rutherford; Route 120 in East Rutherford; CR 681 from Secaucus to Jersey City

Passaic / Bergen County segment
- West end: Temple Street / Presidential Boulevard in Paterson
- East end: Dead end in Carlstadt

Hudson County segment
- West end: Dead end in Secaucus
- East end: CR 681 in Jersey City

Location
- Country: United States
- State: New Jersey

Highway system
- New Jersey State Highway Routes; Interstate; US; State; Scenic Byways

Paterson Plank Road is a road that runs through Passaic, Bergen and Hudson Counties in northeastern New Jersey. The route, originally laid in the colonial era, connects the city of Paterson and the Hudson River waterfront. It has largely been superseded by Route 3, but in the many towns it passes it has remained an important local thoroughfare, and in some cases been renamed.

== History ==
Portions of the road were at times called New Barbadoes Turnpike, from New Barbadoes Neck, the name of the peninsula between the rivers it crossed, the Hackensack and the Passaic. Many plank roads in the United States were developed in the nineteenth century. These roads consisted of wooden boards laid adjacently to prevent coach and wagon wheels from getting bogged down in soft or swampy ground, thereby creating an even surface that would facilitate travel. Normally a toll was charged. This technology was applied to the Paterson Plank Road and similar roads, the Hackensack Plank Road and the Newark Plank Road, which also traversed the Hackensack Meadows to the cities for which they are named. The Bergen Point Plank Road travelled from Paulus Hook to the Kill Van Kull. The company which built the Paterson and New York Plank Road, as it was called, received its charter on March 14, 1851. Over time it was upgraded and at one point had streetcar lines on its entire length operated by the Public Service Railway as the 15 Passaic, 17 Hudson, and 35 Secaucus.

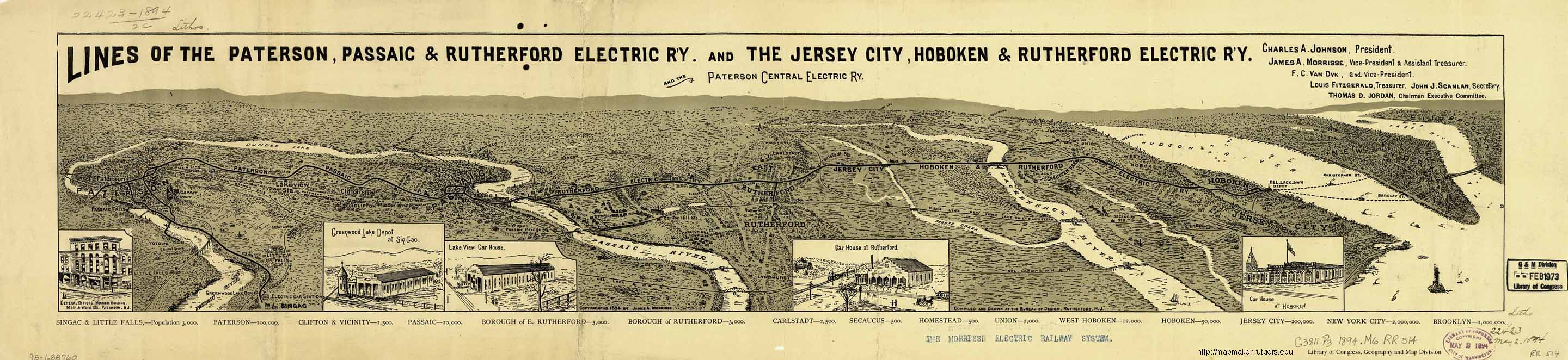
Panoramic map showing the rail system and the Hudson, Hackensack, and Passaic Rivers

== Passaic County ==
In Passaic County, Paterson Plank Road has become part of County Route 601, traveling southeast from downtown Paterson through the city through where it is known as Main Street, and becoming Main Avenue in Clifton and Passaic. The Clifton and Paterson sections of the road are never more than 2-3 blocks from the former railroad route Erie Railroad Main Line, much of the extra width of the street having been converted into vehicular parking. (The current New Jersey Transit Main Line is now located farther west.) This route passes high density commercial centers or the downtown of the three cities. A crossing of the Passaic River at the location was first created in the colonial era, and was known as Acquackanonk Bridge burned during Washington's 1776 great retreat from Fort Lee. Today's Gregory Avenue Bridge was built on a slightly different alignment.

== Bergen County ==
After crossing into Bergen County, the road is called Paterson Avenue and designated as County Route 120, through Wallington, residential and light density commercial. The road becomes the border between Wallington to the north and East Rutherford to the south. Shortly the end of Wallington is reached and Paterson Ave is then the border between Carlstadt and East Rutherford for a short distance but then the road dips into East Rutherford to avoid a hill (the bypass, which goes over the hill, is called Hoboken Road).

The road returns to its path along the Carlstadt-East Rutherford border at Route 17 which it crosses over via an overpass, and is then designated as Route 120 and Paterson Plank Road for a distance. This section of the highway is in the low-lying area known as the New Jersey Meadowlands, part of the floodplain of the Hackensack River. Originally this section consisted of planks laid side-to-side to form a makeshift road to prevent carriage wheels from getting stuck in the swamp, but it has since been reclaimed.

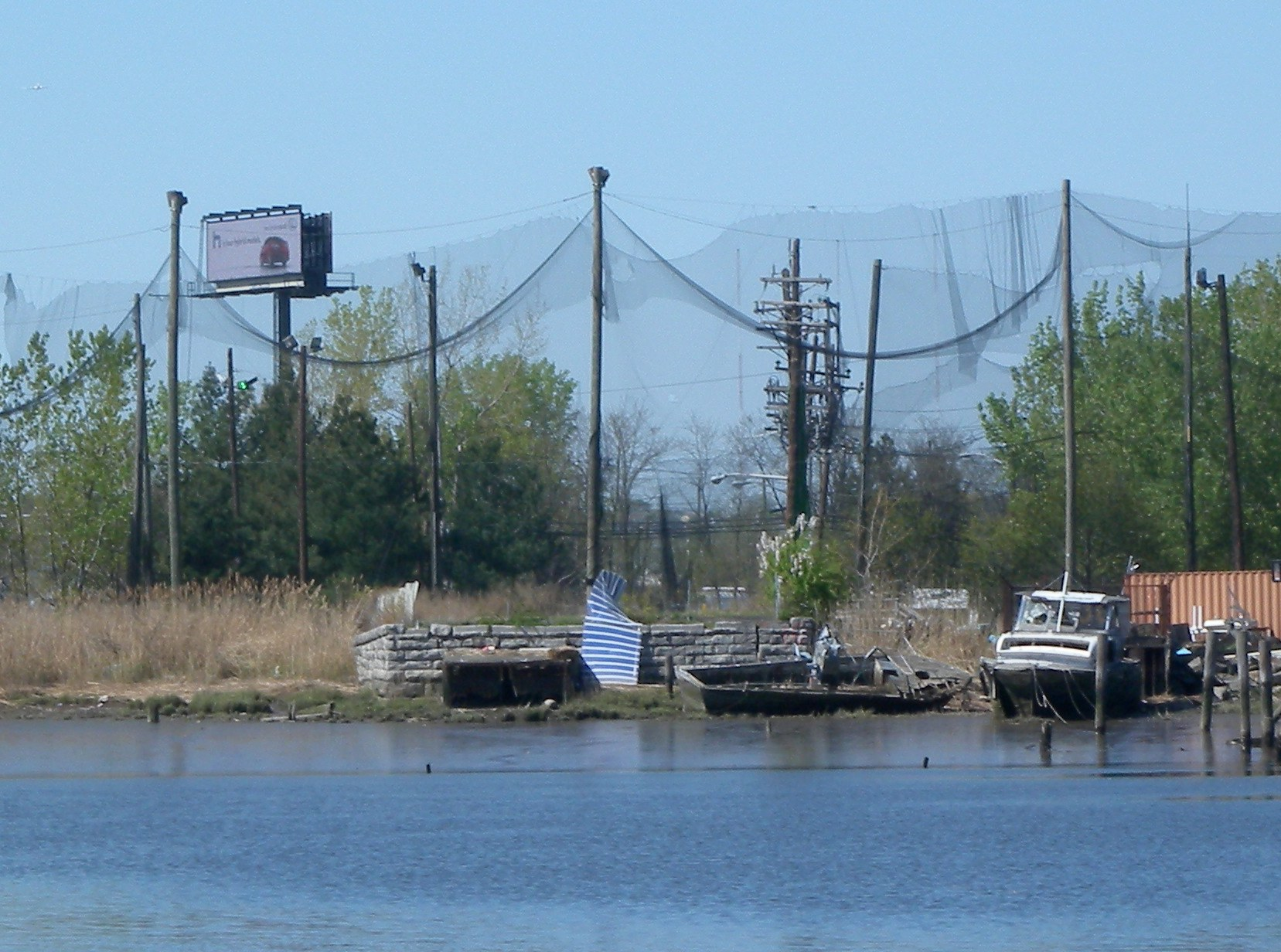
Remnant of Hackensack River bridge

Several new hotels, restaurants and nightclubs were built in anticipation of the increase in traffic from American Dream. The road passes to the north of the Meadowlands Sports Complex. The main road, Route 120, curves to the south to follow the eastern edge of the Sports Complex southward to NJ 3, but Paterson Plank Road continues eastward via an exit ramp. Shortly after crossing over the Western Spur of the New Jersey Turnpike it reaches the Hackensack River. The original bridge over the Hackensack River was destroyed by 1940. There was a proposal to rebuild the bridge as part of an extension to the Hudson–Bergen Light Rail, but this was superseded by the new Meadowlands Rail Line, which traverses the Hackensack River via the Berrys Creek railroad bridge.

== Hudson County ==
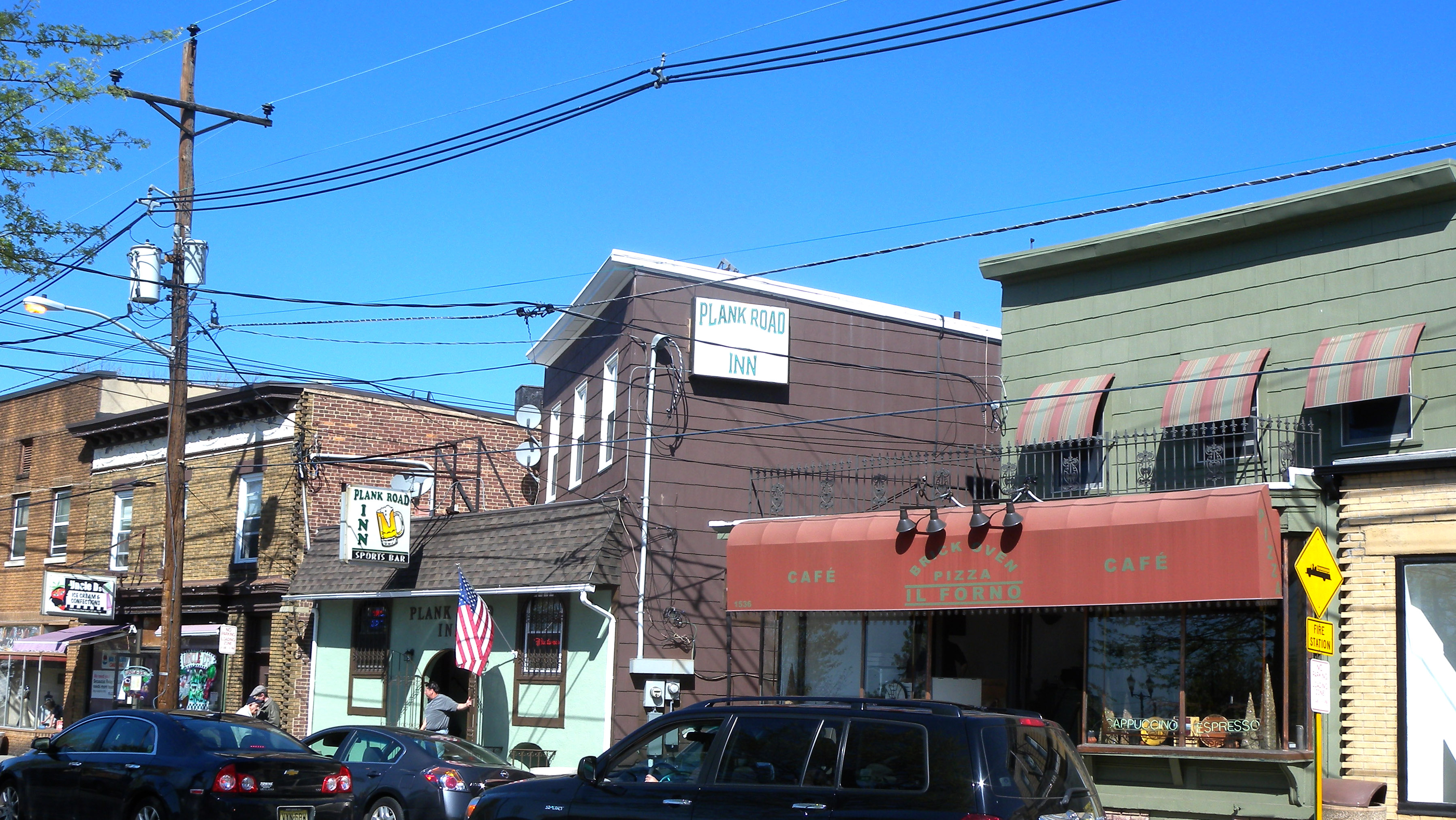
Plank Road Inn, Secaucus

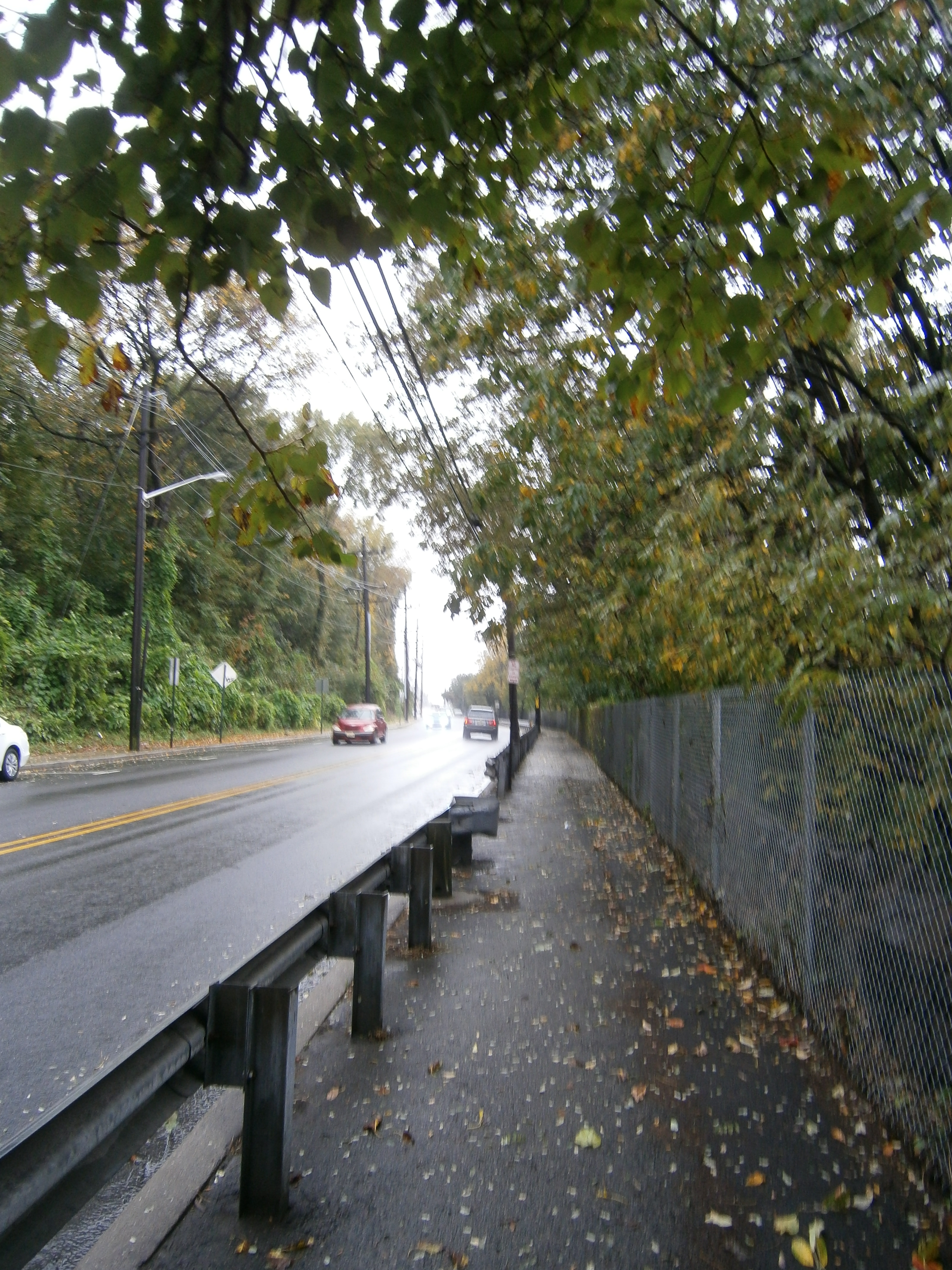
Ascending western slope of Palisades in North Bergen

The road picks up again in Hudson County in Secaucus and designated County Route 681. A small riverfront park, Trolley Park is so named for the cars of the Jersey City, Hoboken and Rutherford Electric Railway that passed or terminated there. There is a bus park-and-ride in the North End. The road travels mostly southward through the residential area until it crosses over NJ 3, and then turns southeast, forming the main street of Secaucus Plaza, the town's medium density central business district. The road crosses over Route 3 again, near another park-and-ride. It crosses over U.S. Route 1/9 (Tonnelle Ave) in North Bergen and turns sharply southward to parallel it and is even heading south-southwest as it climbs the west side New Jersey Palisades to Transfer Station. It then travels southeast through Washington Park creating a border between Union City and Jersey City Heights.

At the edge of the cliff turning south-southwest it is joined by the Wing Viaduct and descends the eastern side of the Palisades into Hoboken where it ends at Observer Highway. In 2009, a study was funded for exploring the re-routing of the road near its terminus. The last portion is one of the few roads that run along the face of the Hudson Palisades escarpment other being the Hackensack Plank Road, the Wing Viaduct, Pershing Road, Hillside Ave (Defino Way) and Bulls Ferry Road. Two streets join this part: Holland Street and Mountain Road, the latter making a smaller and larger hairpin turn between Jersey City Heights and Hoboken. (Shippen Street in Weehawken makes a double hairpin.) New Jersey Transit bus routes 82 and 85 make use of the road.

=== Major intersections ===
The entire route is in Hudson County.

Location	mi	km	Destinations	Notes
Secaucus	0.0	0.0	Dead end	Western terminus
Secaucus	0.6	0.97	Route 3 west – Clifton	Interchange
Secaucus	1.3	2.1	I-95 Toll south / N.J. Turnpike south	Westbound exit only; exit 16E on I-95 / Turnpike
Secaucus	1.7	2.7	Route 3 to N.J. Turnpike (I-95) – Secaucus	Interchange
North Bergen	2.2	3.5	US 1-9 / Union Turnpike	Interchange
Union City	3.7	6.0	CR 501 (Kennedy Boulevard)	
Union City	3.8	6.1	CR 617 (Summit Avenue)	
Jersey City	4.0	6.4	CR 663 south (Central Avenue)	Northern terminus of CR 663
Union City	4.3	6.9	CR 685 north (Palisade Avenue)	Southern terminus of CR 685
Union City	4.4	7.1	CR 683 north (South Wing Viaduct)	Southern terminus of CR 683
Jersey City	5.4	8.7	CR 681 east (Observer Highway)	Continuation east
1.000 mi = 1.609 km; 1.000 km = 0.621 mi: Incomplete access; Tolled

== See also ==
- List of turnpikes in New Jersey
- Jersey City, Hoboken and Rutherford Electric Railway
- List of crossings of the Hackensack River
