= Horseshoe, Jersey City =

Populated place in Hudson County, New Jersey, US

Coordinates: 40°43′52″N 74°02′31″W

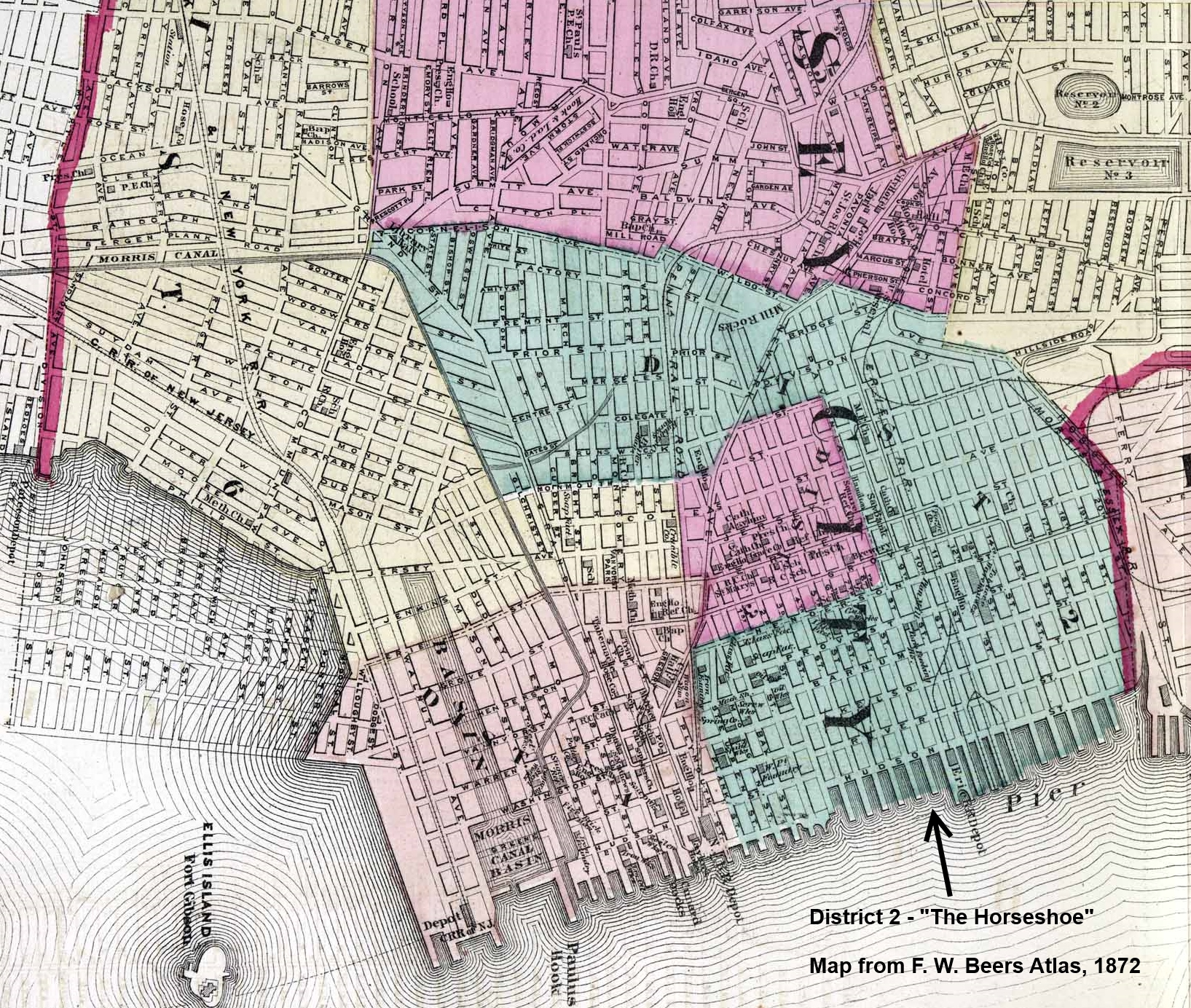
Map showing District 2 in 1872

The Horseshoe section of Jersey City, New Jersey, was the second ward, and was the home of the immigrants, tenements, and taverns. The Republican-controlled Legislature gerrymandered the district in 1871 to concentrate and isolate Democratic, and mostly Catholic, votes, thus preserving Republican dominance in the rest of the city. The curved shape of the district was said to resemble a horseshoe.

As competing railroads built cuts through Bergen Hill, they also built viaducts from the foot of the cliff which passed through residential districts to the waterfront. The district is often associated with the name Pavonia encompassing Harsimus Cove, Hamilton Park, Powerhouse and the former site of the Erie Railroad's Hudson waterfront Pavonia Terminal and the Pavonia Ferry, which since the 1980s has been redeveloped as Newport. Frank Hague was born in the Horseshoe, and used it as his power base to become mayor of Jersey City and influential in local, state, and national politics.
