= Hamilton Park, Jersey City =

Populated place in Hudson County, New Jersey, US

- Hamilton Park Historic District
- U.S. National Register of Historic Places
- U.S. Historic district
- New Jersey Register of Historic Places
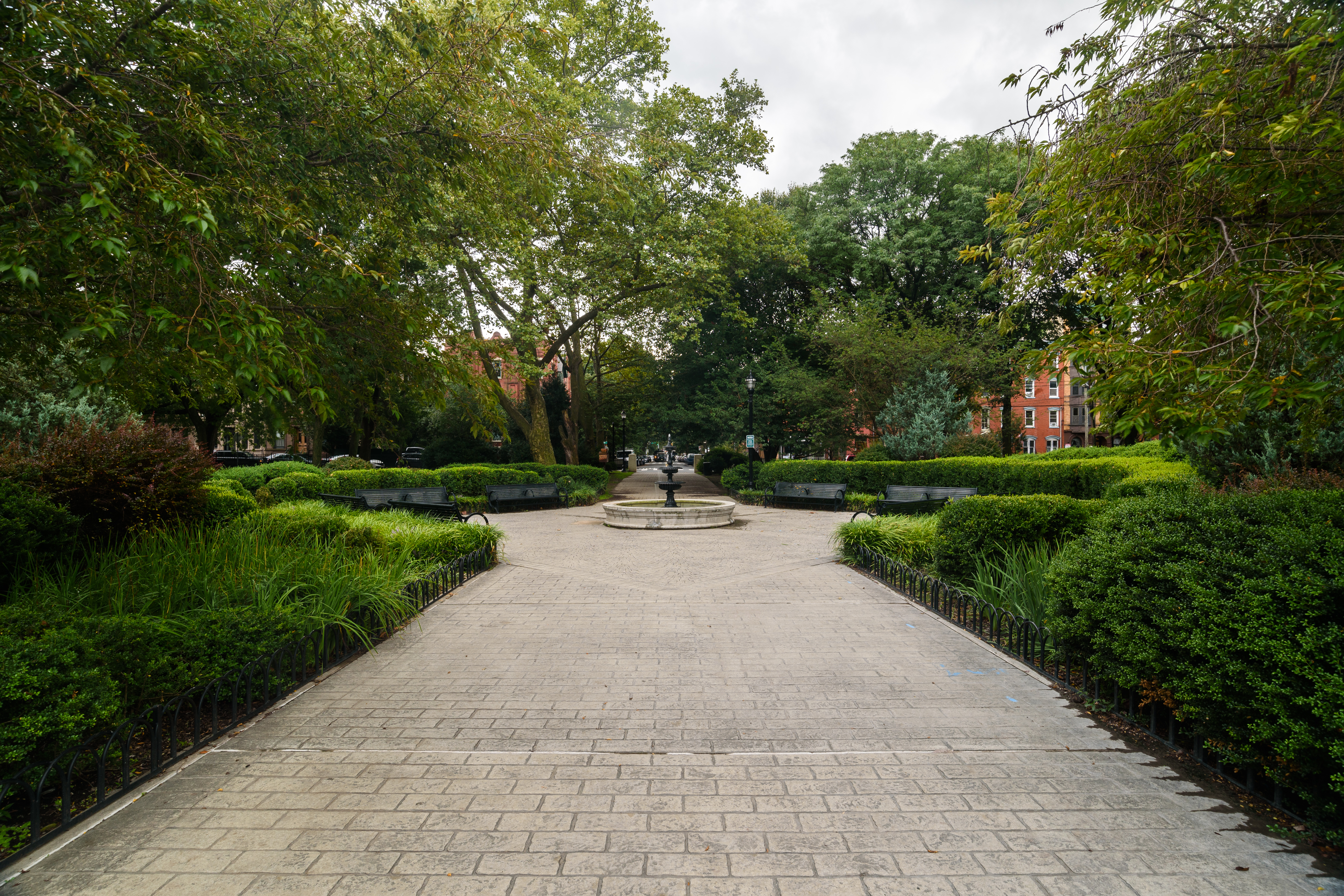
- View to the south

- Location within Hudson County, New Jersey Location within New Jersey Location within the United States
- Location: Roughly bounded by Brunswick, Grove, 6th, and 9th Streets, Jersey City, New Jersey
- Coordinates: 40°43′39″N 74°2′42″W
- Area: 42 acres (17 ha)
- Architectural style: Late Victorian
- NRHP reference No.: 79001493
- NJRHP No.: 1507

Significant dates
- Added to NRHP: January 25, 1979
- Designated NJRHP: April 27, 1978

Hamilton Park is a neighborhood in Historic Downtown Jersey City, Hudson County, in the U.S. state of New Jersey, centered on a park with the same name. Hamilton Park is located west of Newport, north of Harsimus Cove, north and east of The Village and south of Boyle Plaza. The Victorian age park is located between Eighth Street and Ninth Street and Hamilton Place on the west and McWilliams Place on the East. Like the Van Vorst Park neighborhood to the south, this quiet park is surrounded by nineteenth century brownstones. The park underwent renovations completed in 2010.

== Programs ==
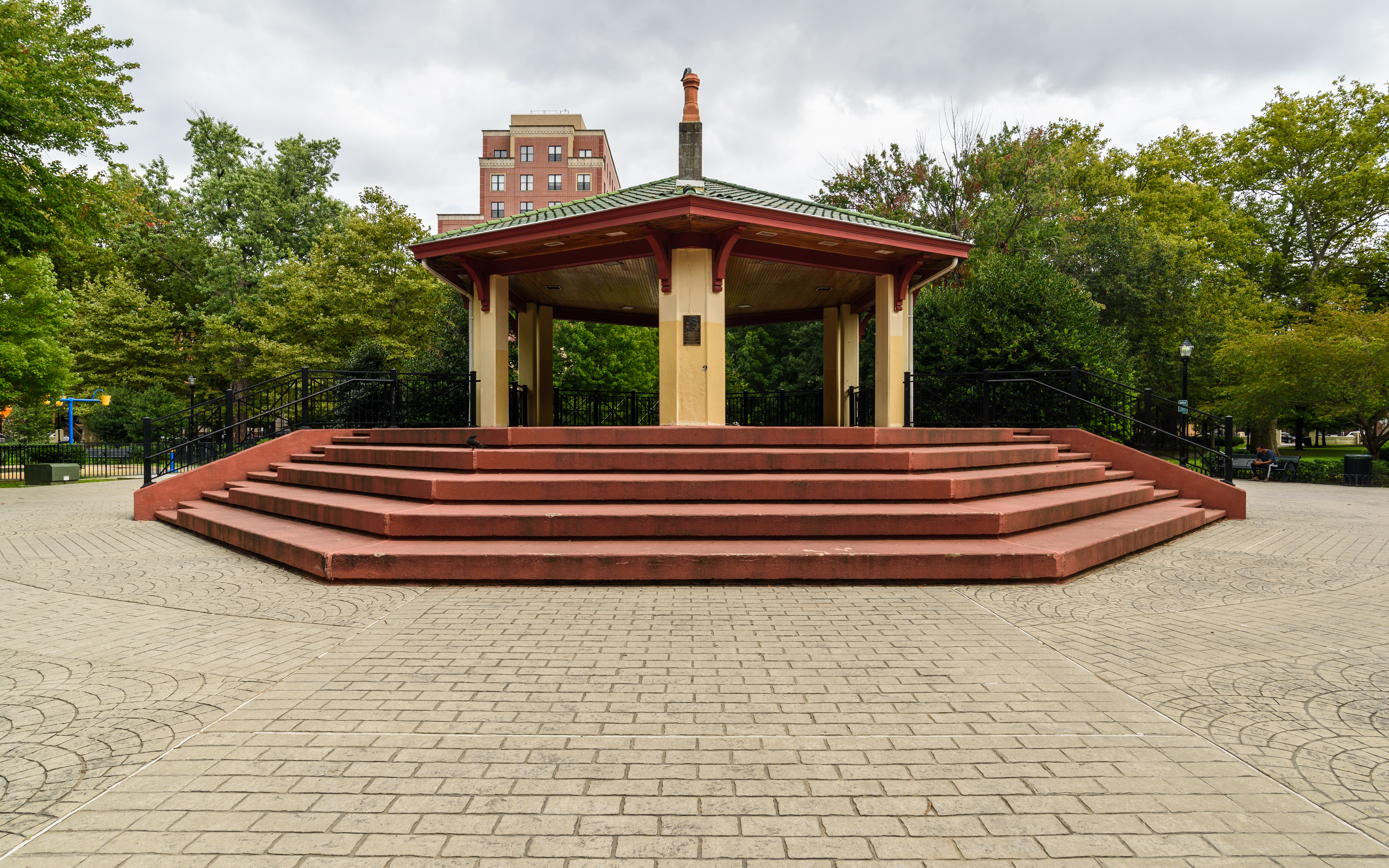
Gazebo viewed from the west

The park produces several events throughout the year, some of which include

- A Shakespeare in the Park series by the Hudson Shakespeare Company. The professional company produces one Shakespeare or classical show for each summer month. This is paid for by the Hamilton Park Neighborhood Association and is free to watch
- Movies in the Park, a series of outdoor screening of 4 to 5 movies in the months of June or July thru October, paid for by the Hamilton Park Neighborhood Association and is free to watch
- Hamilton Park Festival – Takes place usually in early June of each year and is paid for by the Hamilton Park Neighborhood Association.
- Youth Festival – Takes place usually in June
- Weekly Farmers Market – Takes place every Wednesday, produced by the Hamilton Park Neighborhood Association
- Easter Egg Hunt - Takes place in April.
- Zombie Opera - A production done by the Undead Arts, usually happens around Halloween.

== See also ==
- Harsimus Stem Embankment
- The Horseshoe
- The Lembeck and Betz Eagle Brewing Company
- List of neighborhoods in Jersey City, New Jersey
- National Register of Historic Places listings in Hudson County, New Jersey
