= Plank road =

Road composed of wooden planks or puncheon logs

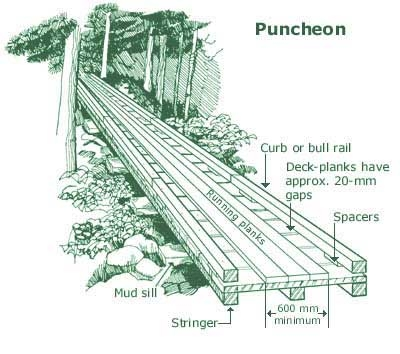
Diagram of a plank road

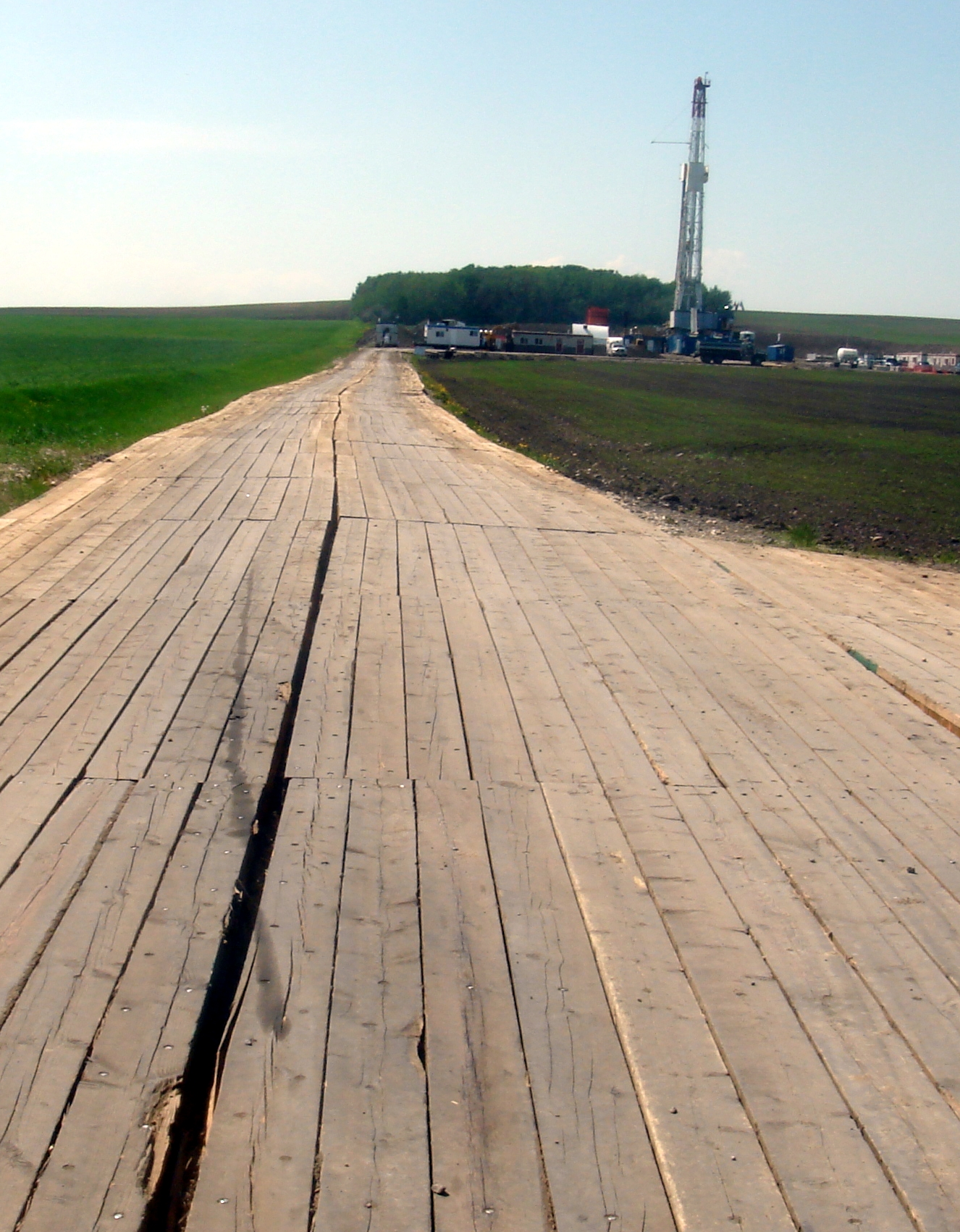
A wood mat road in British Columbia, used for temporary access over soft ground

A plank road is a road composed of wooden planks or puncheon logs, as an efficient technology for traversing soft, marshy, or otherwise difficult ground. Plank roads have been built since antiquity, and were commonly found in the Canadian province of Ontario as well as the Northeast and Midwest of the United States in the first half of the 19th century. They were often built by turnpike companies.

== Origins ==
The Wittmoor bog trackway is the name given to each of two historic plank roads or boardwalks, trackway No. I being discovered in 1898 and trackway No. II in 1904 in the Wittmoor bog in northern Hamburg, Germany. The trackways date to the 4th and 7th century AD, both linked the eastern and western shores of the formerly inaccessible, swampy bog. A part of the older trackway No. II dating to the period of the Roman Empire is on display at the permanent exhibition of the Archaeological Museum Hamburg in Harburg, Hamburg.

This type of plank road is known to have been used as early as 4,000 BC with, for example, the Post Track found in the Somerset levels near Glastonbury, England. This type of road was also constructed in Roman times.

== In North America ==
From the mid-1840s and to mid 1850s, the United States experienced the Plank Road Boom and a subsequent bust. The first plank road in the US was built in North Syracuse, New York, to transport salt and other goods; it appears to have copied earlier roads in Canada, which had copied Russian ones. The plank road boom, like many other early technologies, promised to transform the way people lived and worked and led to permissive changes in legislation seeking to spur development, speculative investment by private individuals, etc. Ultimately, the technology failed to live up to its promise, and millions of dollars in investments evaporated almost overnight.

Three plank roads, the Hackensack, the Paterson, and the Newark, were major arteries in northern New Jersey. The roads travelled over the New Jersey Meadowlands, connecting the cities for which they were named to the Hudson River waterfront.

U.S. Route 1 in Virginia follows the Boydton Plank Road from Petersburg southwards to just north of the North Carolina line.

On the U.S. West Coast the Canyon Road of Portland, Oregon was another important but short artery and was built between 1851 and 1856.

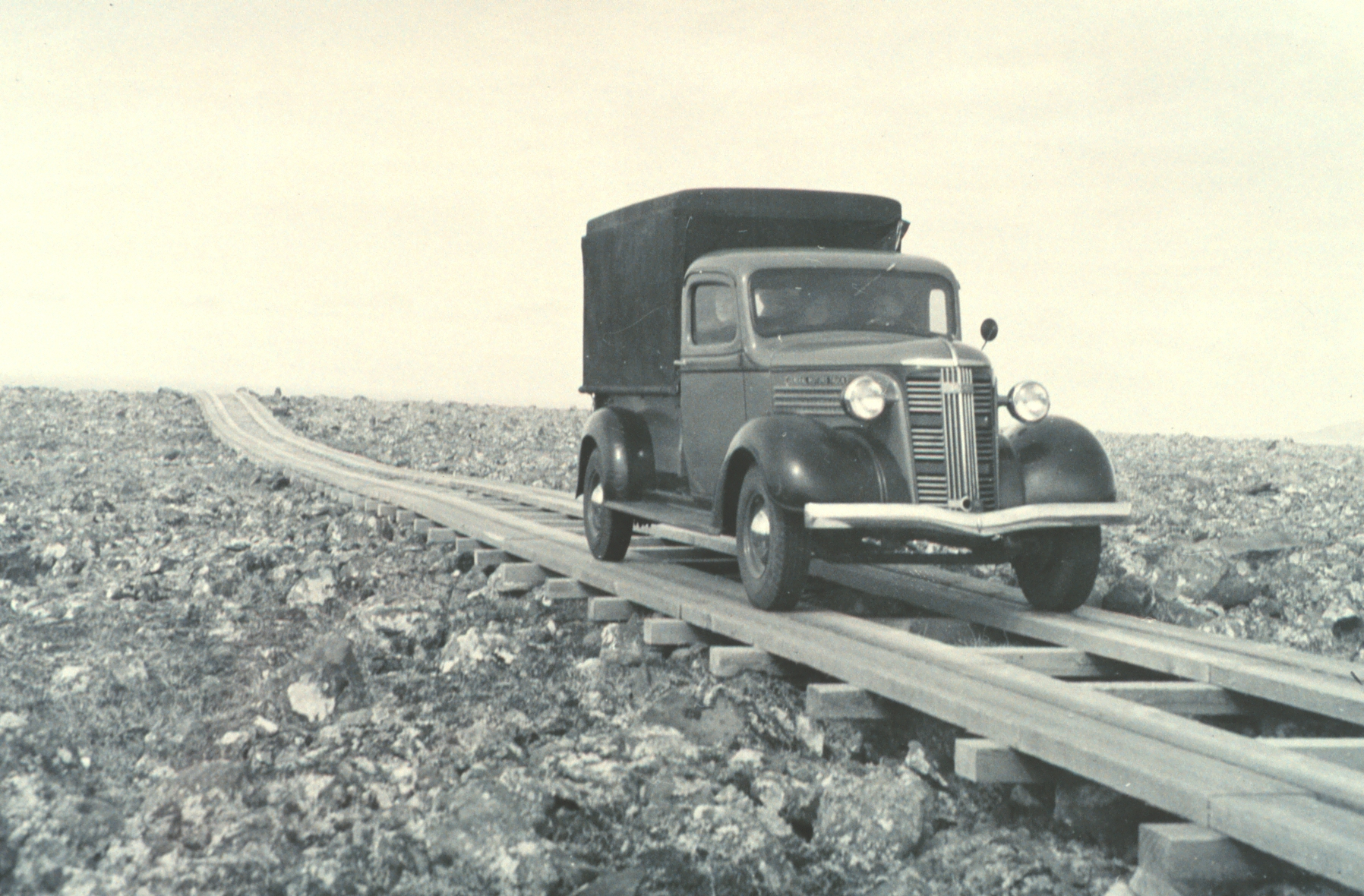
A plank road on one of the Pribilof Islands, Alaska

Kingston Road (Toronto) (Governor's Road) and Danforth Avenue, in Toronto, were plank roads built by the Don and Danforth Plank Road Company in the late 18th and the early 19th centuries. Highway 2 from Toronto eastwards was a plank road in the 19th century that was later paved. In 1833 Scarborough-Markham Plank Road was authorized to build a road from Danforth Road to Highway 7 to Ringwood and east on Stouffville Road to Main Street Stouffville.

Plank roads are used exclusively in the Canadian fishing outport of Harrington Harbour, Quebec because the town is built directly over a hilly, rocky shore. ATVs are the only mode of transportation there.

== In Australia ==
In Perth, Western Australia, plank roads were important in the early growth of the agricultural and outer urban areas because of the distances imposed by swamps and the relatively-infertile soil. As it cost £2,000/km to construct roads by conventional means, the local councils, known as road boards, were experimenting with cheaper approaches to road building. A method called Jandakot Corduroy had been developed at Jandakot south-east of Perth: a jarrah tramway lay upon 2.3-metre-long (7.5 ft) sleepers, bounded by two 70-centimetre-wide (28 in) strips of jarrah planks for cart and carriage wheels. The 90-centimetre (35 in) gap was filled with limestone rubble to be used by horses. This reduced the cost of road building by up to 85% after its widespread introduction in 1908. However, increased traffic and suburban development rendered the routes unsatisfactory over time, and by the 1950s, they had been replaced with bitumen surfaced roads.

== See also ==
- Board track racing
- Boardwalk
- Corduroy road
- Gallery road
- Historic roads and trails
- Marston Mat - a 20th-century equivalent for airport runways
- Old Plank Road (California)
- Old Plank Road Trail
- Sweet Track and Post Track
- List of plank roads in New York
