= 14th Street (Hoboken) =

County highway in Hudson County, New Jersey, United States

Coordinates: 40.754°N 74.030°W

- 14th Street Viaduct
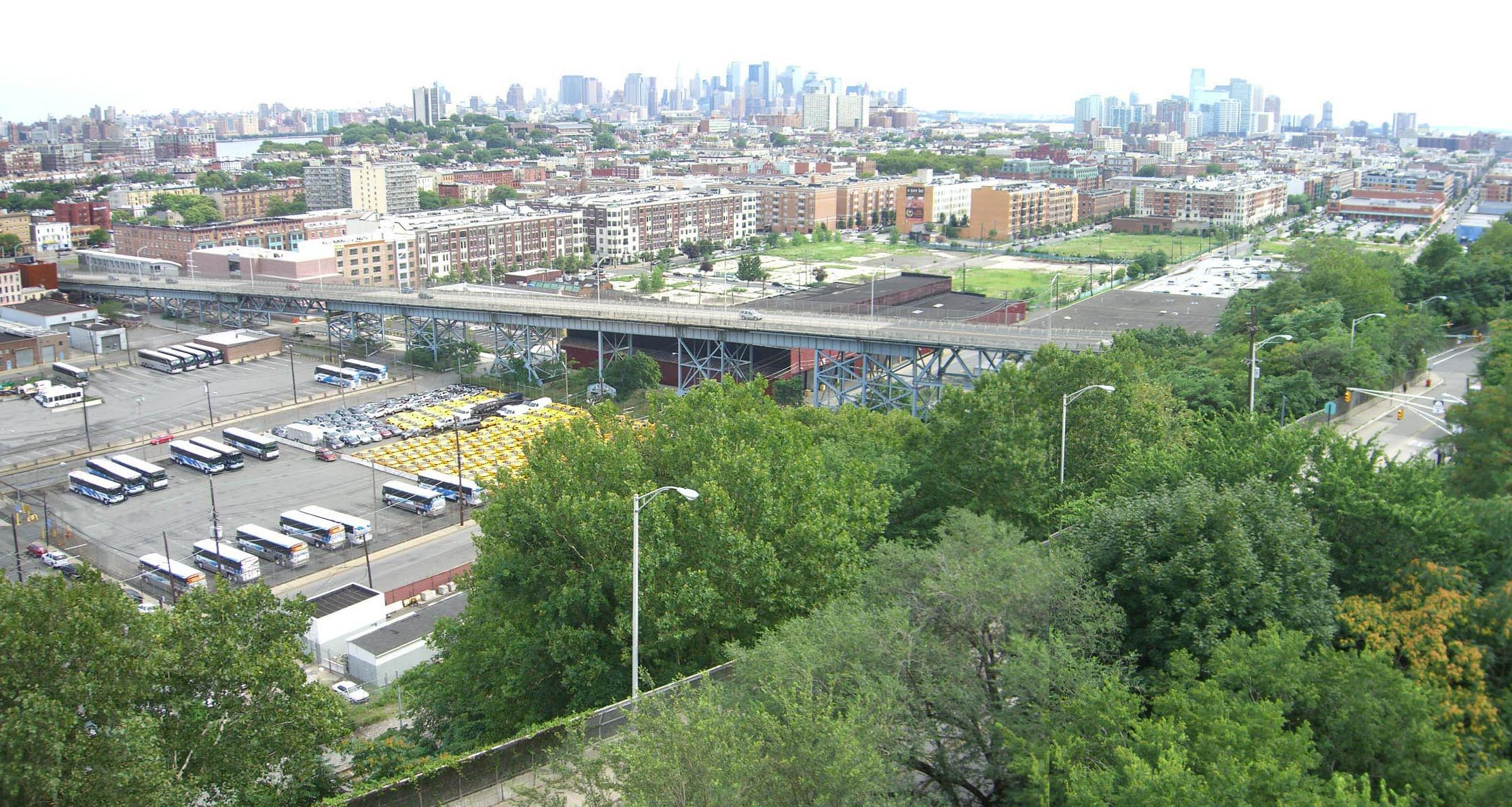
- The 14th Street Viaduct and Wing Viaduct connecting Hoboken, Union City, and Jersey City Heights
- Interactive map of 14th Street
- Part of: CR 670
- Length: 0.66 mi (1.06 km)
- Location: Hoboken and Union City, Hudson County, New Jersey
- West end: CR 683 in Union City
- East end: Sinatra Drive in Hoboken
- North: 15th Street
- South: 13th Street

Construction
- Completion: 1908 (viaduct)

14th Street is a county highway in Hudson County, New Jersey, designated County Route 670. It begins at an intersection with Manhattan Avenue in Union City, also known as the South Wing Viaduct, and proceeds east over the 14th Street Viaduct to terminate at Sinatra Drive on the banks of the Hudson River in Hoboken. It is located at the northern end of Hoboken's street grid, and one of the only east–west streets in the city that allows for two-way traffic. It is located two blocks south of Weehawken Cove.

== The Viaduct ==
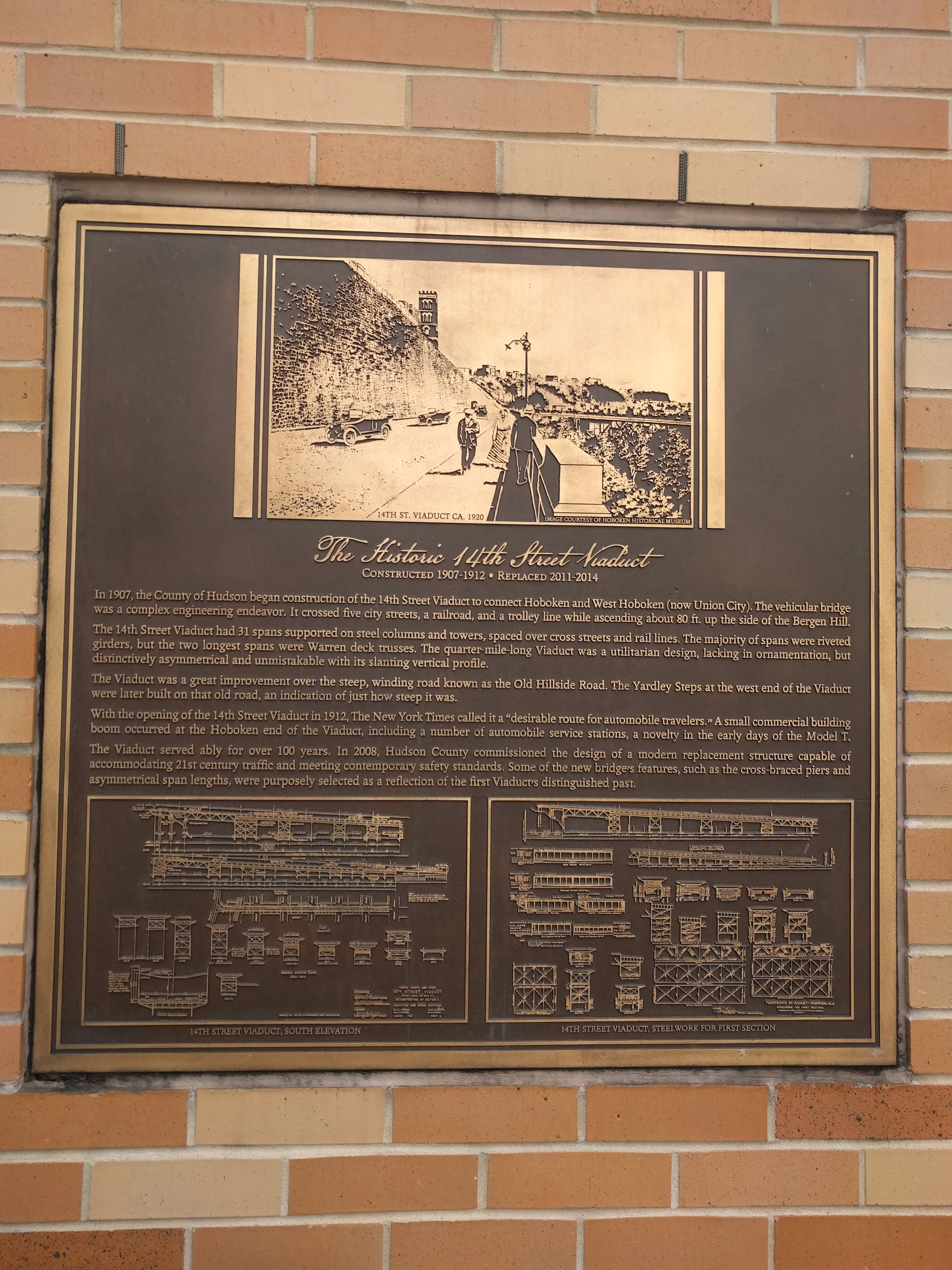
A plaque on the bridge, added after the 2011 construction

The four lane 14th Street Viaduct begins at the intersection of Willow Avenue, and travels perpendicular to the Hudson Palisades in Union City. It ascends to connect to the Wing Viaduct (which is designated as CR 683), which runs along the face of the cliff. Portions of the massive retaining wall were originally parts of the North Hudson County Railway's Hillside Line. At its summit the south wing becomes Paterson Plank Road in Jersey City Heights, while the north wing rises to Manhattan Avenue and Mountain Road. Just north of its lower end is the Willow Avenue Viaduct, which travels over the Hudson Bergen Light Rail and serves local as well as Lincoln Tunnel-bound traffic.

The 1,460 foot-long Viaduct was constructed in 1908, and provided a road for horses and carriages. It is estimated that that Viaduct carries approximately 20,000 vehicles daily. It does not have a designated bike lane, but does include a sidewalk and small shoulder on its southern side.

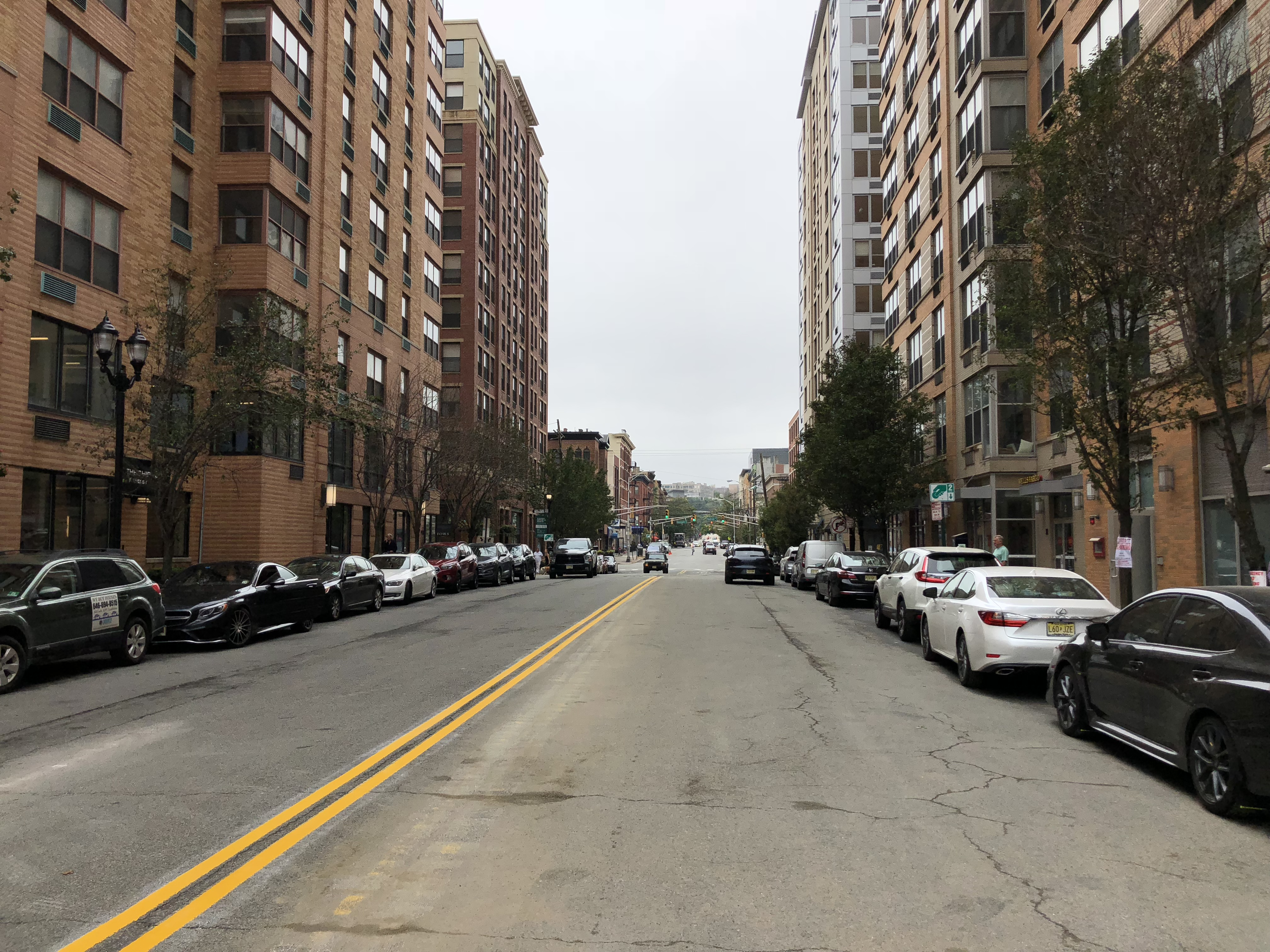
14th Street looking west to Palisades

Plans were unveiled for improvements to the area beneath the bridge on September 7, 2010, which include a dog run, playground, raised sidewalks and narrower streets for improved pedestrian safety, a block of active recreation space with a multi-use court and two blocks of multi-purpose space that can be used for farmer's markets and other community purposes. The plans also include the closing of east-west blocks of South Marginal Street to vehicular traffic, which was already done with the street in front of the Clearview Cinemas that opened just south of the Viaduct's span in 2009. The plans were part of a $55 million federally funded improvement project for Hudson County that was spurred by the 2007 collapse of the I-35W Mississippi River bridge in Minneapolis, Minnesota. Limits on the reconstruction were imposed by the New Jersey State Historic Preservation Office, due to the structure's historic significance. The restoration of the Viaduct is also attributed as the cause of the increased development in the area of Washington Park in Union City and Ogden Avenue in Jersey City, which to which South Wing of the Viaduct lead via Manhattan Avenue. Projects are also being developed at the foot of the Viaduct, including retail and residential construction, and at other areas near the Viaduct that were previously occupied by manufacturing and warehousing facilities.

The renovation's completion was delayed by Superstorm Sandy, but nonetheless completed before the revised, post-Sandy deadline of August 2014. A ceremony was held on July 7, 2014 to mark the completion of work on the Viaduct. Mayor Dawn Zimmer, Senator Robert Menendez, and several other mayors and dignitaries were to be on hand to celebrate the completed renovation. The completed viaduct opened on July 21, though some elements of the renovation were to be completed past this date, such as Wi-Fi-connected security cameras above and below the structure, accessible by the police departments of Hoboken, Union City and Jersey City, as well as the Hudson County Sheriff's office.

In June 2022, Bike Hudson County and other activists began a petition to have a protected multi-use bike lane designated on the Viaduct. During installation of protective railings on the sidewalk in July 2022, sand barrels placed as barriers to protect the construction were hit by cars, which Bike County Hudson pointed to as evidence of the need for a separate bike lane. On September 28, Union City Mayor Brian P. Stack formally announced his support for the proposal, joining County Commissioner Fanny Cedeno, who represented Union City and Jersey City Heights, and Jersey City Mayor Steven Fulop.

== Transportation ==
New Jersey Transit operates bus routes 22, 89 (to North Hudson) 119 and 126 (to Port Authority Bus Terminal) along the street.

A ferry operated from the foot of 14th Street from 1886 to 1942, running to 14th Street or 23rd Street in Manhattan. It was later replaced by a Bethlehem Shipyard drydock. In 2001 ferry service was restored. Operated by NY Waterway, daily service runs to the West Midtown Ferry Terminal (with some trips via Lincoln Harbor), and additional weekday peak service runs to the Battery Park City and Wall Street ferry terminals.

== Major intersections ==
The entire route is in Hudson County.

Location	mi	km	Destinations	Notes
Union City	0.00	0.00	South Wing Viaduct (CR 683) – Union City, Jersey City	Western terminus
Hoboken	0.00– 0.30	0.00– 0.48	14th Street Viaduct over the Hudson–Bergen Light Rail	
Hoboken	0.40	0.64	Willow Avenue (CR 675)	
Hoboken	0.45	0.72	Park Avenue (CR 677)	
Hoboken	0.50	0.80	Garden Street (CR 673 south)	
Hoboken	0.60	0.97	Hudson Street (CR 679 south)	
Hoboken	0.66	1.06	Sinatra Drive	Eastern terminus
1.000 mi = 1.609 km; 1.000 km = 0.621 mi

== See also ==
- List of bridges, tunnels, and cuts in Hudson County, New Jersey
- Mountain Road: A single hairpin turn road between Jersey City Heights and Hoboken
- Boulevard East
- Pershing Road
- Shippen Street
- Gorge Road
- Bulls Ferry Road
