= Newark Plank Road =

Former road in New Jersey, US

Coordinates: 40.73393°N 74.14462°W

The Newark Plank Road was a major artery between Hudson Waterfront at Paulus Hook (in today's Jersey City) and city of Newark further inland across the New Jersey Meadows. As its name suggests, a plank road was constructed of wooden planks laid side-to-side on a roadbed. Similar roads, the Bergen Point Plank Road, the Hackensack Plank Road and Paterson Plank Road, traveled to the locales for which they are named. The name is no longer used, the route having been absorbed into other streets and freeways.

In 1765, an act of the Assembly of the Province of New Jersey stated:

A road from New-Ark to the publick road in the town of Bergen, leading to Poulos Hook, and establishing ferries over the two small rivers, Passaick and Hackensack, which makes the distance from Poulus Hook to New-Ark eight miles, and will be a level and good road when the cause-ways are made; and as said road will be very commodious for travelers, and give a short and easy access of a large country to the markets of the city of New-York and be of a general benefit both to city and country, it is hoped they will unite in the necessary expence of rendering said road for travellers and carriages, more especially since by said law the publick interest alone is regarded.

A corporation sanctioned by the legislation to build a road and bridges over the Hackensack River and Passaic River as part of the developing colonial road network in New Jersey was established. Initially ferry service was instituted at the river crossings which operated until the bridges were completed in 1795.

A charter to operate the road was granted on February 24, 1849, and it was renamed Newark Plank Road. By 1869 Central Railroad of New Jersey's Newark and New York Railroad was running trains that mirrored the route, using the PD Draw and HD Draw. (The right of way through Bergen Hill is now used by Hudson-Bergen Light Rail West Side Branch). Public Service Railway Lines #1 ran along much of route until bustitution was implemented, keeping the old number now used by New Jersey Transit as part of the #1 bus route.

== Jersey City ==
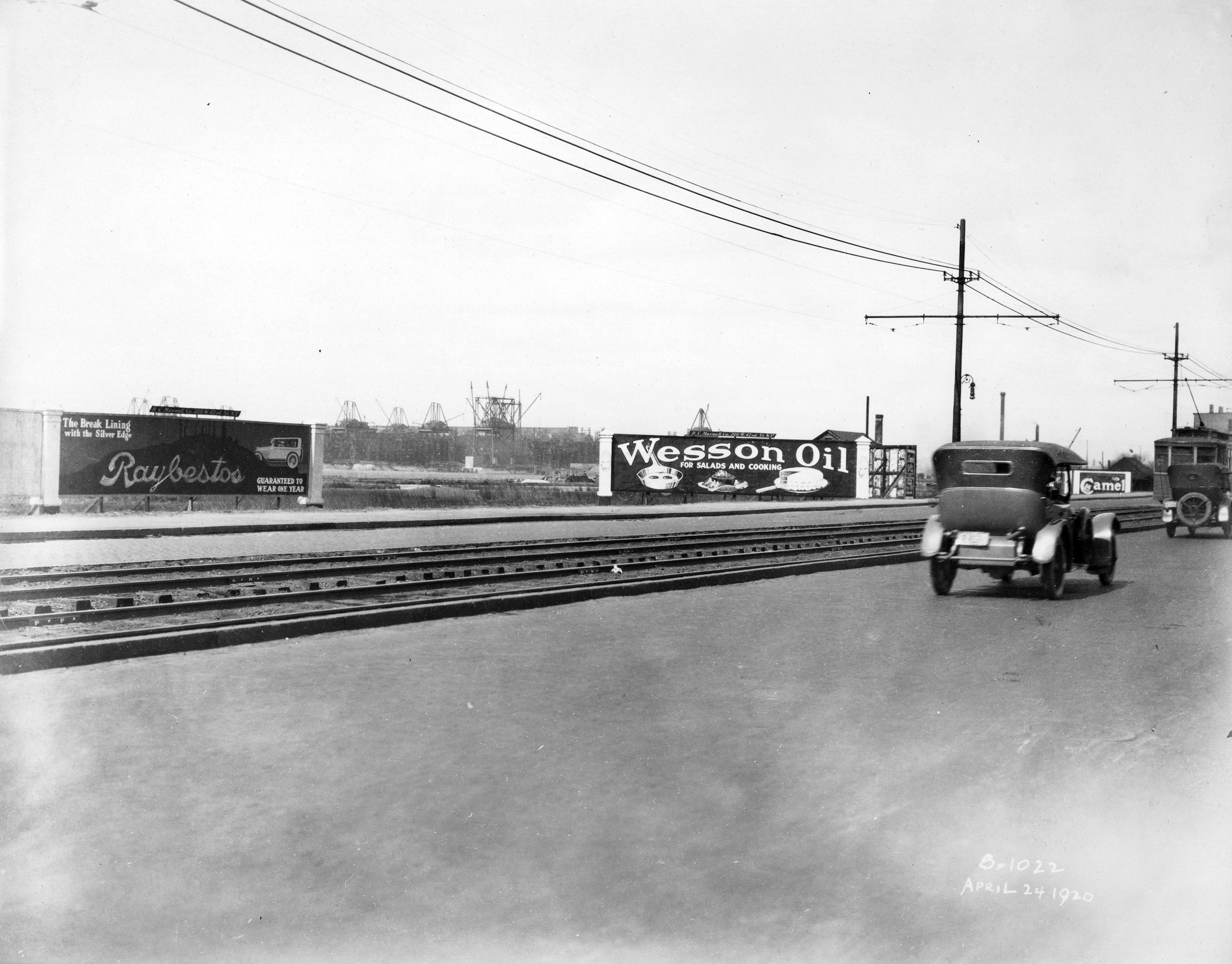
Approaching the Hackensack River

The Newark Plank Road begins at the Hudson River on Grand Street, where a ferry took travelers to New York. The road then follows the course of Grand Street (CR 622) and Communipaw Avenue (CR 612) before crossing the Hackensack River on U.S. Route 1/9 Truck. After 1913, the bridge and its approach became part of the Lincoln Highway, one of the first transcontinental automobile routes across the United States.

== Kearny Point ==
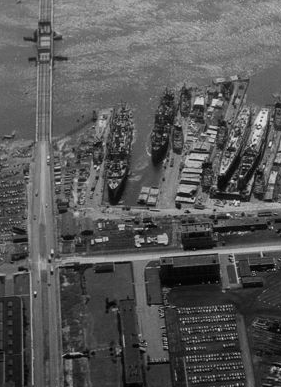
1945 view with Federal Shipbuilding and Drydock Company at right

After crossing the Hackensack River on the Lincoln Highway Hackensack River Bridge the road traverses Kearny Point, the southern tip of New Barbadoes Neck where the Hackensack and Passaic River meet. It ran parallel to the Morris Canal. It crosses the Lincoln Highway Passaic River Bridge. This section was part the transcontinental Lincoln Highway and retains that name.

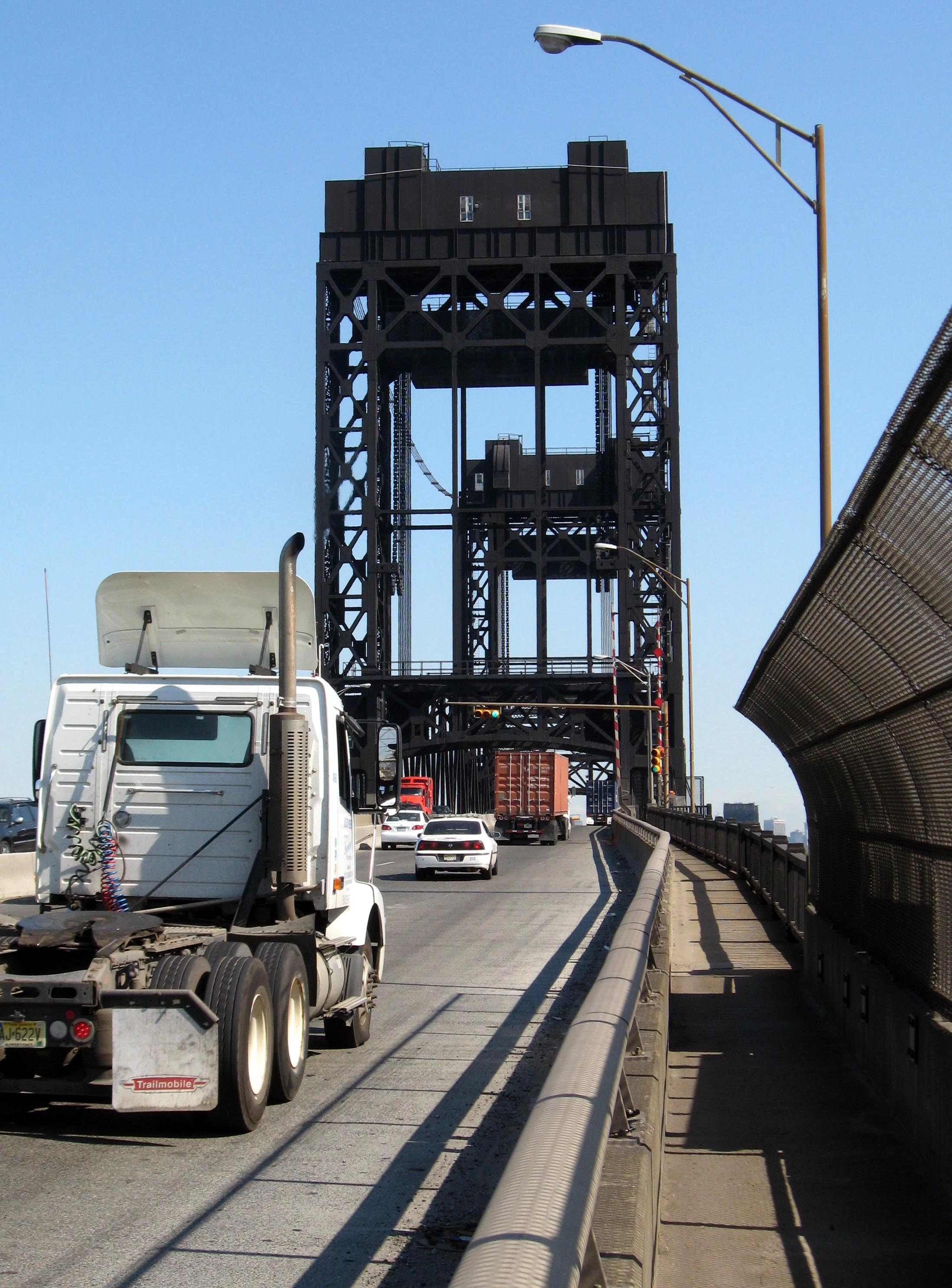
Modern bridge over Passaic River

== Newark ==
Ferry Street in the Ironbound section of Newark was part of the plank road, named after the ferry that would travel between Newark and points east. In 1849, "The Newark Plank Road Company" was hired to fix the road with planks for smoother travel. Ferry Street was then changed to "Plank Road." It was not completed within the fifty-year charter that it was given to accomplish the work. A legal dispute arose and the Hudson County section changed "Plank Road" to the Lincoln Highway while the Essex County section was changed back to "Ferry Street."

== See also ==
- List of crossings of the Hackensack River
- List of crossings of the Lower Passaic River
- List of turnpikes in New Jersey
- List of county routes in Hudson County, New Jersey
- Bergen Point Plank Road
- Old York Road
