= Peter Stuyvesant Monument =

Coordinates: 40.7322°N 74.0645°W

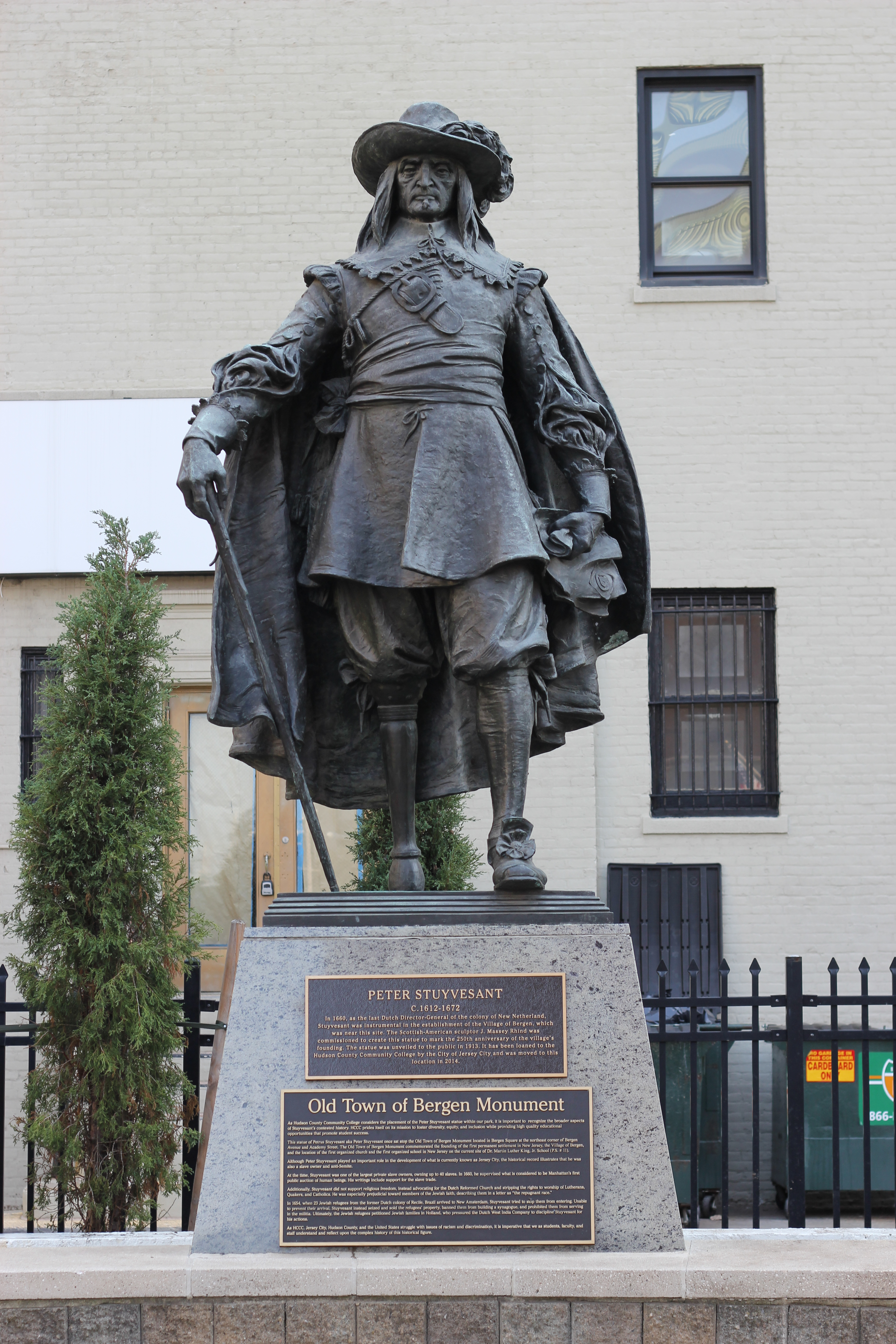
- Year: 1913
- Type: Bronze
- Location: near Bergen Square; Jersey City, New Jersey

The Peter Stuyvesant Monument is a memorial to Peter Stuyvesant and the establishment of settlement of Bergen, New Netherlands in 1660. It is located at Journal Square district of Jersey City, New Jersey. The statue of Stuyvesant by J. Massey Rhind was originally installed in 1913 at Bergen Square. The statue and pedestal were unceremoniously removed in 2010. In 2014, the statue was restored and placed at nearby park in anticipation that a new pedestal would be built at the original location.

== Significance ==
Bergen Square and surrounding streets are the site of what is considered to be the oldest chartered municipality in the state of New Jersey, which at the time was part of the province of New Netherland. While the area had been settled as early as the 1630s, first charter was granted by the Director-General of New Netherland, Petrus Stuyvesant in 1660 as Bergen. In 1683, became it became Bergen Township.

== Original dedication ==
A statue of Stuyvesant by J. Massey Rhind was situated on Bergen Square to commemorate the 250th anniversary of the establishment of Bergen. The square had originally been surveyed and designed by Jacques Cortelyou.

== Removal and restoration ==
In the winter of 2010, the monument's base and inscribed tablets were demolished. The bronze statue of Stuyvesant was hauled to a local stone yard.

Efforts to restore the statue began almost immediately. It was rededicated in a new park at Hudson County Community College in 2014.

== See also ==
- Old Bergen Church
- Speer Cemetery
- Van Wagenen House
- List of public art in Jersey City, New Jersey
