= Hilltop, Jersey City =

Populated place in Hudson County, New Jersey, US

Coordinates: 40.7287°N 74.0564°W

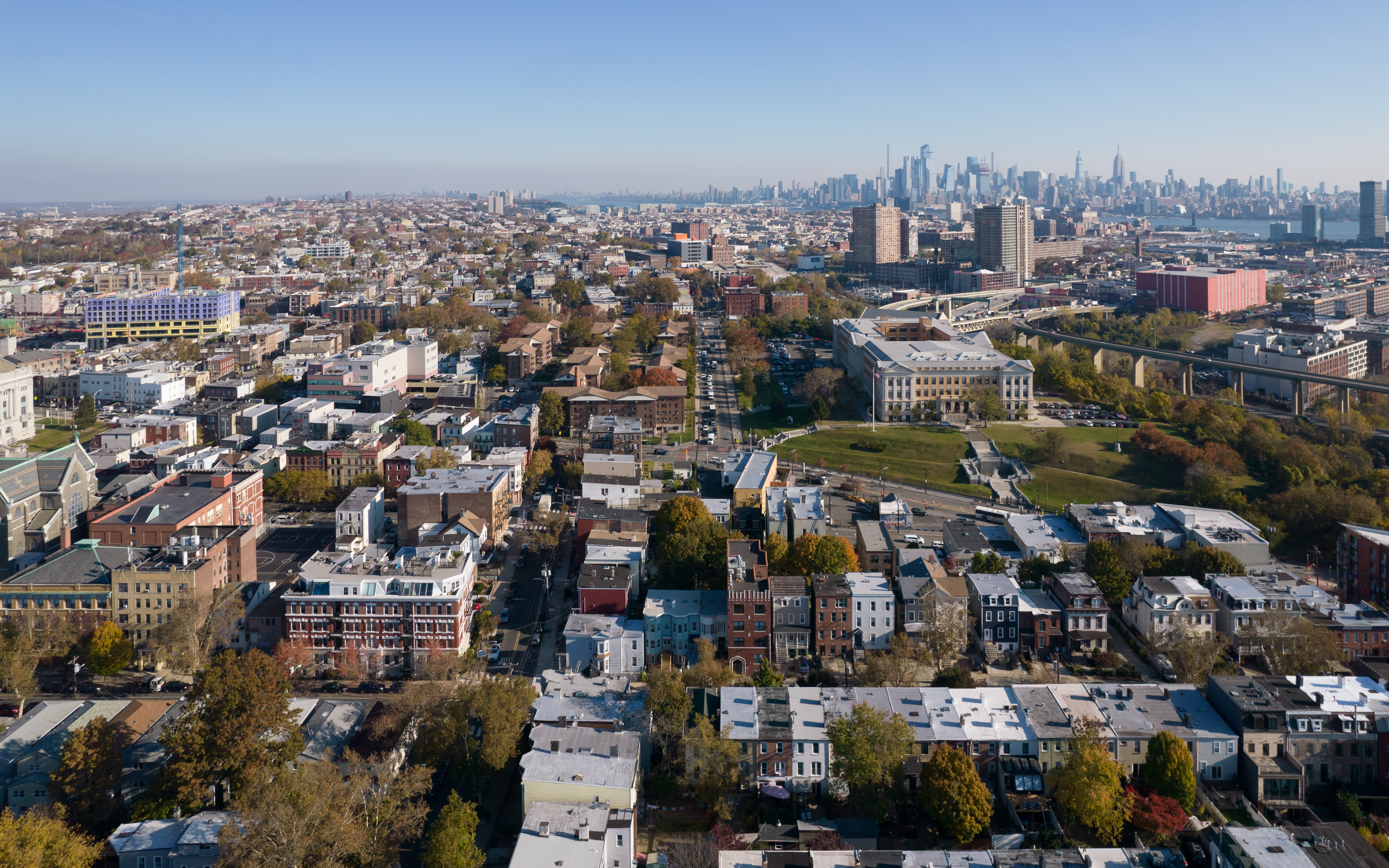
Aerial view of Hilltop, to the northeast

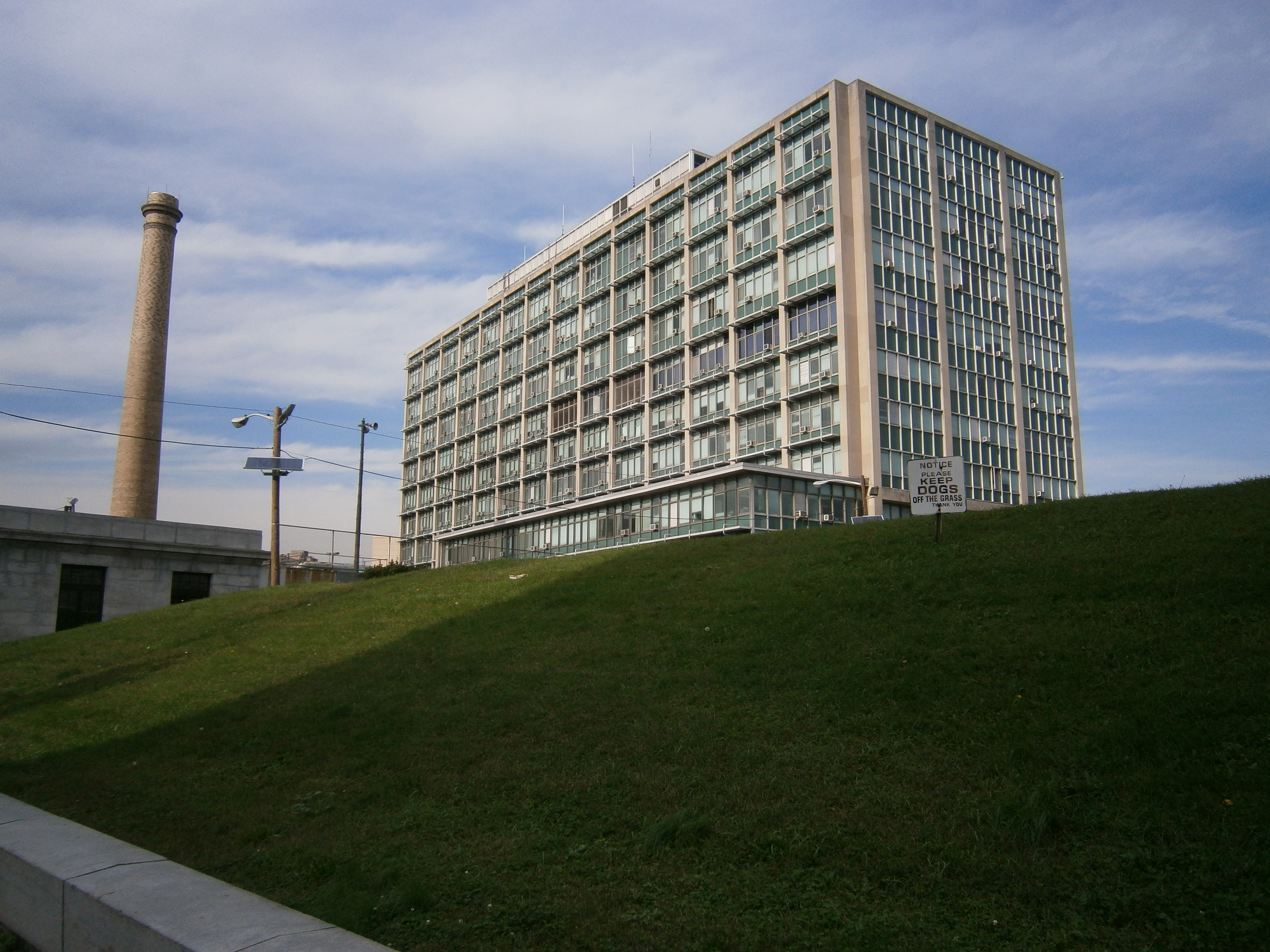
Hudson County Administration Building seen from Pavonia Avenue

Hilltop is the eastern section of the Journal Square district of Jersey City, New Jersey. The name is a reflection of its location atop Bergen Hill, the southern portion of the Hudson Palisades, on either side of the cut, or excavated ravine, through which the Port Authority Trans Hudson rapid transit system travels, offering some streets views of Downtown Jersey City, the New York Skyline, and the Upper New York Bay.

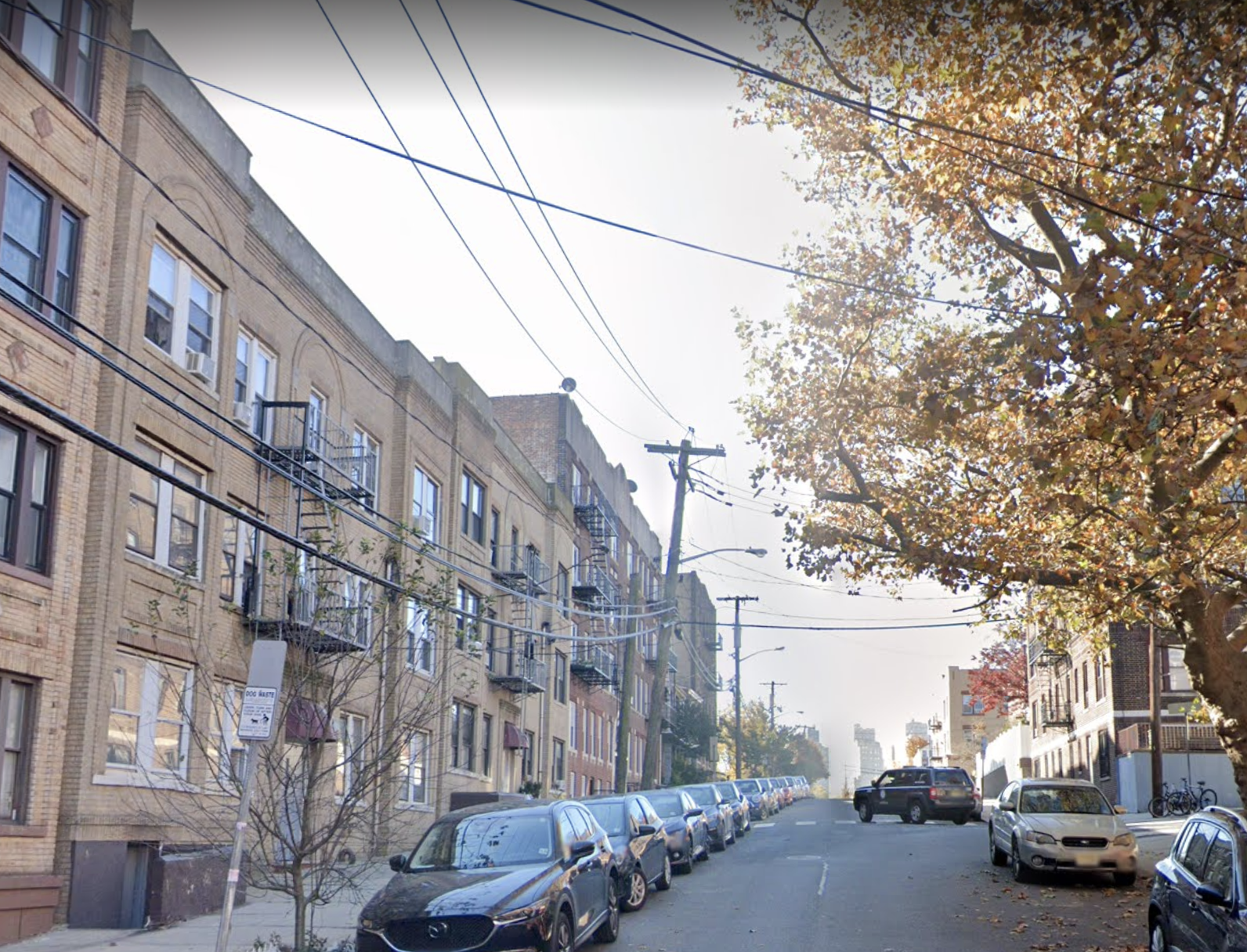
Waldo Ave looking south toward Magnolia Ave

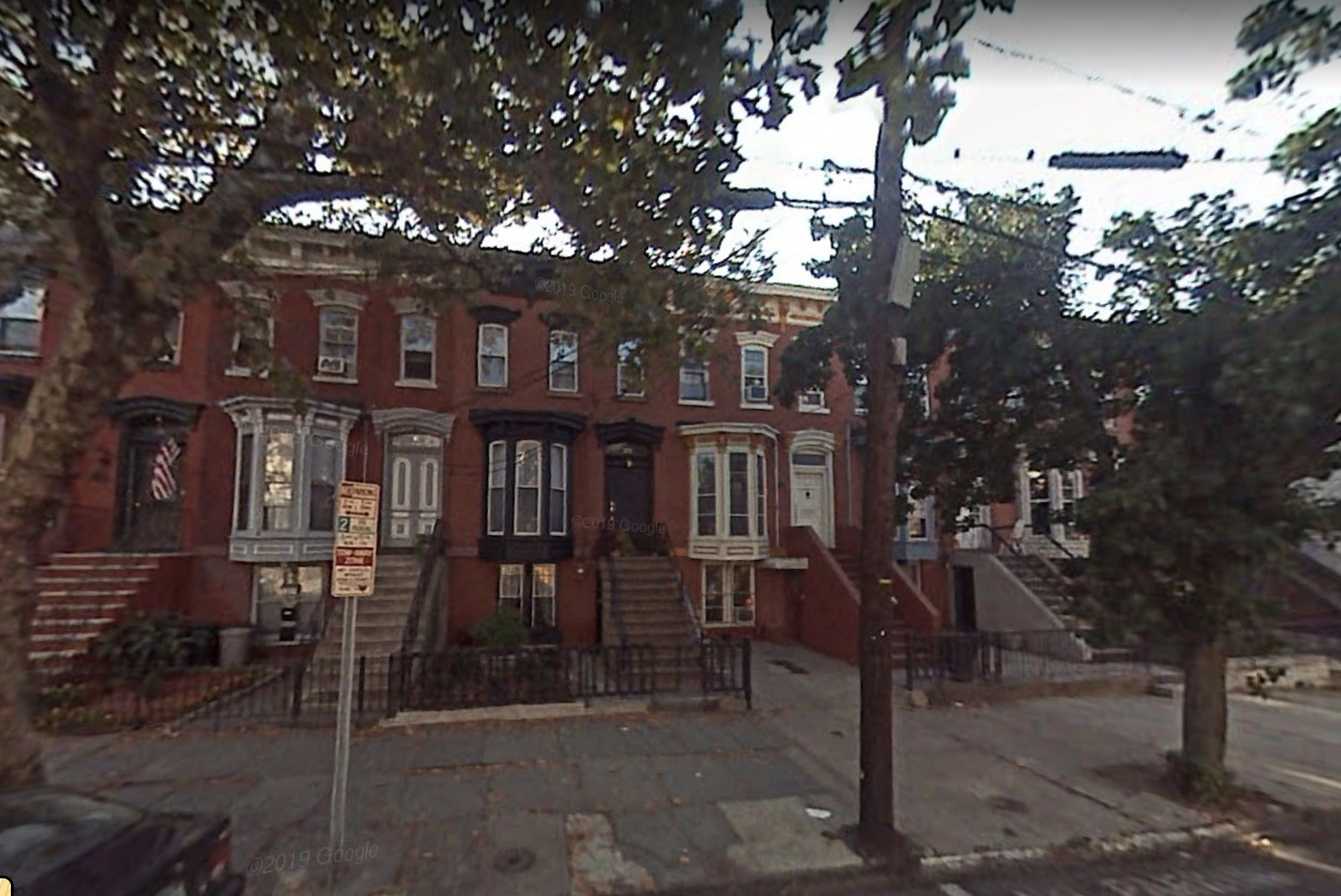
Magnolia Avenue between Chestnut Ave and Baldwin Ave

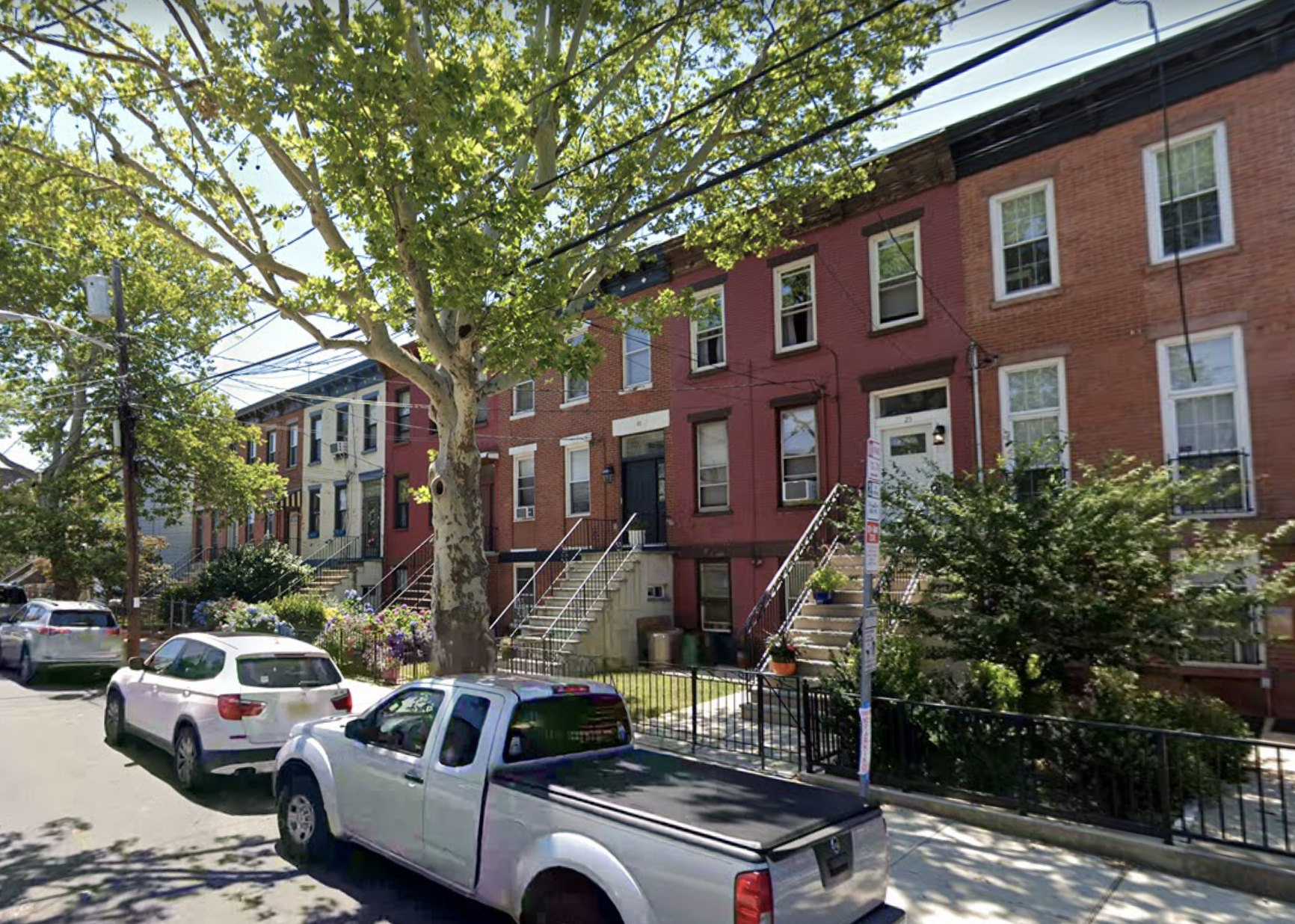
Henry Street between Waldo Ave and Chestnut Ave

The northern part of Hilltop is located to the east of Five Corners. The neighborhoods borders are created by other excavations, namely Bergen Arches, the Long Dock Tunnel, and The Depressed Highway. Soon after passing the Hudson County Courthouse, Newark Avenue begins its descent. Rising above the avenue at the beginning of Palisade Avenue is the historic landmark Jersey City High School. Designed by John T. Rowland (who also designed the Jersey City Medical Center and the Labor Bank Building), it was later renamed for William L. Dickinson, the Superintendent of Schools from 1872 until his death on November 3, 1883. Newark Avenue separates the school grounds from Jersey City and Harsimus Cemetery, originally developed in the mid 19th century. Across Palisade is the 1942 Hudson Gardens Housing Project. Behind the complex is Washburn Avenue, named for Richard Charles Washburn, a member of the New Jersey General Assembly. St Joseph's Church, built in 1873, is home to the old Catholic parish in the city.

The Island is a small enclave within the Hilltop neighborhood which takes its name from its location atop an isolated outcropping of Bergen Hill formerly called Mount Pleasant which has been diminished in size by the railroads tracks which surround it. Vehicular traffic can travel along Chestnut Avenue onto the island, which is also served by a footbridge at Waldo Avenue. The name Island was used as early as the 1960s and though unknown to many because of the small size.

South of the rail lines and east of Bergen Square, Summit Avenue and Baldwin Avenue continue along the ridge of the Palisades, passing by the Jersey City Armory. Mill Road connects the neighborhood with the former West End and is named for John Prior's Mill on Harsimus Creek. Mercer Street, one of the few that keeps its name as it rises from low-lying downtown is named for General Hugh Mercer, who stayed with John Prior at his home several times. The neighborhood overlooks the Waldo Yards, originally used by the Pennsylvania Railroad Jersey City Branch, and now partially used by Port Authority Trans Hudson maintenance facilities. In October 1948, the Freedom Train was stationed at the yards for two days during its trip across the United States.

A proposed development between the Journal Square Transportation Center, and neighbourhood called Journal Squared would include the city's tallest residential buildings. In 2012, the city approved a proposal to build a 42-storey residential tower adjacent to the Newkirk House, the oldest surviving structure in the city. Saint Demetrios Greek Orthodox Church is nearby.

There is additional pressure to increase housing density in the neighborhood.
