= Newkirk House =

17th century house in New Jersey, US

Coordinates: 40.7312°N 74.0603°W

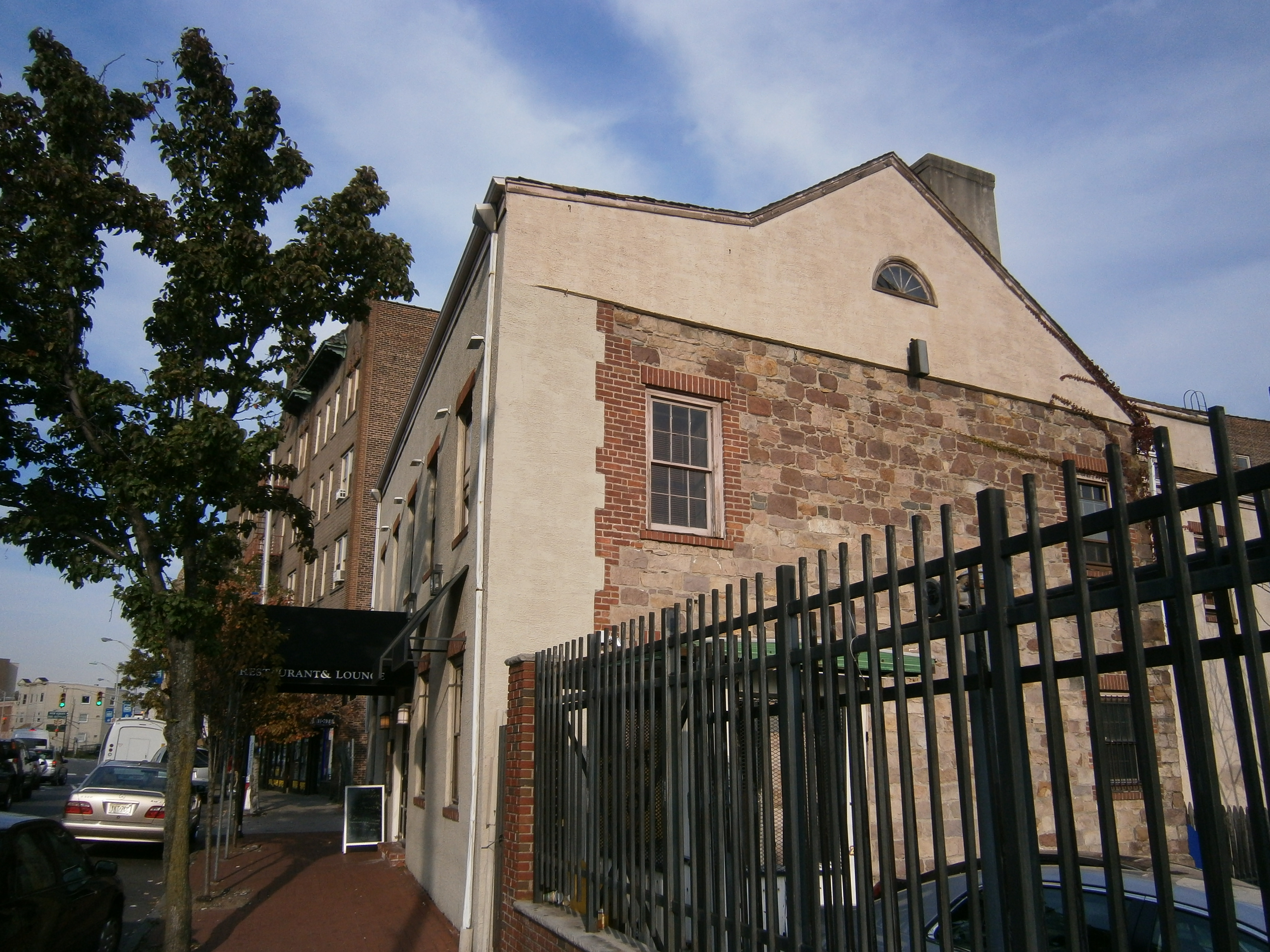
Newkirk House in 2012

The Newkirk House, also known as the Summit House, located at 510 Summit Avenue is the oldest surviving structure in Jersey City, New Jersey. The two-story Dutch Colonial building, composed of sandstone, brick, and clapboard dates to 1690.

Originally one story, the outer walls are two feet of stone fitted in lime and mortar. Beams of timber in the basement are six-by-twelve inches and those on the second floor are four-by-six inches spaced four-feet apart. Eight-inch wood pegs, rather than nails, were employed during the time of construction.

The building, currently empty, is the object of preservation efforts.

== Old Bergen ==
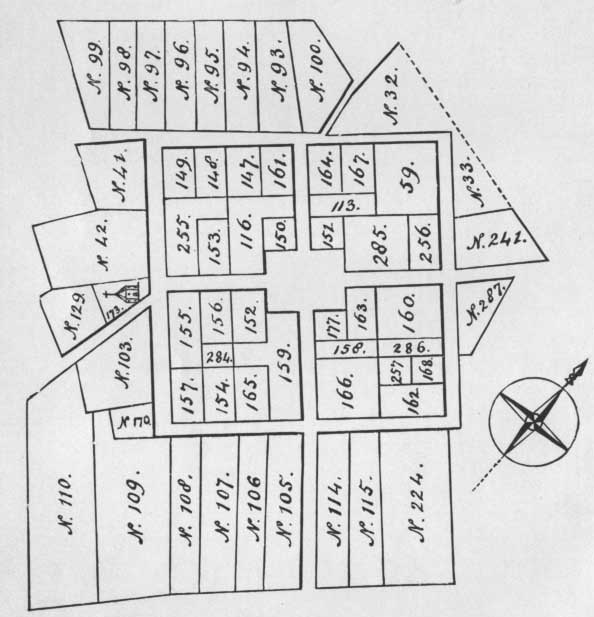
Newkirk acquired lots in the village, including #125, the site of Newkirk House northeast of the square (not shown), originally granted to John Berry and sold to Samuel Edsall. The northern perimeter of the square became Newkirk Street.

The part of New Netherland that would become Hudson County was first settled in the 1630s as Pavonia. In 1660, Director-General Petrus Stuyvesant granted a charter for development of a fortified village at what is now Bergen Square. Upon the British takeover of New Netherland it became Bergen Township, while the population remained rooted in native tradition and became known as the Bergen Dutch. Bergen, New Netherland became Bergen County, which in 1840 was divided, with its southern part becoming Hudson and long referred to as Old Bergen. The building is one of many in Northern New Jersey built by these early colonial settlers and their descendants.

Mattheus Cornelissen Newkirk and his brother Gerrit Newkirk arrived in New Amsterdam aboard De Moesman in 1659. Their surname, van Niewkercke, translates as "from new church" near their birthplace. Mattheus C. moved to Bergen in 1665. His family acquired lots in and near the village and built another homestead nearby.

During the American Revolution Bergen was nominally under the control of the British, although the Americans frequently made forays in the area for reconnaissance and foraging. The Newkirk House was located near Five Corners, and important crossroads where Summit Avenue ran north into the Bergen Woods. After the Battle of Paulus Hook, the Americans originally planned to retreat via ferry over the Hackensack River, but were forced to return to wait at Sip and Summit Avenues. The house was later identified on British military maps drawn in 1781 for General Henry Clinton.

== Journal Square ==
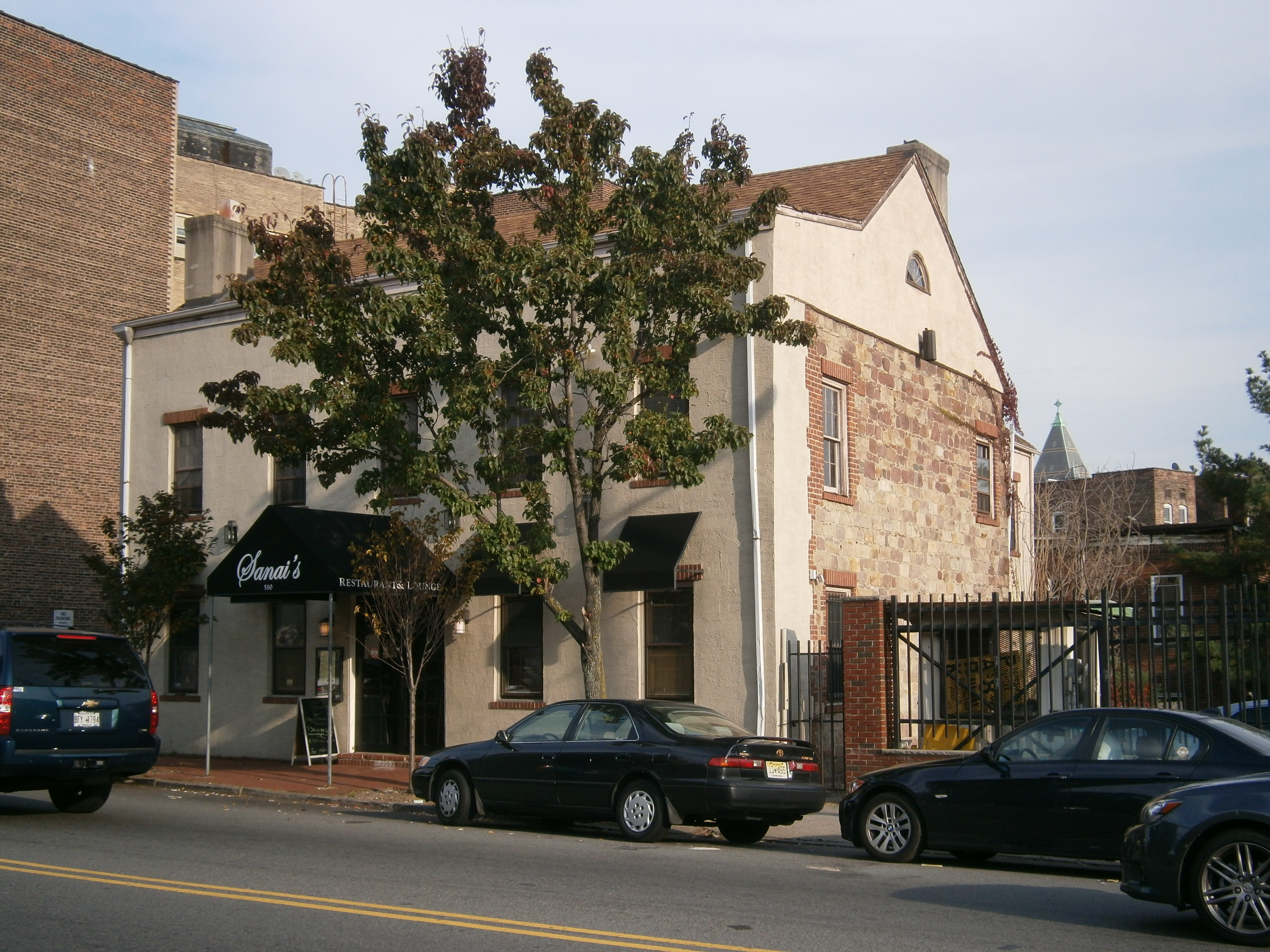
Summit Avenue was re-aligned in 1928.

The homestead remained in the Newkirk family until 1899, after which it was used by the Queen's Daughters Day Nursery Association and then by a succession of retail businesses. With the opening of the Hudson and Manhattan Railroad Summit Avenue station in 1912, the area around Bergen Square was redeveloped, and many of the homesteads were razed to make way for new buildings. Among them are the headquarters of the newspaper Jersey Journal, after which Journal Square is named, and the Labor Bank Building, considered the city's first skyscraper. Another family property, the Newkirk Homestead was demolished, though a street still bears the name of the early settlers. The Sip Manor, built in 1666 and the oldest private home in New Jersey, was moved to Westfield. In 1928, Summit Avenue was re-routed, affecting the property line of the tract; the front of the Newkirk House was altered and new windows were placed along its side.

== Restaurant and neighborhood redevelopment plans ==
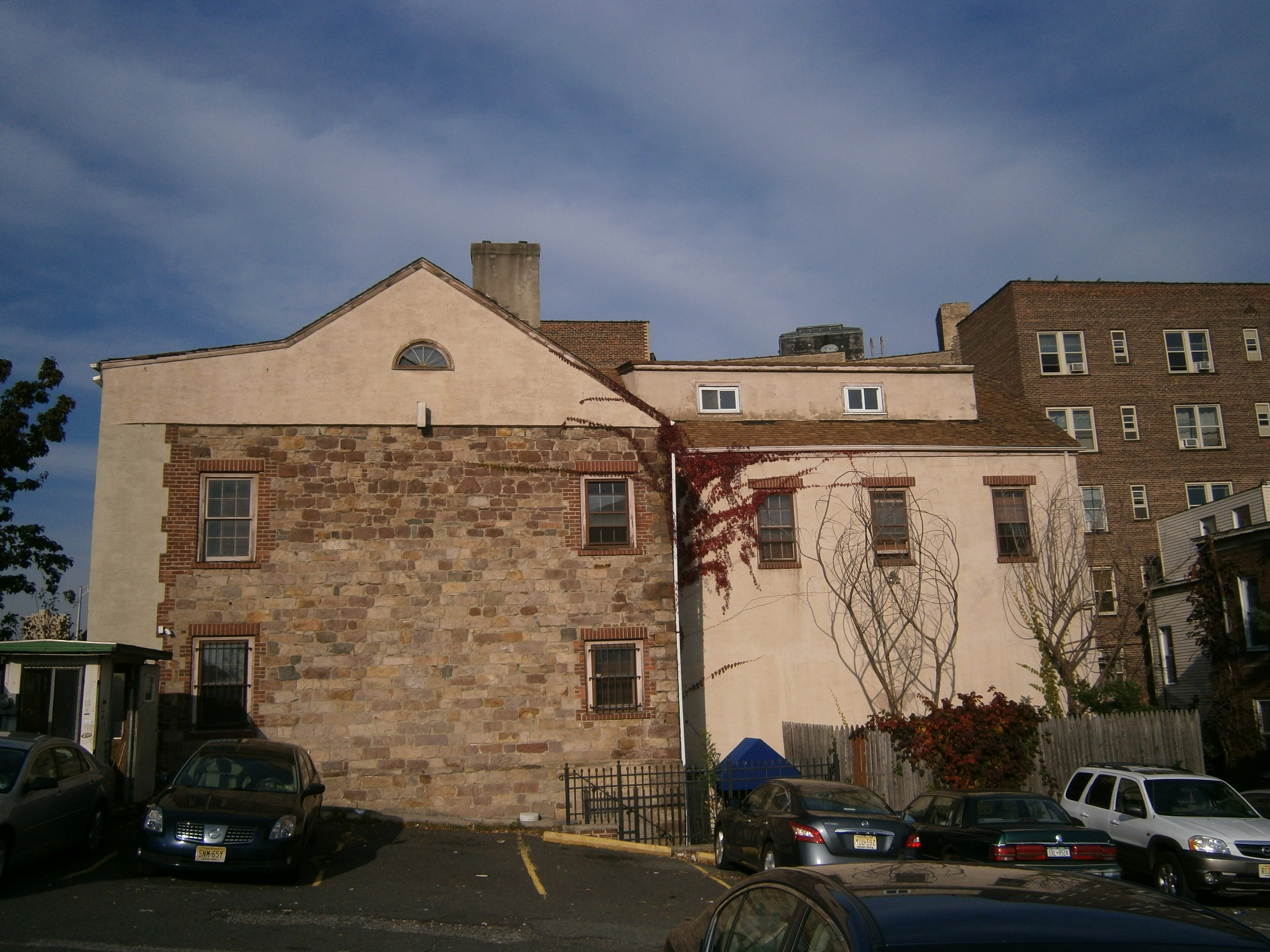
A 42-story tower is planned for the site adjacent to Newkirk House..

In 1979, Newkirk House was listed on the New Jersey Register of Historic Places (ID#1519). and became a restaurant known as the Summit House. During renovations it was determined that it had originally been a one-story structure. It later became Sanai's, owned by native son, NBA star, and political activist Terry Dehere. The building is situated between the Journal Square Transportation Center and neighborhood known as The Hilltop. In 2012, the city adopted a variance for a development proposal to build a 42-story residential tower and adjacent garage on its south and east sides.

The building was bought by a land preservation organization for $1.2 million, but remains empty since the restaurant's closing.

== See also ==
- Bergen, New Netherland
- Old Bergen Church
- Van Wagenen House
- Van Vorst House
- List of the oldest buildings in New Jersey
- Three Pigeons
- National Register of Historic Places listings in Bergen County, New Jersey, including numerous Bergen Dutch homes
- National Register of Historic Places listings in Hudson County, New Jersey
