= West End, New Jersey =

West End, New Jersey may refer to:

- West End, Trenton, New Jersey
- West End, Monmouth County, New Jersey
- West End, Jersey City
- West End Junction (Jersey City)
