= Speer Cemetery =

Cemetery in Jersey City, New Jersey, US

Old Bergen's Speer Cemetery, DeMott Family Burial Ground
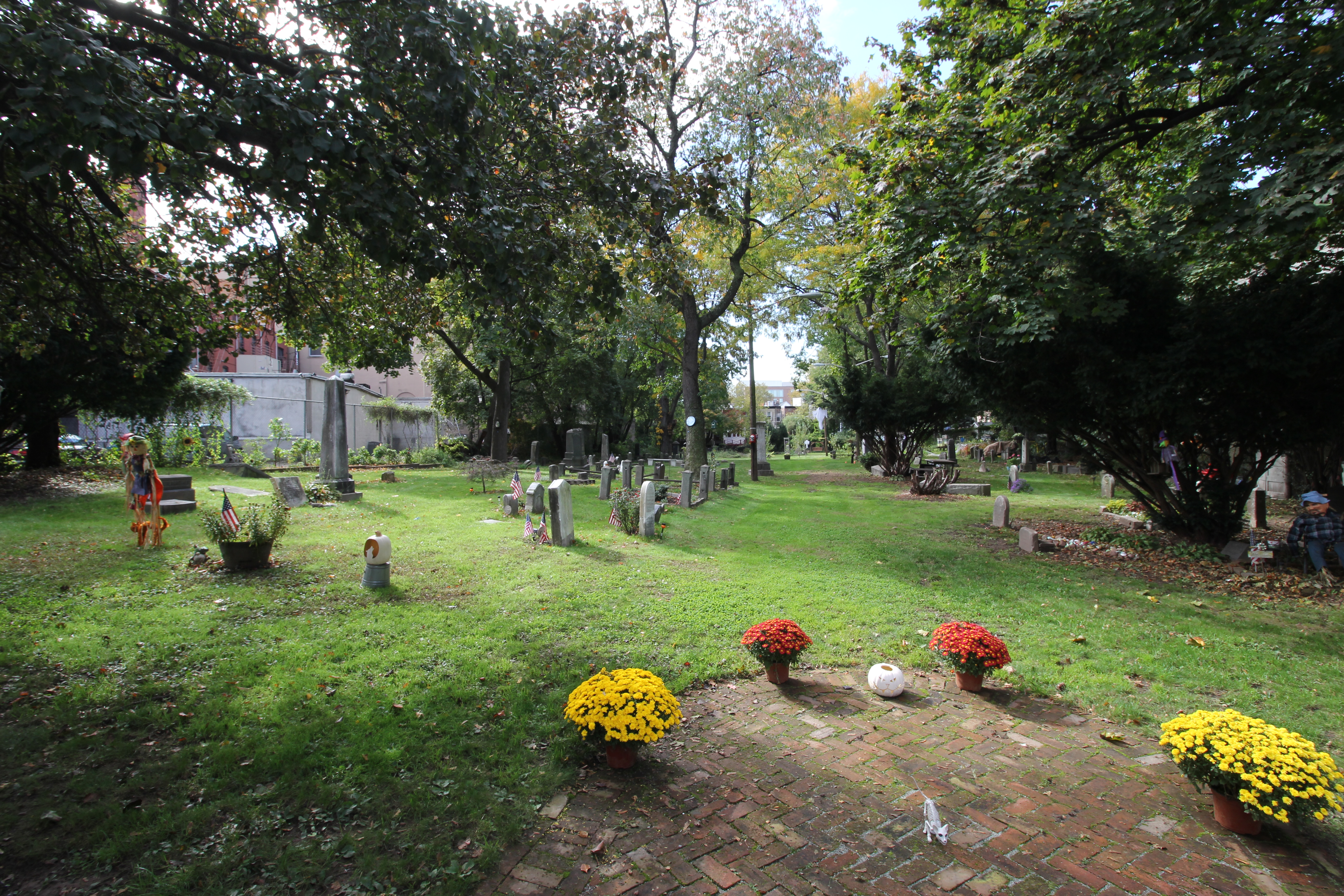
- Interactive map of Old Bergen's Speer Cemetery, DeMott Family Burial Ground

Details
- Established: 1852
- Location: Jersey City, New Jersey
- Country: United States
- Coordinates: 40.7284°N 74.0678°W
- Website: https://www.friendsofspeer.org/
- Find a Grave: Old Bergen's Speer Cemetery, DeMott Family Burial Ground

Old Bergen's Speer Cemetery is located at 145 Vroom St in the Bergen Square neighborhood of Jersey City, New Jersey, between Bergen Ave. and Van Reypen St.

Speer Cemetery is frequently confused with the present day Bergen Cemetery owned and operated by Old Bergen Church, a portion of which also fronts on Vroom St but is further east, at Tuers Ave. The two cemeteries always operated independently of each other.

The land Speer Cemetery sits on was originally part of apple orchards owned by the Van Waganen family of Apple Tree House fame. After title to the property was transferred from the Van Waganens to Matthias DeMott, it became the Bergen DeMott's family burial ground. It is the oldest and only known family burial ground in existence in Jersey City. The Bergen DeMotts were early settlers to New Netherland first in Esopus (present day Kingston, NY) and later, Long Island, NY before later generations, including Mathias, settled in Bergen, New Netherland (present day Old Bergen, Jersey City) in the 1770s.

Old Bergen's Speer Cemetery is colloquially named for Jane Speer and her husband, Abraham Speer, the local undertaker and former sexton of Old Bergen Church during the mid-1800's. They bought the land from the De Mott estate in 1857 and made it a public cemetery, selling burial plots for $16 each. Despite Mr. Speers' affiliation with Old Bergen Church, one did not have to be affiliated with any church or religion to be buried in Speer Cemetery.

Speer Cemetery was abandoned in the early 1900s and the Speer family records have never been published. The cemetery has been maintained by volunteers for over ninety years. The volunteers' motto is, "Caring For The Forgotten".

Cataloging of names from headstones and historical records, including individual deeds and burial records collected by neighbors, volunteers and the Bergen Square Historical Society, make it possible to now verify many who are buried in the cemetery. Additionally, underground sonar was conducted to locate unmarked graves. Contact the Bergen Square Historical Society via their Facebook page for more information.

In addition to hundreds of non-denominational interments, Speer Cemetery is the final resting place for dozens of patients of Snake Hill (Laurel Hill) Sanitarium. They were interred in one of the cemetery's two catacombs during the late nineteenth and early twentieth centuries. It's rumored that DeMott family members are interred in the second catacomb, though many DeMott headstones are above ground.

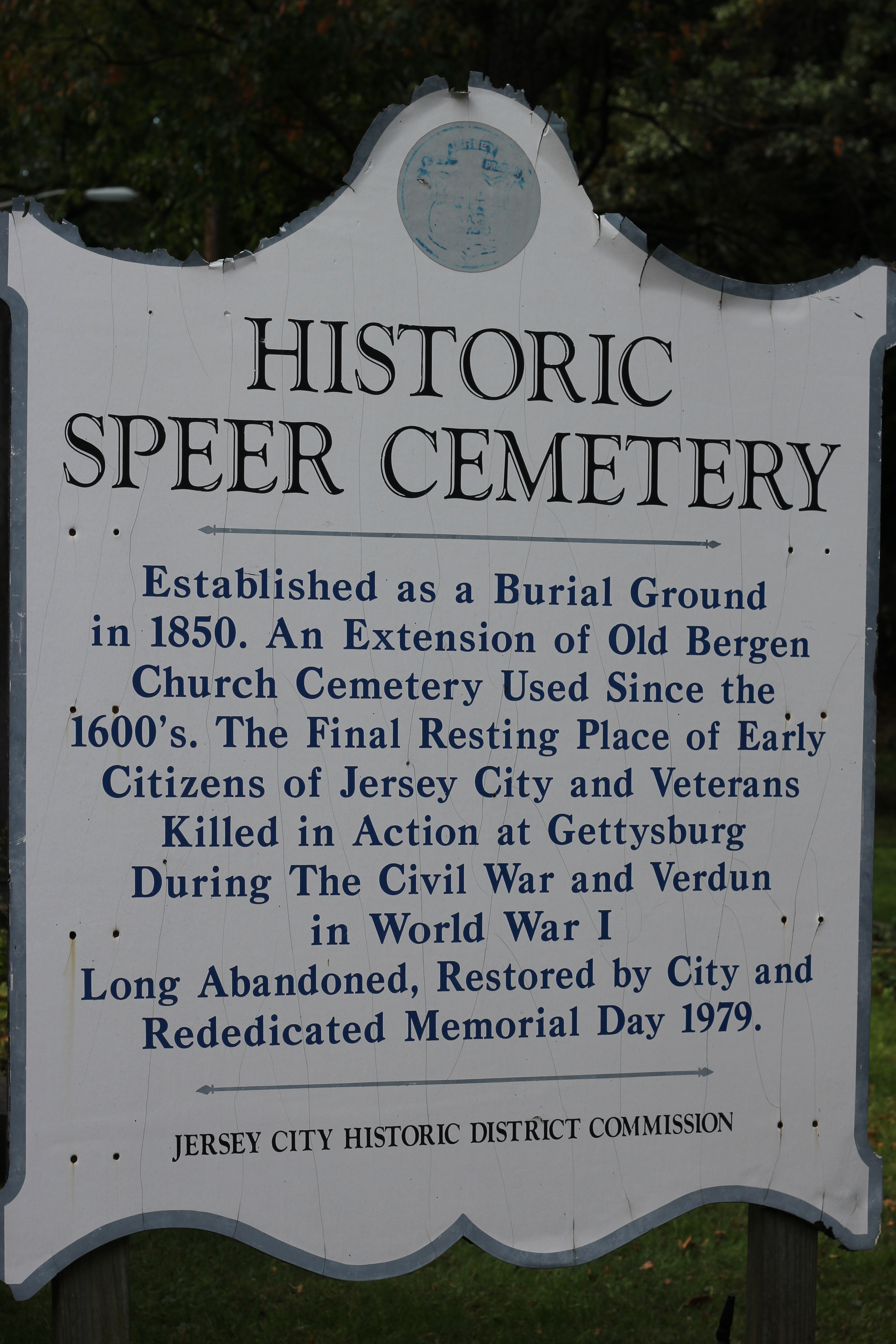

The earliest surviving gravemarker in the cemetery is dated 1756.

Headstones indicate the burial of the veterans of the American Revolutionary War, War of 1812, American Civil War, and the Spanish–American War. Its last interments occurred during World War I.

Plans to construct a building on a lot adjacent to the remaining cemetery grounds have been met with opposition, since it is believed that the land being developed was once part of the burial ground and contains human remains, possibly dating back to the 1660s; the developer has been ordered to hire an archeologist to validate that belief.

== See also ==
- Hudson County Cemeteries
- Van Wagenen House
