= Journal Square =

Neighborhood in Jersey City, New Jersey, US

- Neighborhood and business district
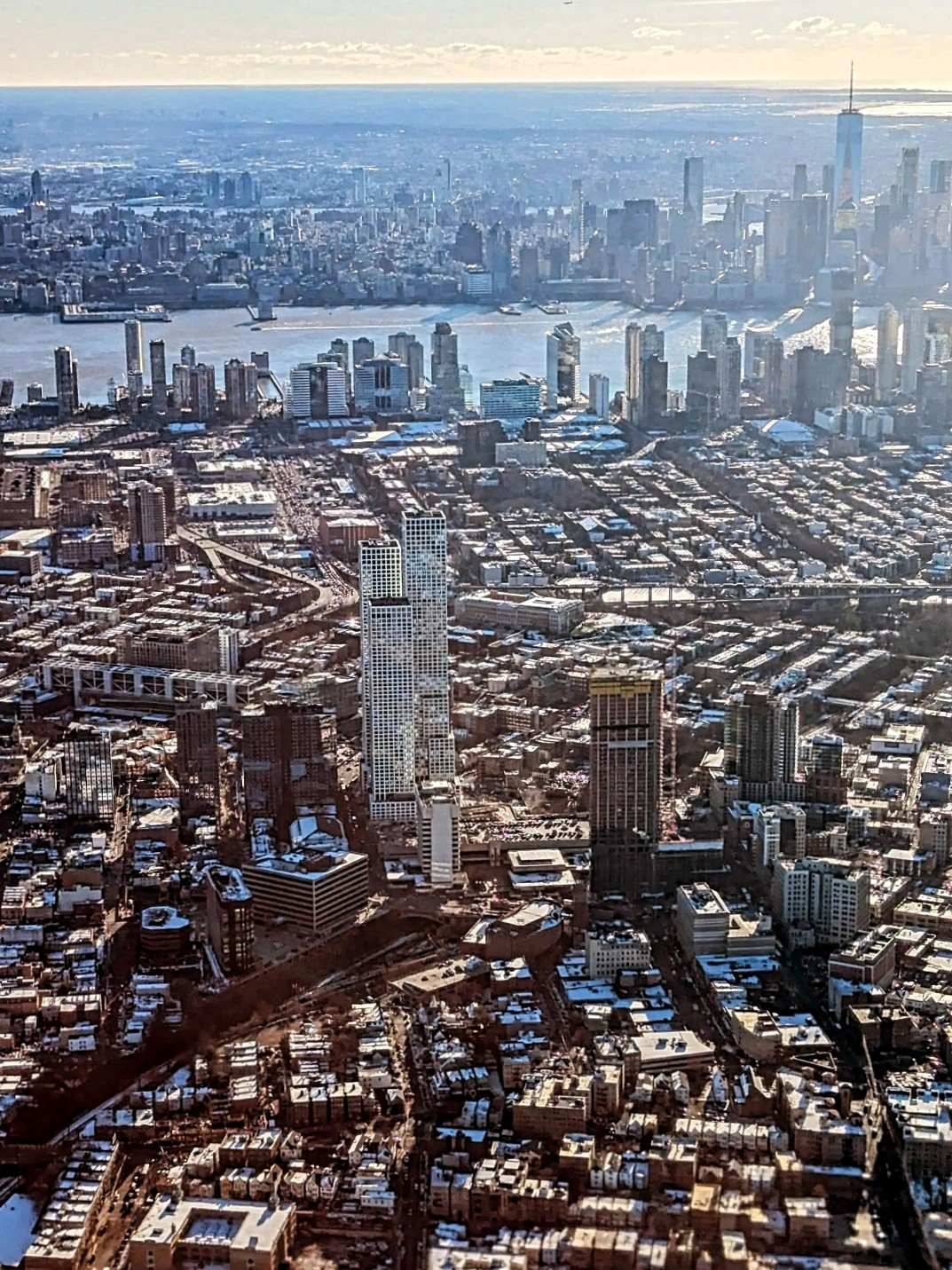
- An aerial view of Journal Square.
- Interactive map of Journal Square
- Coordinates: 40°43′56″N 74°03′43″W
- Country: United States
- State: New Jersey
- City: Jersey City

Area
  - Total: 1.174 sq mi (3.04 km^{2})

Population (2010)
  - Total: 32,573
  - Density: 27,750/sq mi (10,710/km^{2})

Ethnicity
  - White: 18.5%
  - Asian: 41.8%
  - Hispanic: 22.7%
  - Black: 8.5%
  - Others: 4.2%
  - Two or more: 3.1%
  - Native American: 1.3%

Economics
  - Median income: $76,335
- Time zone: UTC−05:00 (Eastern)
  - Summer (DST): UTC−04:00 (EDT)
- ZIP Codes: 07306
- Area code: 201, 551

Journal Square is a business district, residential area, and transportation hub in Jersey City, New Jersey. It is named for the newspaper Jersey Journal, whose headquarters were located there from 1911 to 2013. The "square" itself is at the intersection of Kennedy Boulevard and Bergen Avenue. The broader area extends to and includes Bergen Square, McGinley Square, India Square, the Five Corners and parts of the Marion Section. Many local, state, and federal agencies serving Hudson County maintain offices in the district.

== History ==
The Square was named for the Jersey Journal.

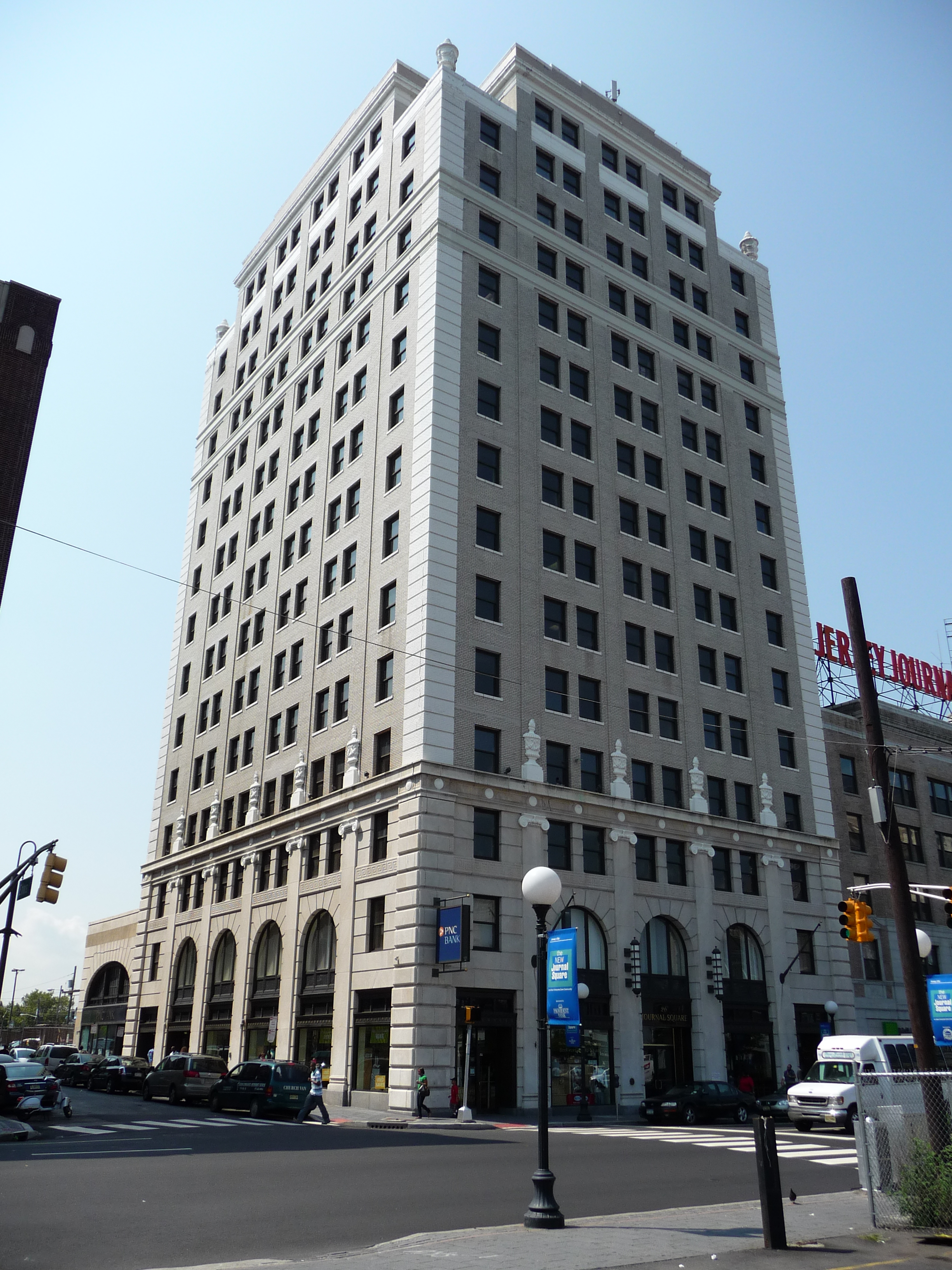
The Labor Bank Building at 26 Journal Square was the city's first skyscraper.

Prior to its development as a commercial district Journal Square was the site of many farmhouses and manors belonging to descendants of the original settlers of Bergen, the first chartered municipality in the state settled in 1660 and located just south at Bergen Square. In conjunction with the 1912 opening of the Hudson and Manhattan Railroad Summit Avenue station many of those properties were demolished to make way for modern buildings, including the still standing Labor Bank Building and the Public Service building. The Newkirk House and Van Wagenen House remain, while the still-intact Sip Manor was moved to Westfield, New Jersey. The square was created in 1923 when the city condemned and demolished the offices of the Jersey Journal, thus creating a broad intersection with Hudson Boulevard which itself had been widened in 1908. The newspaper built new headquarters and the new square was named in its honor.

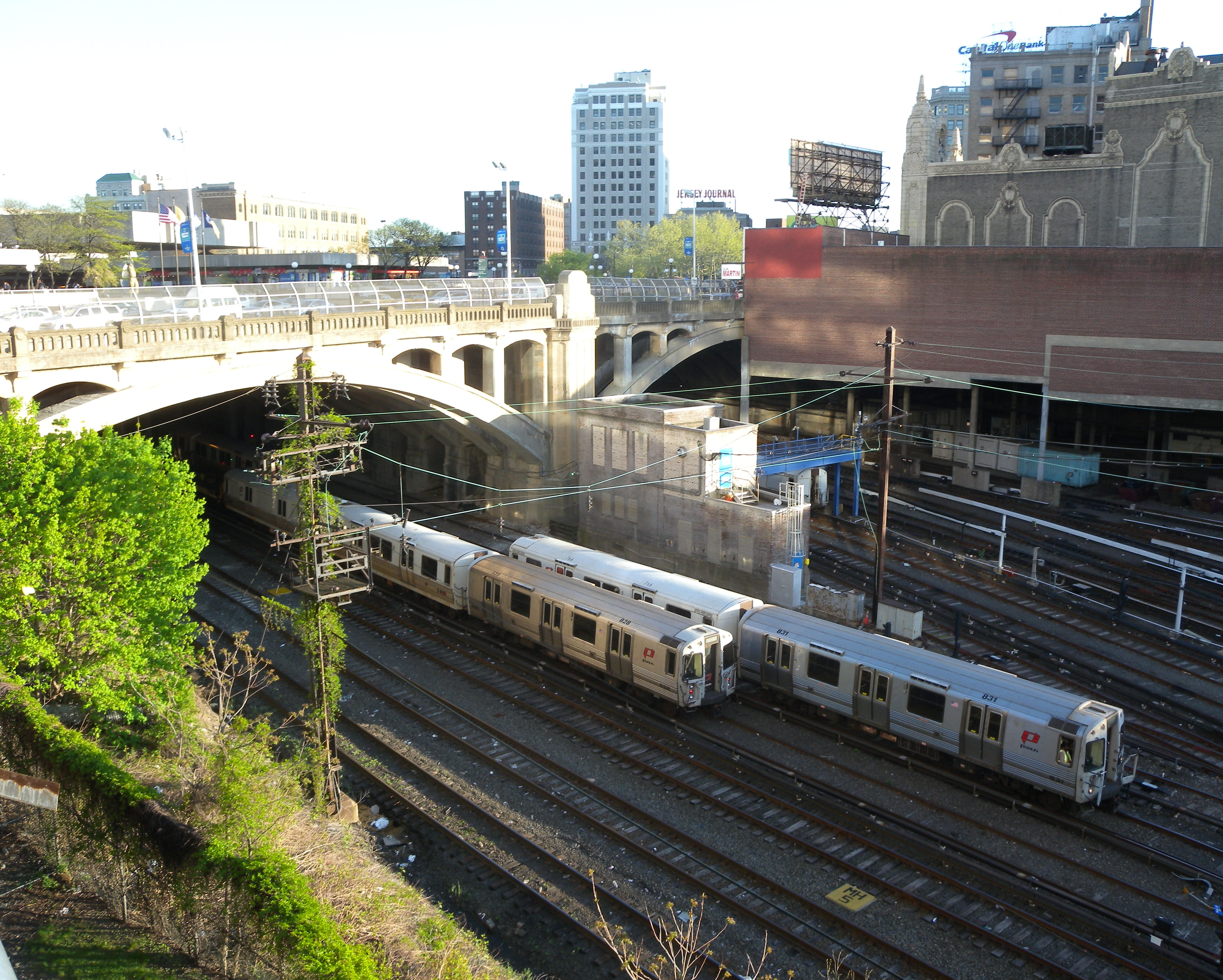
Hudson County Boulevard Bridge

The bridge carrying the boulevard was designed by consulting engineer Abraham Burton Cohen and completed in 1926. For most of the twentieth century Journal Square was the cultural entertainment center of Hudson County, home to the movie palaces built in the 1920s: The State (1922, and since demolished), the Stanley Theater (1928), and the Loew's Jersey Theater (1929). Karen Angel of The New York Daily News described Journal Square from the 1920s to the 1960s as a "crown jewel, a glowing commercial, entertainment and transportation hub of the city." The "Jersey Bounce", a hit song in the 1940s mentions Journal Square in its lyrics as the place where it got started. Two days before Election Day in 1960 John F. Kennedy made his last campaign speech at Journal Square, before returning to New England. Hudson Boulevard was named Kennedy Boulevard soon after his assassination. The Tube Bar, so-called for the Hudson Tubes (as the fore-runner of the PATH system was called) was made famous by Louis "Red" Deutsch getting prank calls there.

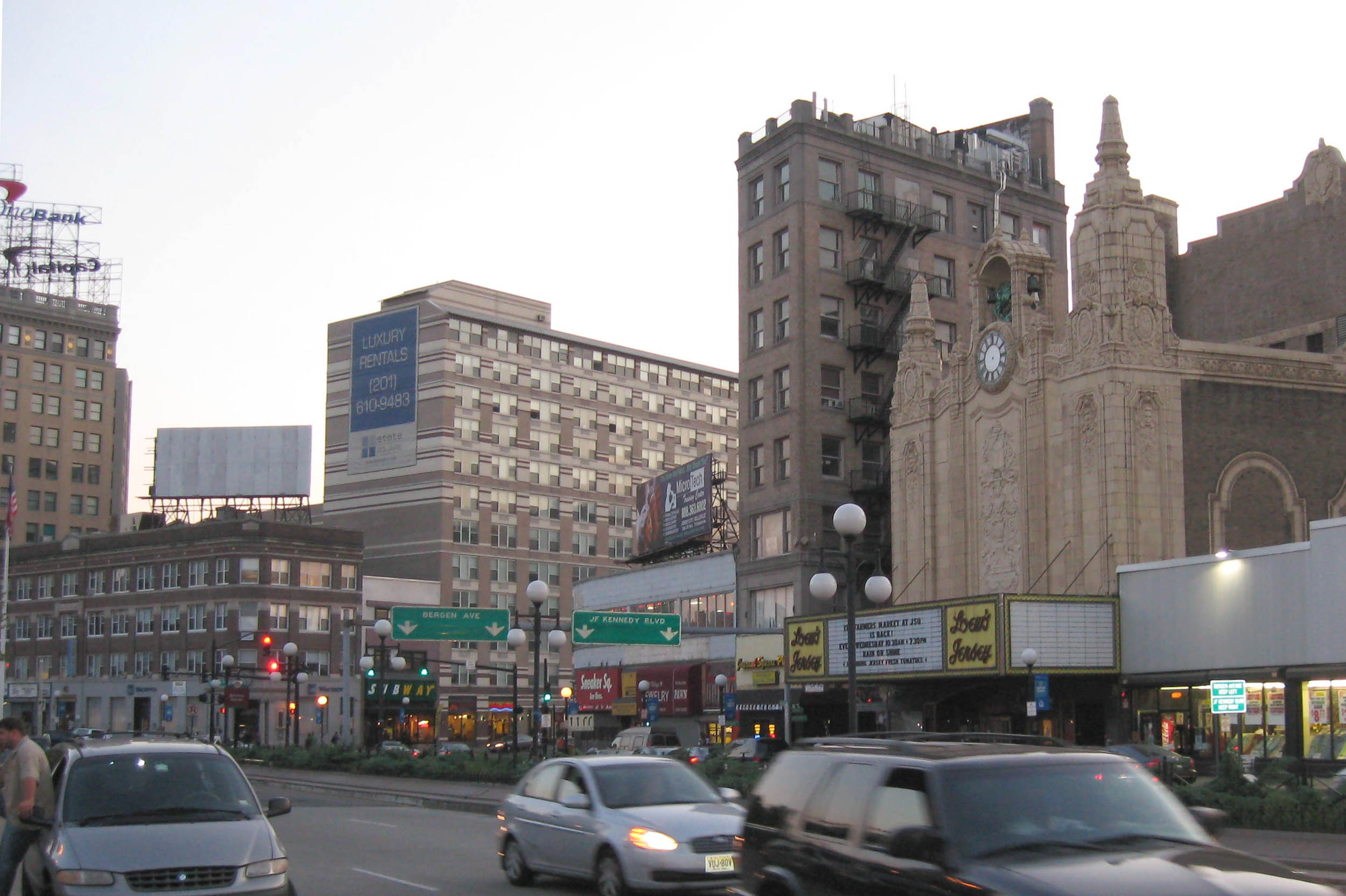
Journal Square at dusk

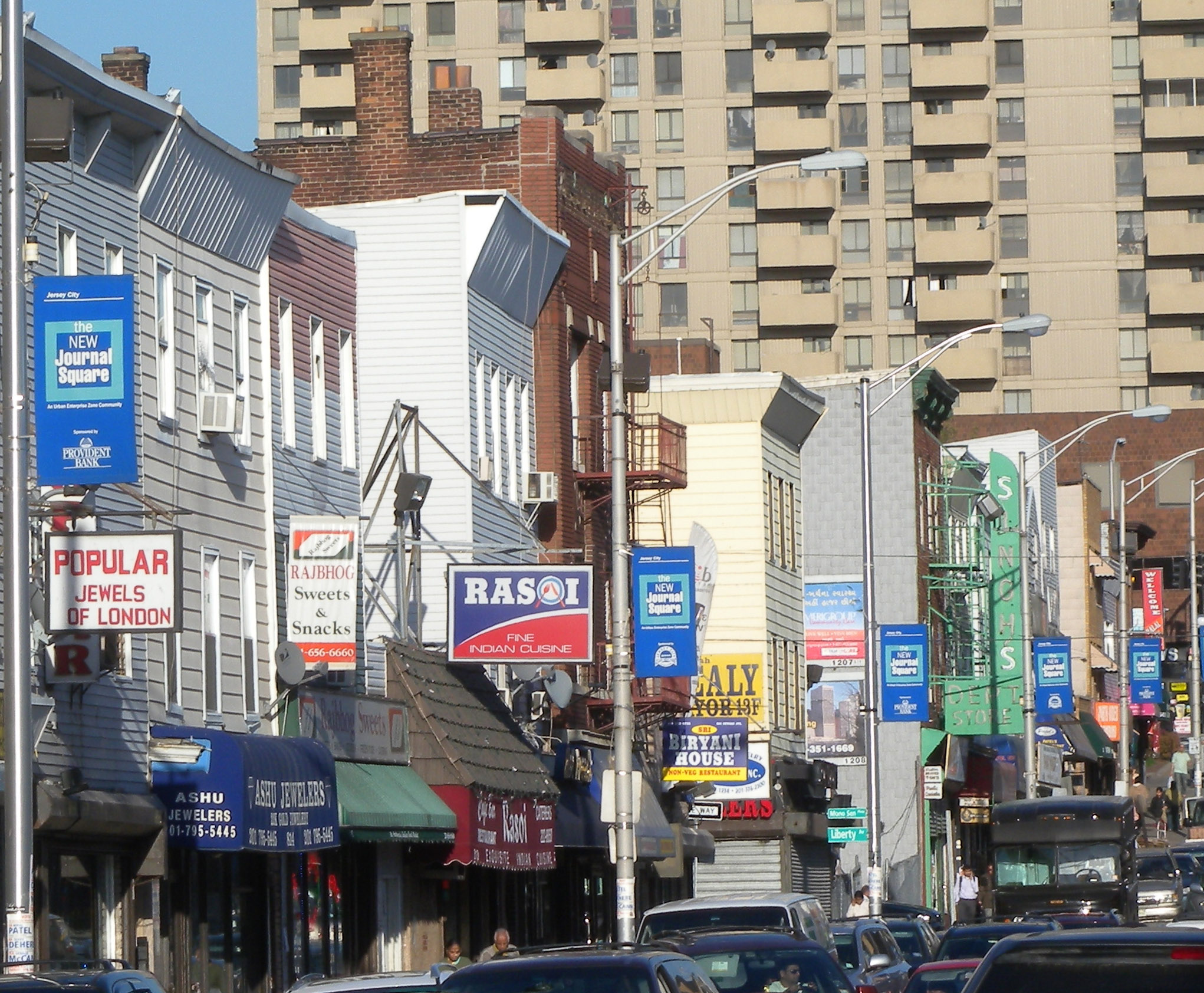
India Square on Newark Avenue

The Journal Square Transportation Center, opened between 1973 and 1975, includes the Journal Square PATH and bus station, and is the headquarters of PATH. It is built on an elevated bridge structure above the Bergen Hill Cut, an 1834 railroad cut once used by Pennsylvania Railroad main line and Jersey City Branch and now by the PATH rapid transit system and an occasional freight train. In front of the station is a statue of Jackie Robinson who in 1946 crossed the baseball color line at Roosevelt Stadium.

A statue of Christopher Columbus, the work of Jersey City native Archimedes Giacomontonio, has been located on the square since 1950. The Stanley and the Loew's have both been restored, the first now an Assembly Hall of Jehovah's Witnesses, the latter used as a moviehouse and for other cultural events.

The campus of Hudson County Community College is a collection of buildings throughout the district around the square. A few blocks to the south near McGinley Square, are Saint Peter's University, Hudson Catholic Regional High School, and the Jersey City Armory. A concentration of Overseas Filipino and Indian American–operated shops can be found along Newark Avenue and near India Square to the north.

Northeast of Journal Square is Five Corners, the county seat of Hudson County. The Hudson County Courthouse, located at 583 Newark Avenue 40°43′55″N 74°3′25″W, and the adjacent Hudson County Administration Building, at 595 Newark Avenue, are home to the county's courts and a number of county agencies and departments. The Five Corners Branch of the Jersey City Public Library is sited on the intersection itself, while William L. Dickinson High School is located nearby at 2 Palisade Avenue.

== High-rise development ==
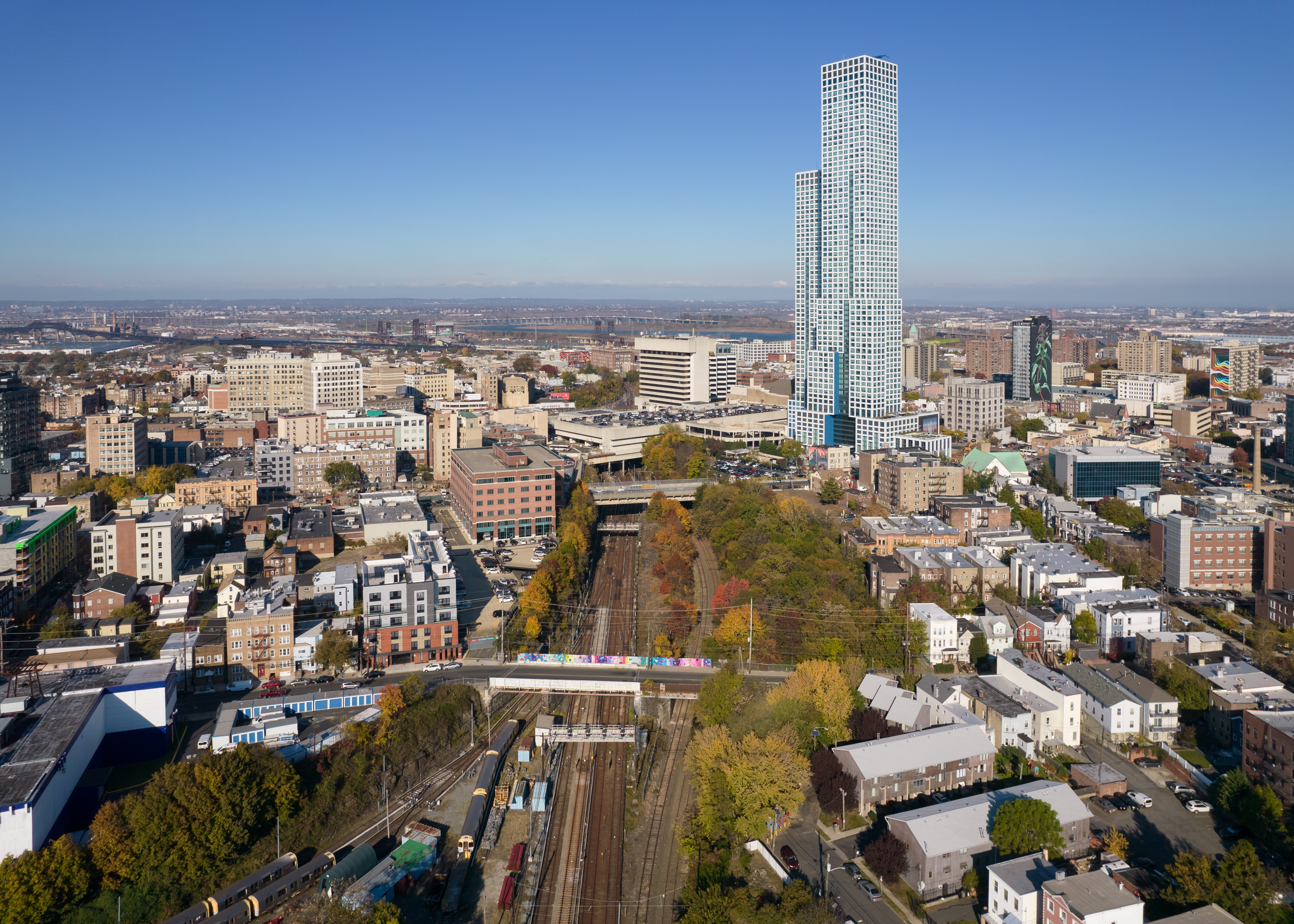
Aerial view looking northwest to Journal Square

Many of the buildings in Journal Square include housing stock (such as brownstones, pre-war apartment buildings, and Frame houses), convenience stores, bodegas, and downscale franchises, that Jerremiah Healy, Mayor of Jersey City, has referred to as "ugly old eyesores." The redevelopment of Journal Square has attracted the interest of urban planners, architects, sociologists, and others, many who view its historical, current, and future use as an important indicator of the contemporary understanding of how cities function.

In 2008, proposals were announced for complex called 1 Journal Square which would combine rental housing, multi-story retail, and parking. Plans for the mixed-use development called for 68-story and 50-story residential towers above a 7-story retail and parking base with a rooftop terrace. While the site was cleared, deadlines to begin construction by 2011 were not met by the developer, Multi-Employer Property Trust. The site later became The Journal, a pair of 64-story towers which was completed in 2026.

A proposed development by Kushner Real Estate Group and National Real Estate Advisors, Journal Squared, was announced as a 2.3 million square foot, 3-tower residential complex. The first phase, a 53-story tower, opened in early 2017. The final phase was completed in 2025. It sits directly adjacent to the Journal Square PATH station as a continuation of the dense transit-oriented development that has arisen further to the east in Jersey City. The towers were designed by Hollwich Kushner and Handel Architects.

In October 2011, MEPT purchased Newport Tower on the Hudson waterfront for $377 million, a record price for an office real estate transaction in the state. A further extension to 2013 requested by MEPTA was not granted by the Jersey City Redevelopment Agency.

Jersey City is one of nine municipalities in New Jersey designated as eligible for Urban Transit Hub Tax Credits by the state's Economic Development Authority. Developers who invest a minimum of $50 million within 0.5 miles (0.80 km) of a train station are eligible for pro-rated tax credit.

In 2012, the city adopted a variance for a development proposal to build a 42-story residential tower and adjacent garage on the south and east sides of the Newkirk House. A 13-story residential building is proposed for a parking platform adjacent to and overlooking the PATH tracks originally developed in 1984.

In December 2012 the Jersey Journal sold its building and relocated to Harmon Plaza in nearby Secaucus; however, a large sign with the paper's name was still in place atop the building in the square as of June 2015.

In 2024, the Jersey City Council adopted a zoning ordinance for Journal Square, requiring that new residential projects with over 30 apartments set aside either 10% or 15% as affordable housing, based on that census tract's income. In the 2020s, other mixed-use projects were completed or planned throughout the district. 2859-2873 John F. Kennedy Boulevard, a 55-story tower near the Loew's Jersey Theatre, was approved in April 2026, and 547-555 Summit Avenue, a 47-story twin-tower development, was approved that September.

== See also ==
- National Register of Historic Places listings in Hudson County, New Jersey
- New Jersey Transit Bus Operations
- List of neighborhoods in Jersey City, New Jersey
