= Five Corners, Jersey City =

Populated place in Hudson County, New Jersey, US

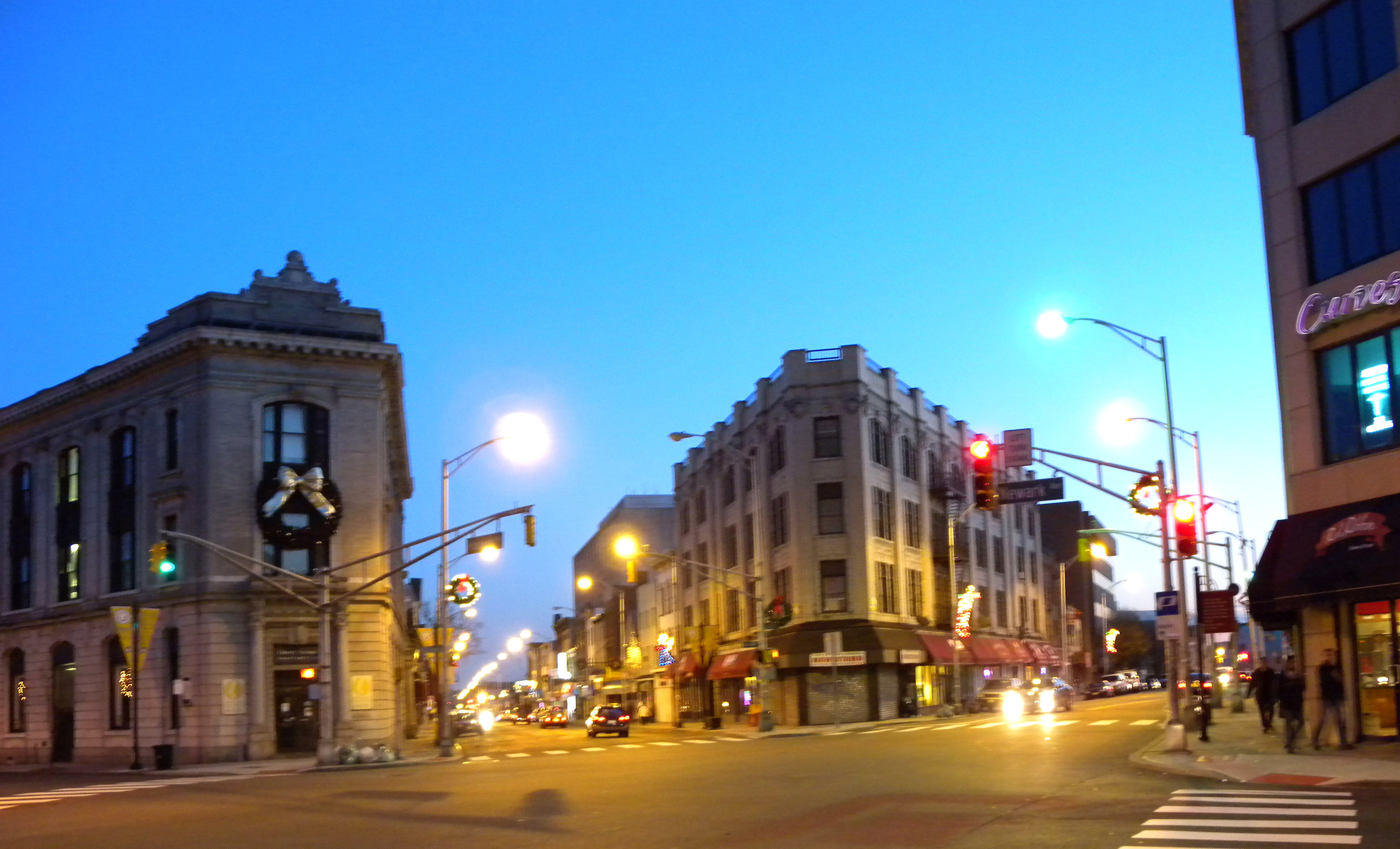
Newark Avenue on left; Summit Avenue on right

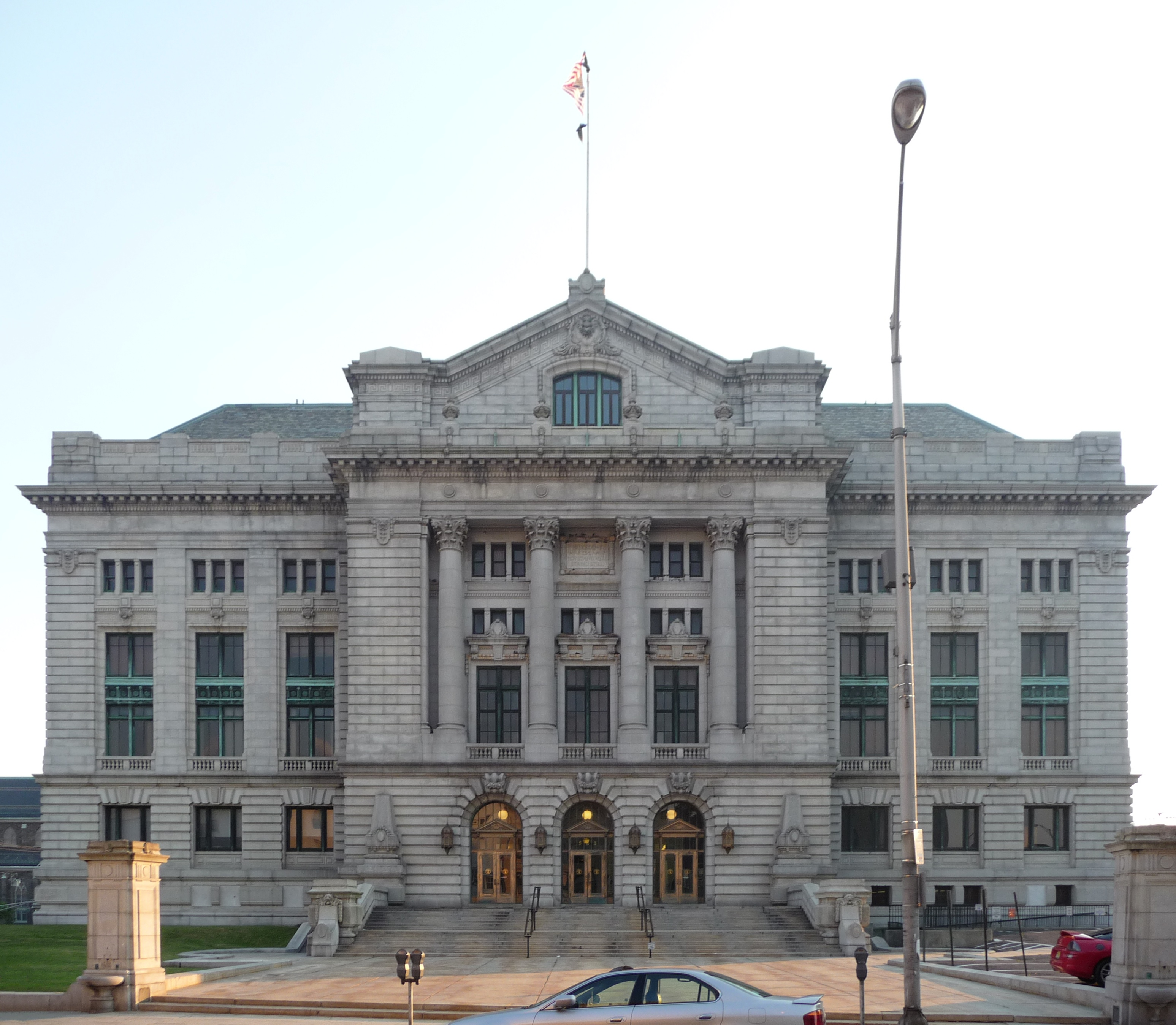
Hudson County Courthouse

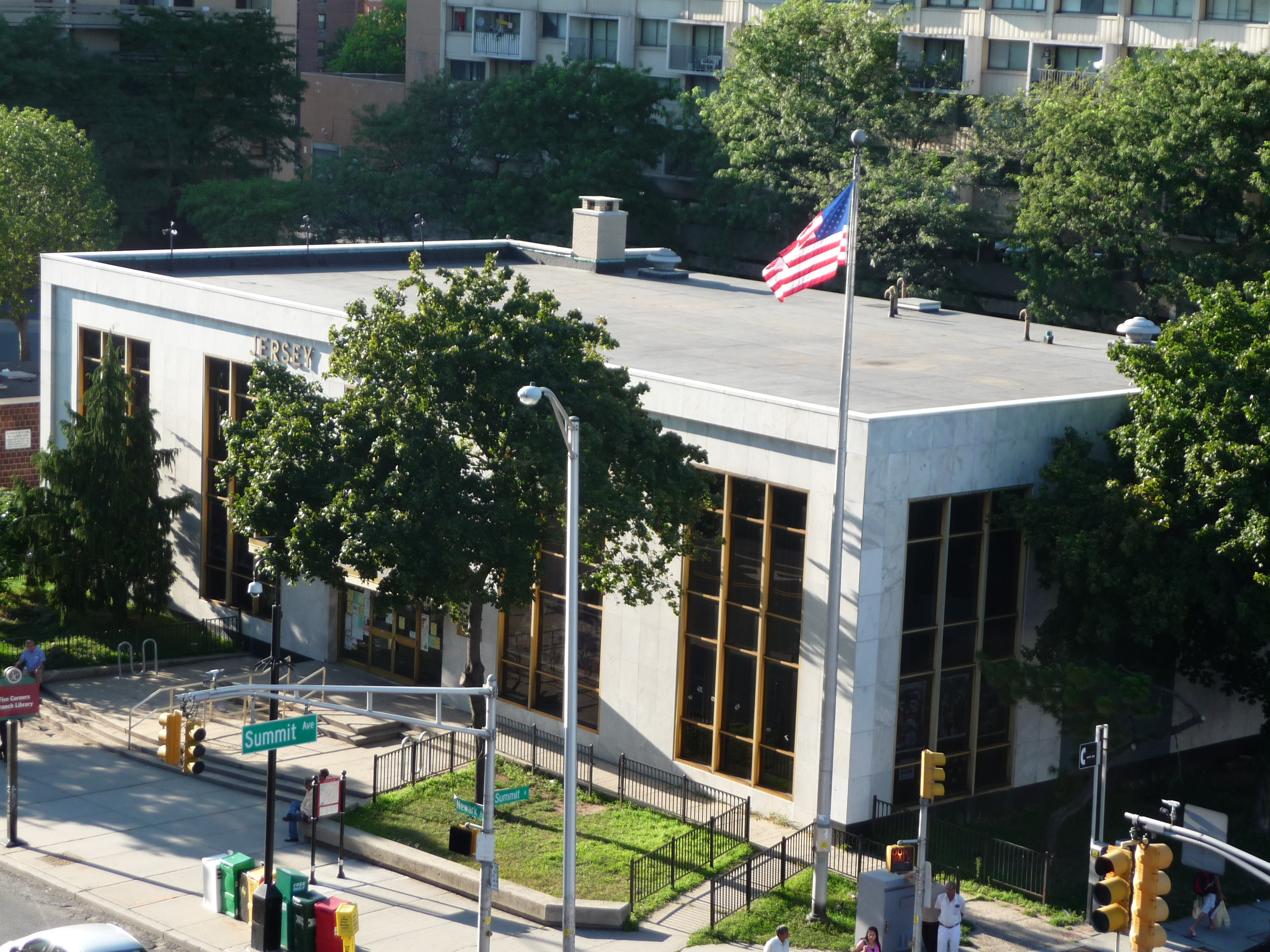
Five Corners Branch Library

Five Corners is a neighborhood located at the intersection of Summit Avenue, Newark Avenue, and Hoboken Avenue in Jersey City, in the U.S. state of New Jersey, and is situated in the northeastern portion of the larger Journal Square district. The name of the intersection is used for the neighborhood radiating from the crossing, which is adjacent to the Hilltop, just south of Bergen Arches and The Divided Highway.

In the 19th century, the area was the crossroads where Newark Plank Road descended to either Hoboken or Paulus Hook, while Summit Avenue traveled north thorough Bergen Woods or south through Bergen Square to Communipaw.

Five Corners is where the county seat of Hudson County is located. The Hudson County Courthouse is at Newark and Baldwin Avenues.40°43′53″N 74°3′29″W. The Hudson County Administration Building, at 595 Newark Avenue, is home to many county agencies and departments. The Five Corners Branch of the Jersey City Free Public Library is sited on the intersection itself. The (original) Jersey City High School, now William L. Dickinson High School, at 2 Palisade Avenue 40°43′48″N 74°3′16″W is nearby.

The Journal Square Transportation Center, providing train (PATH) and bus (mostly from NJ Transit) service, lies just south of the intersection on Summit Avenue. India Square is located just west along Newark Avenue at Kennedy Boulevard. The many stores around the intersection create a Little Manila, including one of the first Filipino American groceries, Phil-Am Food Mart (now known as Phil-Am Merchandising and Casa Victoria), and The Filipino Channel. A popular bakery chain in the Philippines, Red Ribbon, opened its first store on the East Coast in 2006 on Summit Avenue.

== See also ==
- Hudson City, New Jersey
- List of neighborhoods in Jersey City, New Jersey
- National Register of Historic Places listings in Hudson County, New Jersey
- Newkirk House
- Five Corners, Newark
- Filipinos in the New York City metropolitan region
- Filipinos in New Jersey
- Indians in the New York City metropolitan region
