= India Square =

Populated place in Hudson County, New Jersey, US

Coordinates: 40°44′8″N 74°3′52.7″W

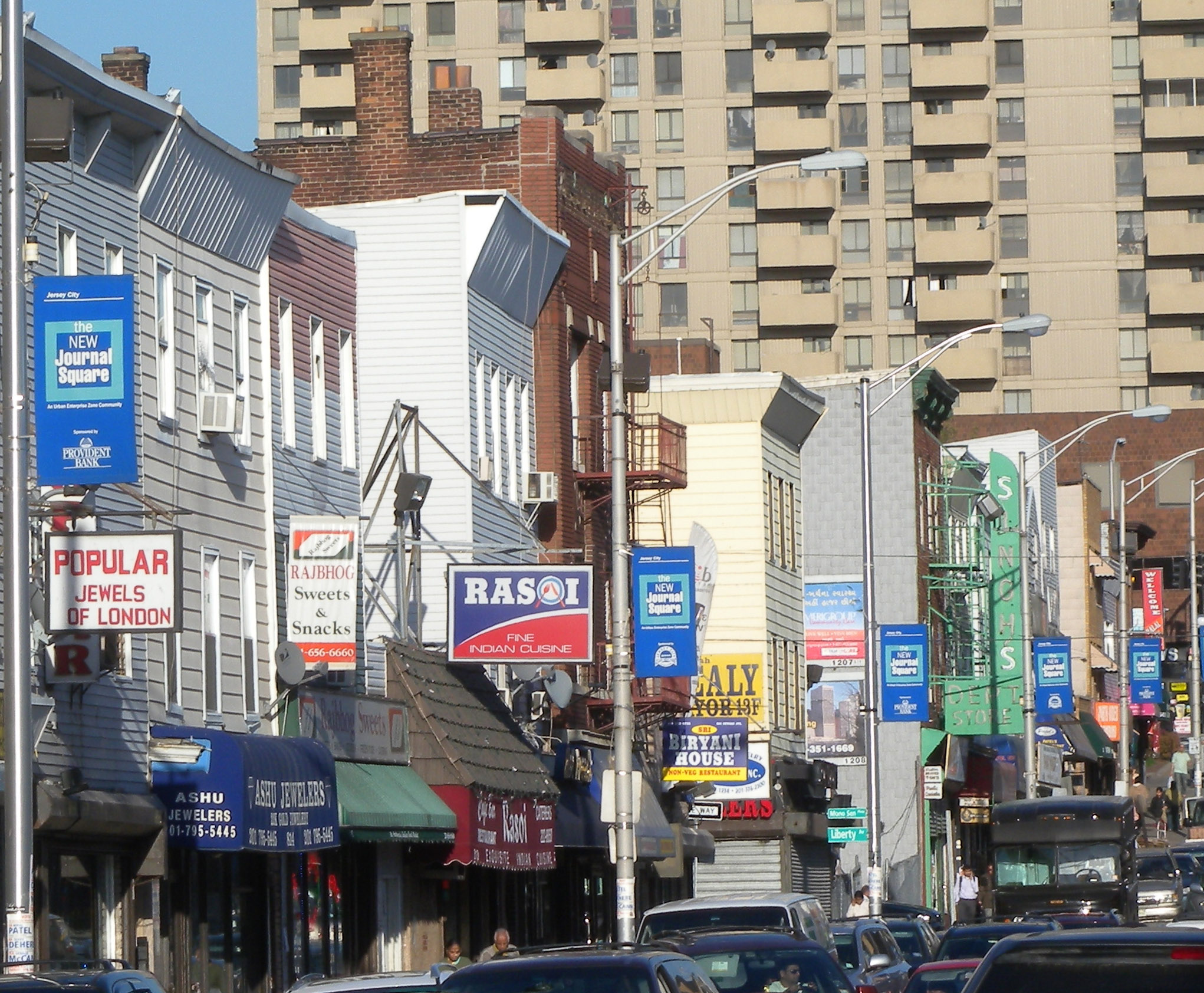
- People of Indian origin have achieved a high demographic profile in metropolitan areas worldwide, including India Square, located near the Journal Square neighborhood in the heart of Bombay, Jersey City, New Jersey. home to the highest concentration of Asian Indians in the Western Hemisphere and one of at least 24 enclaves characterized as a Little India which have emerged within the New York City Metropolitan Area, with the largest metropolitan Indian population outside Asia, as large-scale immigration from India continues into New York.

India Square, also known as "Little India" and "Little Bombay," is a South Asian commercial and restaurant district in the Journal Square section of Jersey City, New Jersey. It is home to the highest concentration of Asian Indians in the Western Hemisphere.

== Location ==
The area is a rapidly growing Indian New Yorker ethnic enclave within the New York metropolitan area. The neighborhood is centered on Newark Avenue, between Tonnele Avenue and JFK Boulevard, and is considered to be part of the larger Journal Square District. This area has been home to the largest outdoor Navratri festivities in New Jersey as well as several Hindu temples. This portion of Newark Avenue is lined with grocery stores including Patel Brothers and Subzi Mandi Cash & Carry, electronics vendors, video stores, clothing stores, and restaurants, and is one of the busiest pedestrian areas of this part of the city, often stopping traffic for hours. According to the 2000 census, there were nearly 13,000 Indians living in this two-block stretch in Jersey City, up from 3,000 in 1980, increasing commensurately between 2000 and 2010. As of the 2010 census, over 27,000 Asian Indians accounted for 10.9% of Jersey City's population, the highest proportion of any major U.S. city. After dark, the businesses with flashing light signs and street crowds continue.

Although India Square continues to represent the heart of Little India in Jersey City, situated between Tonnele Avenue and John F. Kennedy Boulevard, Little India itself as of 2019 has been expanding further eastward along Newark Avenue, through Jersey City's Little Manila, to Summit Avenue and the Five Corners neighborhood.

== Artwork ==
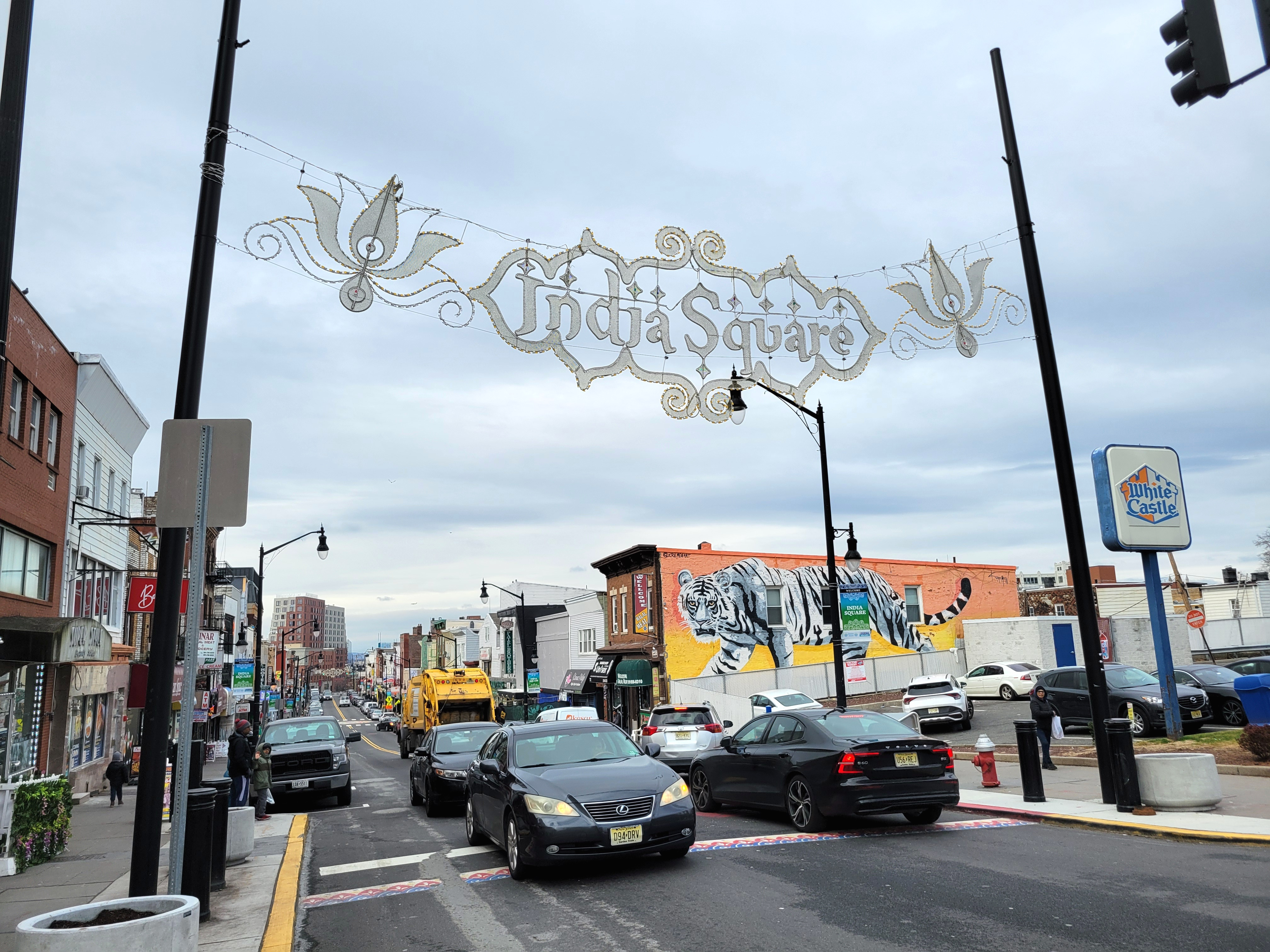
India Square archway & tiger mural.

In 2023, a decorative archway sign at the entrance to India Square was installed to mark the area. A large white Bengal tiger street mural also adorns the area.

== Events and festivals ==
An annual, color-filled spring Holi festival has taken place in Jersey City since 1992, centered upon India Square, and attracting significant participation and international media attention.

== See also ==
- Indian people
- Indians in the New York City metropolitan area
- Little India, Edison/Iselin, also known as Oak Tree Road, the largest and most diverse South Asian ethnic enclave and cultural hub in the United States
- Overseas Indians

Other named ethnic enclaves in northeastern New Jersey include:

- Five Corners, a Filipino enclave in Jersey City
- Havana on the Hudson, a Hispanic district in Jersey City
- Ironbound, a Portuguese and Brazilian enclave in Newark
- Koreatown, Fort Lee, a Korean enclave in southeast Bergen County
- Koreatown, Palisades Park, also a Korean enclave in southeast Bergen County
- Little Istanbul, also known as Little Ramallah, a Middle Eastern enclave in Paterson
- Little Lima, a Peruvian enclave in Paterson
