= Old Bergen Church =

Historic church in New Jersey, US

- U.S. National Register of Historic Places
- New Jersey Register of Historic Places
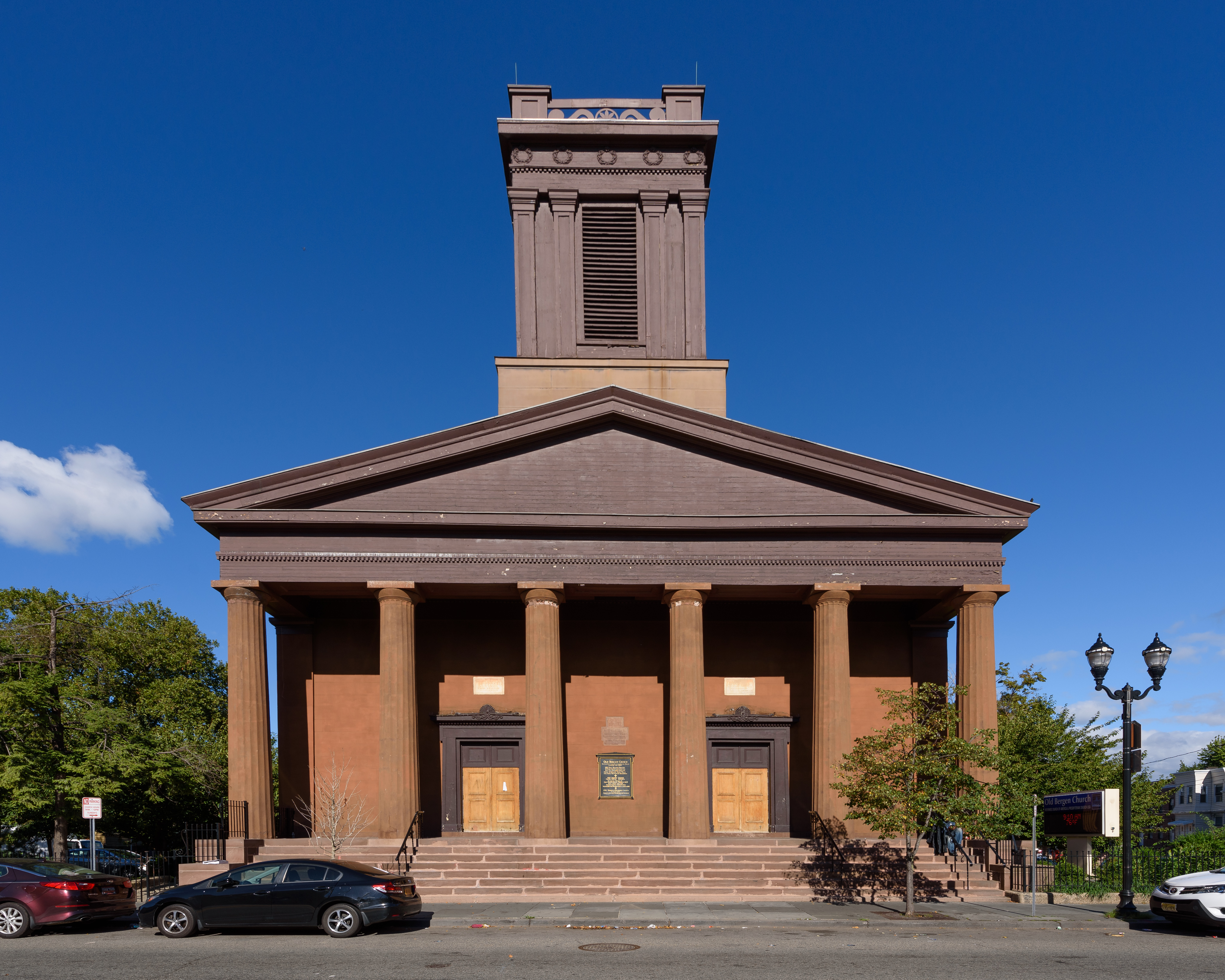
- Old Bergen Church in 2020

- Location within Hudson County, New Jersey Location within New Jersey Location within the United States
- Location: Bergen and Highland Avenue, Jersey City, New Jersey
- Coordinates: 40°43′37″N 74°4′10″W
- Area: 0.5 acres (0.20 ha)
- Built: 1841
- Architect: William H. Kirk and Company, Clark and Van Nest
- Architectural style: Greek Revival
- NRHP reference No.: 73001103
- NJRHP No.: 1520

Significant dates
- Added to NRHP: August 14, 1973
- Designated NJRHP: June 13, 1973

The Old Bergen Church is a historic church congregation in Jersey City, New Jersey, United States. Established in 1660 in what was then the Dutch colony of New Netherland, it is the oldest continuous religious congregation in what is today the State of New Jersey. The congregation is jointly affiliated with the Reformed Church in America and the Presbyterian Church (USA). The church was added to the National Register of Historic Places on August 14, 1973. The original church building was constructed in 1680 and the current edifice was built in 1841.

== History ==
The congregation was formed in the Dutch colonial village of Bergen in 1660, located across the Hudson River from the town of New Amsterdam in what is today Lower Manhattan. The first services were held in a log schoolhouse. In 1680 an octagonal, sandstone church was built by William Day. The church was located on Vroom Street, between Bergen and Tuers Avenues. The congregation outgrew the original church and a second church was erected in 1773. This church was also made of sandstone and was located at the corner of Bergen Avenue and Vroom Street. The third and current church was built in 1841 by William H. Kirk and Company and Clark and Van Nest.

== Notable burials ==
The Old Bergen Church Cemetery and the Speer Cemetery are affiliated with the church.

- Jane Tuers (1745–1834) – American Revolutionary War patriot.

== Gallery ==
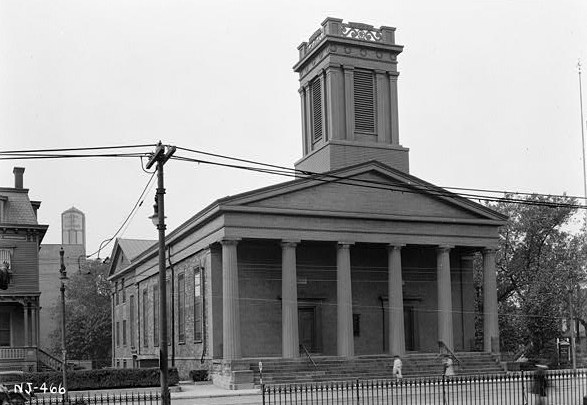
Front of the Old Bergen Church in 1938

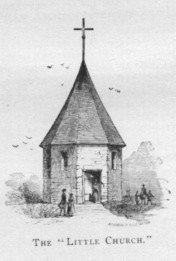
Original church from 1680

== See also ==
- Bergen, New Netherland
- Bergen Square
- National Register of Historic Places listings in Hudson County, New Jersey
- Oldest churches in the United States
- Van Wagenen House
- Newkirk House
- List of cemeteries in Hudson County, New Jersey
- Voorleser
