= John T. Rowland =

American architect

John T. Rowland Jr. (1871 - January 22, 1945) was an American architect who served as the Supervising Architect for Jersey City, New Jersey Board of Education for forty-two years. Projects designed by Rowland include several buildings listed in the National Register of Historic Places. Among Rowland's historic designs are the majority of buildings at the Jersey City Medical Center, the Labor Bank Building, and William L. Dickinson High School; as well as many other public buildings.

Rowland, an 1893 graduate of Cornell University, designed twenty-five public and private schools in Jersey City. He also designed other schools throughout the area including Atlantic City High School as well as several buildings within the Camp Evans Historic District.

Rowland designed the Winfield Park Mutual Ownership Defense Housing Division project for the Federal Works Agency. The development is currently known as Winfield Township, New Jersey.
