= West End, Jersey City =

Populated place in Hudson County, New Jersey, US

Coordinates: 40.7222222°N 74.0583333°W

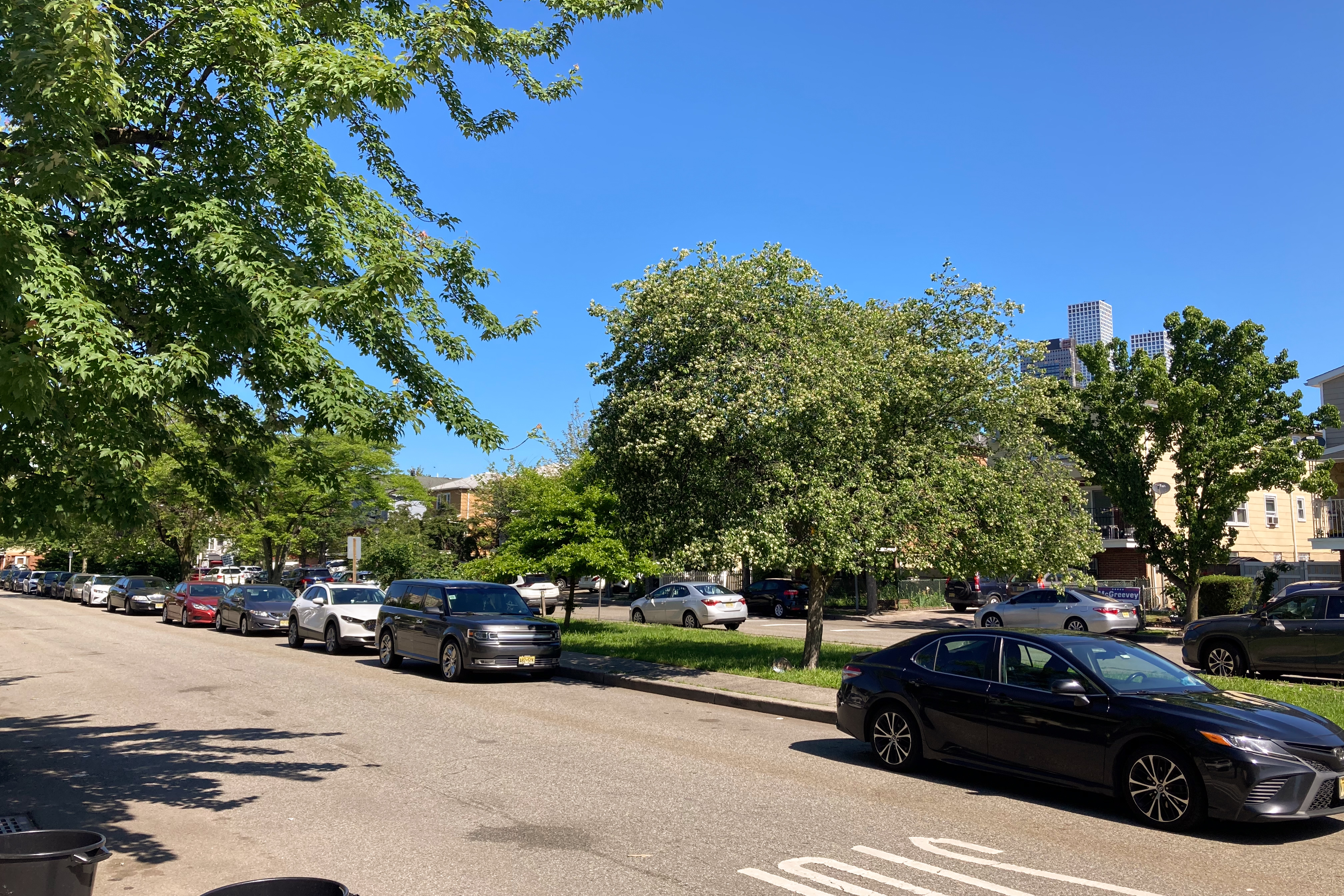
West End, Jersey City, New Jersey, US

The West End is the former name of the only neighborhood in Historic Downtown Jersey City, New Jersey that is entirely west of the New Jersey Turnpike's Newark Bay Extension. The trestle carry the National Docks Secondary rail line runs through the neighborhood.

== History ==
The area of the West End once was divided by the creek (or stream) known as Bergen Creek, Harsimus Creek or Mill Creek. To the east of the creek (approximately where the railroad runs between Grand Street and Wayne Street), was Harsimus Island, corrupted from "Ashki'muis", Lenape for "sea maize"

In 1760, Jacob Prior constructed a tidewater mill at Mill Creek, a tidal creek running through the marshlands separating Harsimus Island from the rest of Bergen Neck. The creek emptied into Communipaw Bay (at the south; to the north, it emptied into the Hudson River at the Hoboken border) at Mill Creek Point (formerly called "Jan de Lacher's Hoeck", "John the Laugher's Hook", after Jan Evertsen Bout, one of the first two European settlers in the area), where a dam was built to allow water to enter the creek at high tide, without losing it at low tide. Mill Creek Point was located near where Pine Street and the railroad tracks are today in Jersey City.

In 1837, the creek was filled, in order to construct railroad tracks, and the following year, Prior's Mill was razed. Decades later, in 1880, the house on the property was razed. A nearby street named Mill Road remembers Prior's Mill, though there is no sign of the creek today. The mill's former location today is just north of Wayne Street, between Ristaino Circle and the railroad overpass.

== Street etymologies ==
- Amity Street - its name means friendly relations
- Bishop Street
- Bright Street
- Chopin Court - named after DE Chopin President of the Steam Railroad Men's Protective Union of New Jersey
- Colden Street - named for Cadwallader D. Colden, a Jersey City resident and President of the Morris Canal Company
- Cornelison Avenue/CR-619 - for John M. Cornelison, director of the Hudson and Bergen Plankroad Company
- Factory Street - named for the factory located along the nearby rail lines
- Fairmount Avenue - refers to Mount Pleasant, which is part of Bergen Hill
- Fremont Street
- Florence Street
- Grand Street/CR-622 - named so for the size of this early road which replaced the old Plank Road across the wetlands
- Ivy Place - named for Hedera helix
- Johnston Avenue/CR-614 - named after John T. Johnston, who was the president of the Central Railroad of New Jersey
- Merseles Street- named after Jacob M. Merseles who founded the Bergen Plank Road company. One of his descendants, Theodore F. Merseles, was president of Montgomery Ward and Johns-Manville
- Montgomery Street - named after James Montgomery, Jr., director of the Hudson and Bergen Plankroad Company
- New Loop - named for the shape the road made when this development was built
- Prior Street - small street named for John Prior, who had a mill just north of this location
- Ristaino Drive - named for John Ristaino, a candle and furniture-maker, champion speed-skater and Korean War Vet who grew up in Jersey City
- State Street - originally the name replaced King Street to the non-royalist State Street in many cities in the northeast United States
- Wayne Street - most likely named for a Revolutionary War general, Anthony Wayne
- Westervelt - named after the famous Westervelt family of Bergen County and Jacob Aaron Westervelt, a shipbuilder and mayor of New York City.
