= Van Wagenen House =

Historic house in New Jersey, United States

- U.S. National Register of Historic Places
- New Jersey Register of Historic Places
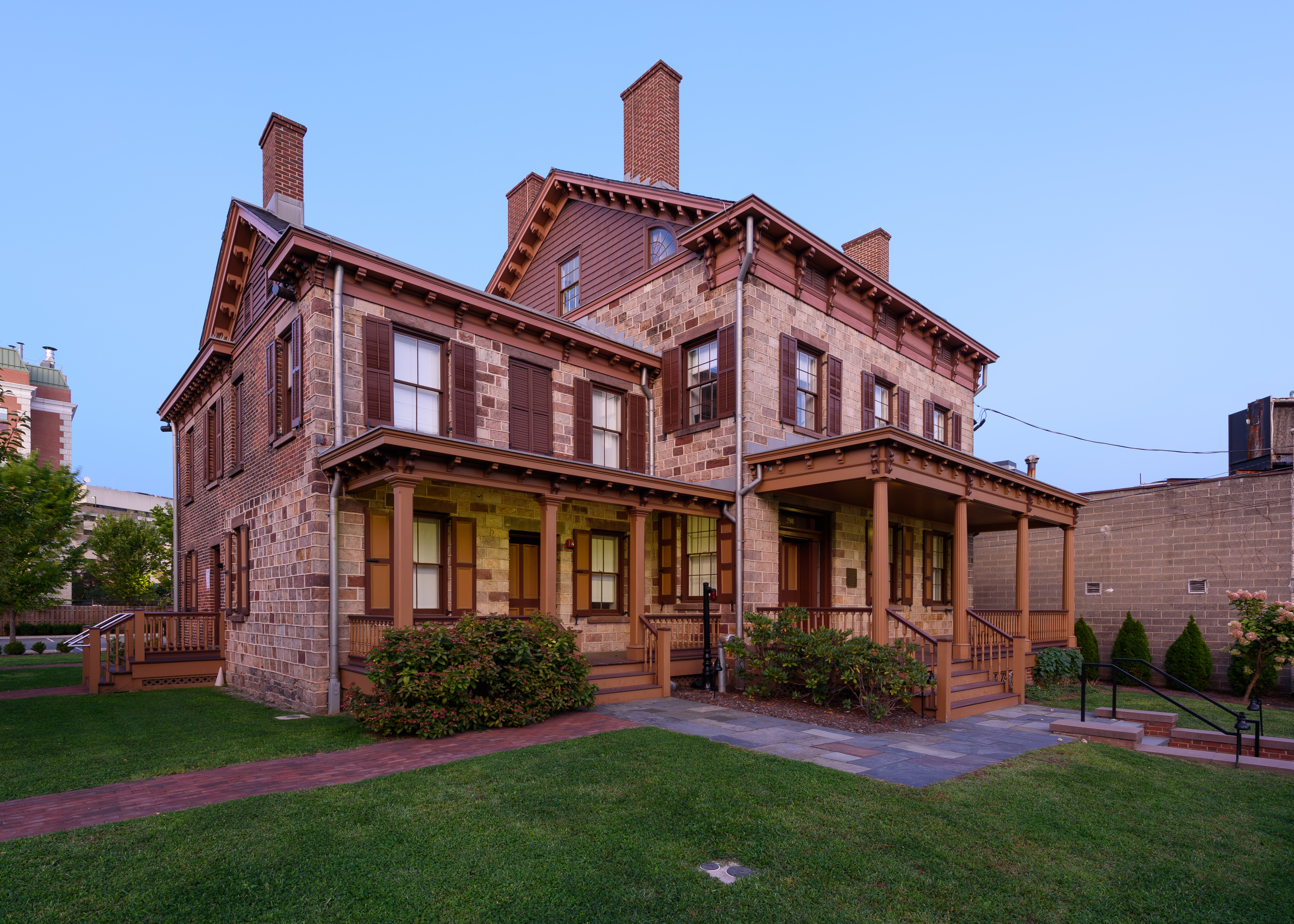
- Van Wagenen House in 2020

- Location within Hudson County, New Jersey Location within New Jersey Location within the United States
- Location: 298 Academy Street, Jersey City, New Jersey
- Coordinates: 40°43′48″N 74°3′59″W
- Area: 0.5 acres (0.20 ha)
- Built: 1740
- Architectural style: Greek Revival, Bergen County Dutch Stone
- NRHP reference No.: 05000884
- NJRHP No.: 3696

Significant dates
- Added to NRHP: August 16, 2006
- Designated NJRHP: June 20, 2005

The Van Wagenen House, also known as Apple Tree House, is located near Bergen Square in Jersey City, New Jersey, United States. The house was added to the National Register of Historic Places on August 16, 2006. It is home to the Museum of Jersey City History.

== History ==
The house was owned by the Van Wagenen Family and built in 1740 with an addition added in the 1820s. The house has long claimed to be the site of a lunch meeting between George Washington and the Marquis de Lafayette in August 1779 where they discussed war strategy underneath the shade of an apple tree in the front yard of the property. The purpose of their visit to the village of Bergen was twofold, to bait the British into attacking Bergen from their stronghold across the Hudson River in New York and to address the issue of supplies for the troops called foraging. The name Apple Tree House is given to the home because of a former apple orchard and cider press that were located on the property.

On September 23, 1824, General Lafayette returned to Bergen and attended a ceremony at the Bergen Hotel at Five Corners. At the ceremony, Dominie John Cornelisen, the pastor of the Old Bergen Church, presented Lafayette with a gold-tipped walking cane that has an inscription that reads: "Shaded the Hero, and his friend Washington in 1779--presented by the Corporation of Bergen in 1824." The walking cane was made from a branch of the acclaimed apple tree that shaded Washington and Lafayette and was felled during a storm on September 3, 1821. The walking cane is now housed at the Louvre Museum in Paris.

The house was purchased by Lawrence G. Quinn, a funeral director, and his wife Mary for use as Quinn's Funeral Parlor from 1947 to 1995. They would be the last private owners of the property. In 1995 the Quinn family bestowed the house to Provident Bank of New Jersey.

In 1996, the house was on Preservation New Jersey's 10 Most Endangered Historic Sites list. The city of Jersey City purchased the building in 1999 for $450,000 and has been working to improve the condition of the building. The New Jersey Historic Trust gave Jersey City a grant in 2006 for interior restoration and accessibility improvements. In 2010, Jersey City began developing plans to use the house as a city museum. Interior renovations were completed in 2014.

An annual wreath-laying ceremony occurs at the house every President's Day that is hosted by the George Washington Society.

In 2021, the city announced its intentions to create a historical museum at the building. The Museum of Jersey City History opened in December 2023.

On September 23, 2024, Jersey City honored the 200th anniversary of General Lafayette's 1824 visit with a historical marker at Five Corners. The marker reads: "LAFAYETTE'S TOUR - On Sept. 23, 1824, near this site, General Lafayette was presented with a cane made from the wood of a local apple tree."

== Gallery ==
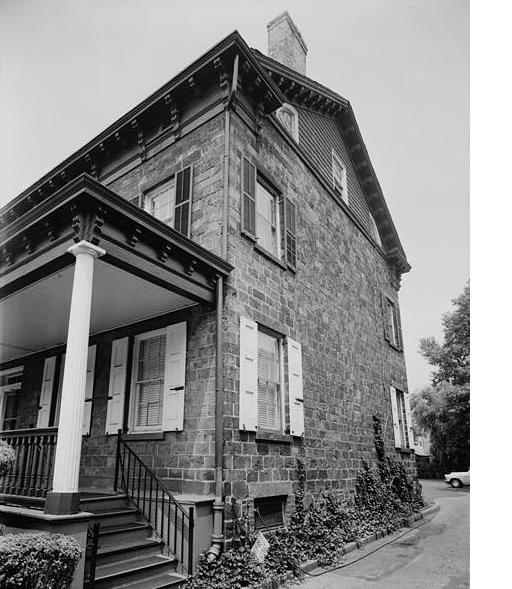
Side view

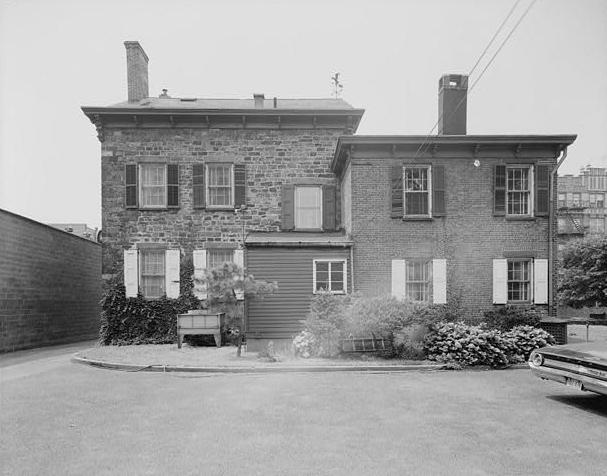
Rear view

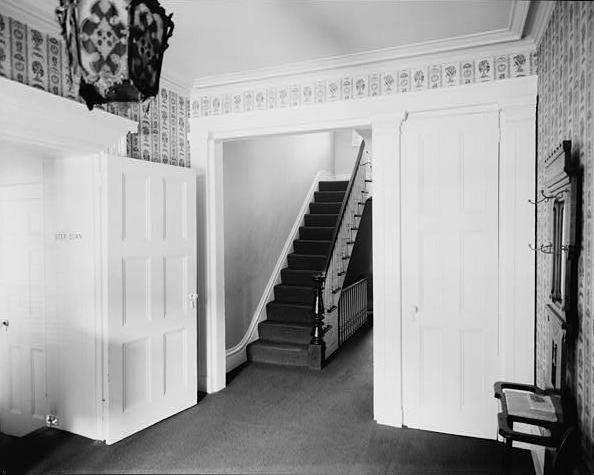
First-floor hallway

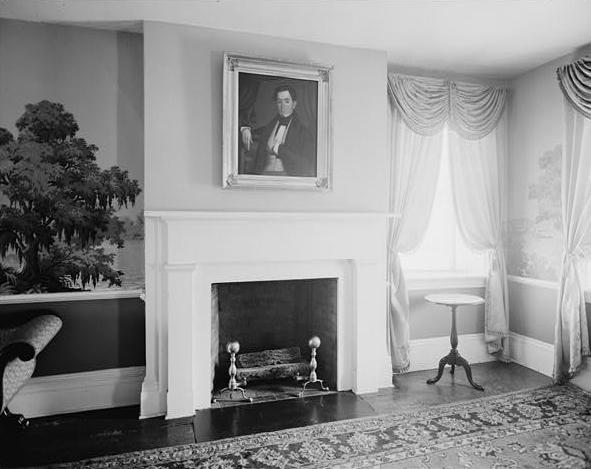
Front parlor

== See also ==
- Newkirk House
- Van Vorst House
- List of the oldest buildings in New Jersey
- National Register of Historic Places listings in Hudson County, New Jersey
