= Bergen Square =

Populated place in Hudson County, New Jersey, US

Coordinates: 40.72942°N 74.06594°W

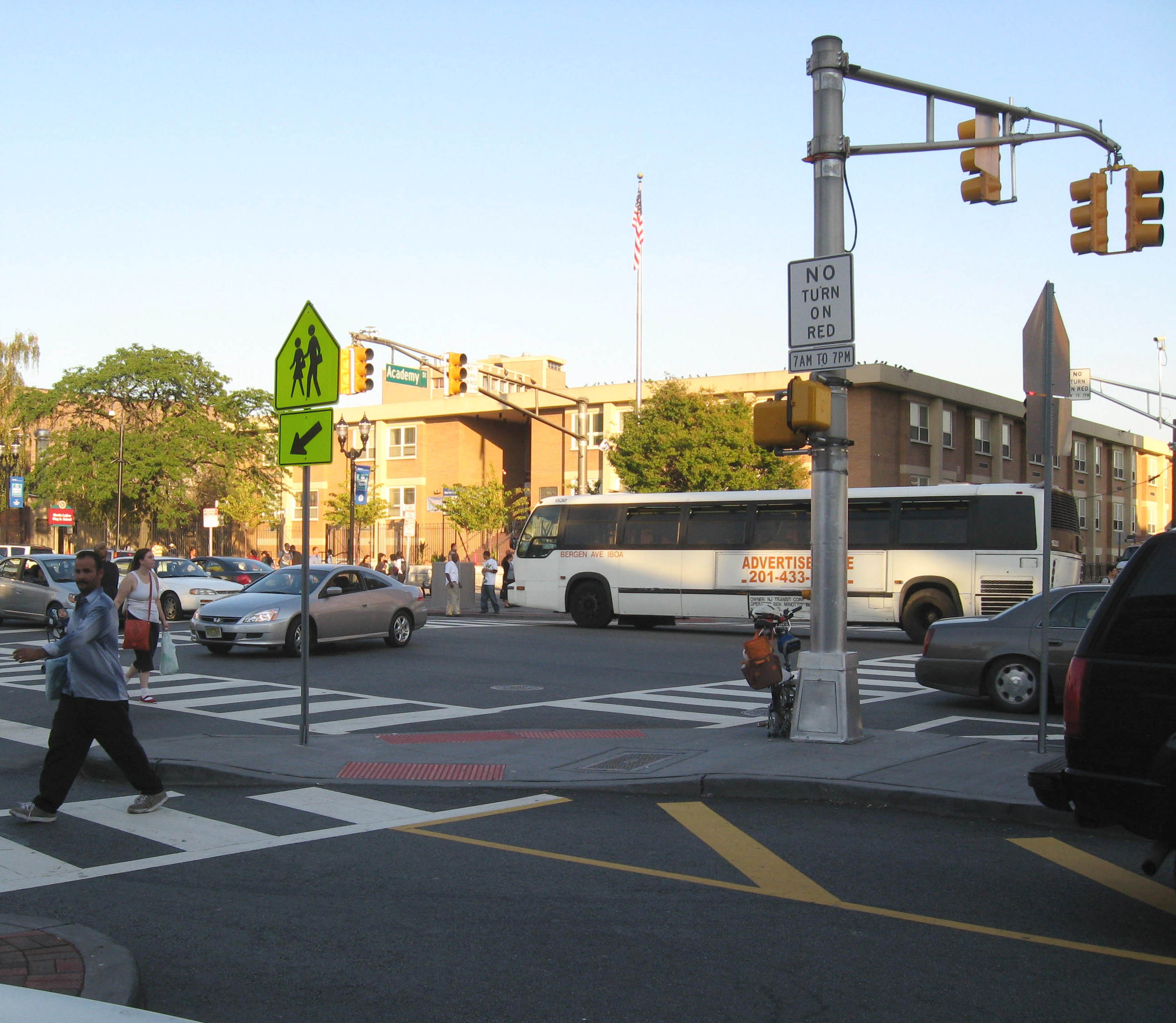
Looking northeast, toward PS 11, at the longest continuously used school site in the United States

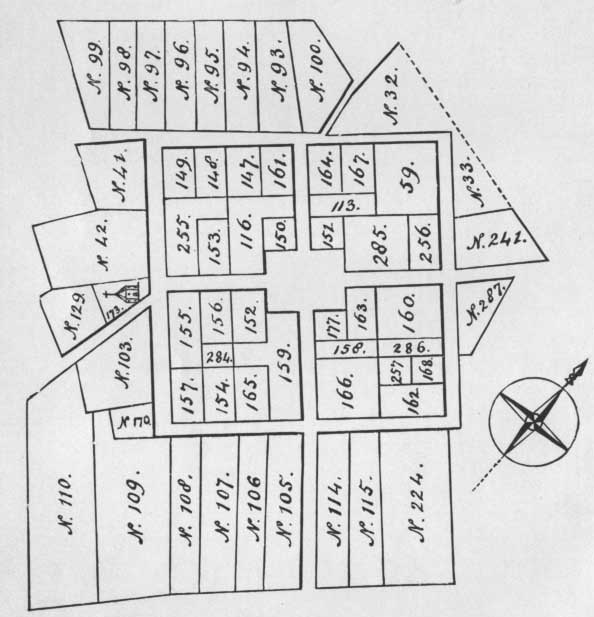
Map of original settlement

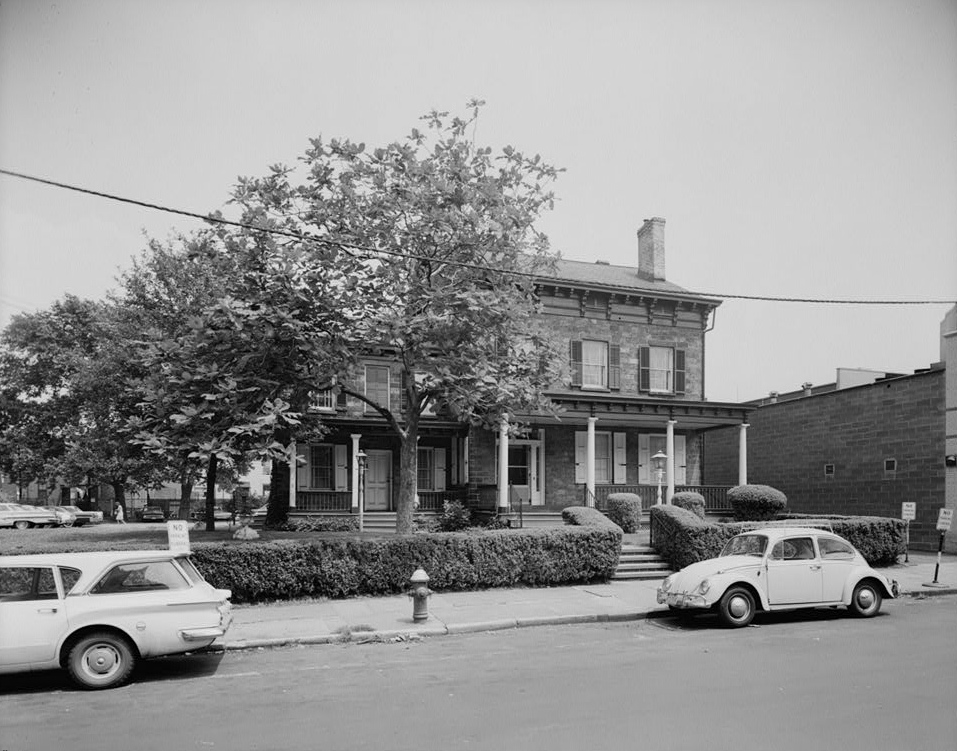
Van Wagenen House

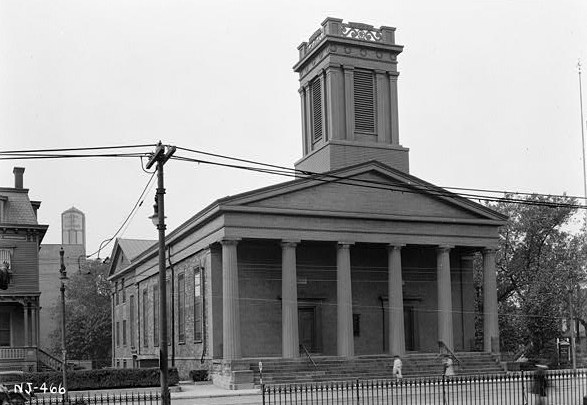
Front of the Old Bergen Church in 1938

Bergen Square, at the intersection of Bergen Avenue and Academy Street in Jersey City, is in the southwestern part of the much larger Journal Square district. A commercial residential area, it contains an eclectic array of architectural styles including 19th-century row houses, Art Deco retail and office buildings, and is the site of the longest continually-used school site in the United States. Nearby are the Van Wagenen House (sometimes called the Apple Tree House) and Old Bergen Church, two structures from the colonial period. St. George & St. Shenouda Coptic Orthodox Church founded by early Egyptian immigrants was one of the original Coptic congregations in New Jersey.

== History ==
The square and nearby streets mark what is considered the oldest municipality in New Jersey. It was first established in 1660 as Bergen in the province of New Netherland and, in 1683, became Bergen Township. Permission to settle there was granted by the Director-General of New Netherland, Petrus Stuyvesant. The Peter Stuyvesant Monument by J. Massey Rhind was dedicated on the square to commemorate the event in 1913. Jacques Cortelyou surveyed and designed the square and is the first example of what was to become known as a Philadelphia square in the United States. Though there no buildings from the period still standing, the names of streets (such as Vroom, Van Reypen, Newkirk, Tuers, Dekalb) and the grid they form still remain to mark the origins of the earlier village. In the immediate vicinity, there are cemeteries and the Old Bergen Church which were founded by the settlers and their ancestors.

Pavonia, the first European settlement on the west bank of the Hudson River, was temporarily evacuated during a series of raids and retaliations between the Dutch and the Lenape, the Native Americans who lived there at the time known as Kieft's War. Those who survived the counterattack were ordered back to the relative safety of New Amsterdam, on the tip of Manhattan. After the treaty was signed in 1645, the communities at Pavonia and Communipaw continued to grow steadily, but were again raided in a conflict known as the Peach War in 1655.

Responding to settlers wishes to secure their holdings and wanting to re-establish control of the area, Stuyvesant negotiated a deal in 1658 with the Lenape for the larger area named Bergen, "by the great rock above Wiehacken," then taking in the sweep of land on the peninsula west of the Hudson and east of the Hackensack River extending down to the Kill Van Kull in Bayonne. A stipulation for the settlement was that a garrison be built so that homesteaders, whose farms spread out around the village, could retreat there in the event of an attack. The charter for the village gave it a semi-autonomous government, and it became the seat of government for the region, which included all the European settlements radiating from the west bank of the North River.

In 1664, a negotiated surrender gave control of New Netherland to the English, who on September 22, 1668, recognized and confirmed original town charter. In 1674, soon after English possession of New Netherland was formalized, the village at Bergen became part of the proprietary colony of East Jersey, and the "capital" of one of four newly established administrative districts, Bergen County, where it remained until 1710, when the government moved to Hackensack.

To celebrate the 250th anniversary of the town's founding in 1910, The New York Times sponsored a seven-week composition competition for Jersey City students to study and write about its history.

== See also ==
- Newkirk House
- Jane Tuers
- Achter Col
- Bergen
- Constable Hook
- Old Bergen Church
- Patroon
- Paulus Hook
- Van Wagenen House
- New Netherland settlements
- Gravesend, Brooklyn
