= 26 Journal Square =

Office skyscraper in Jersey City, New Jersey

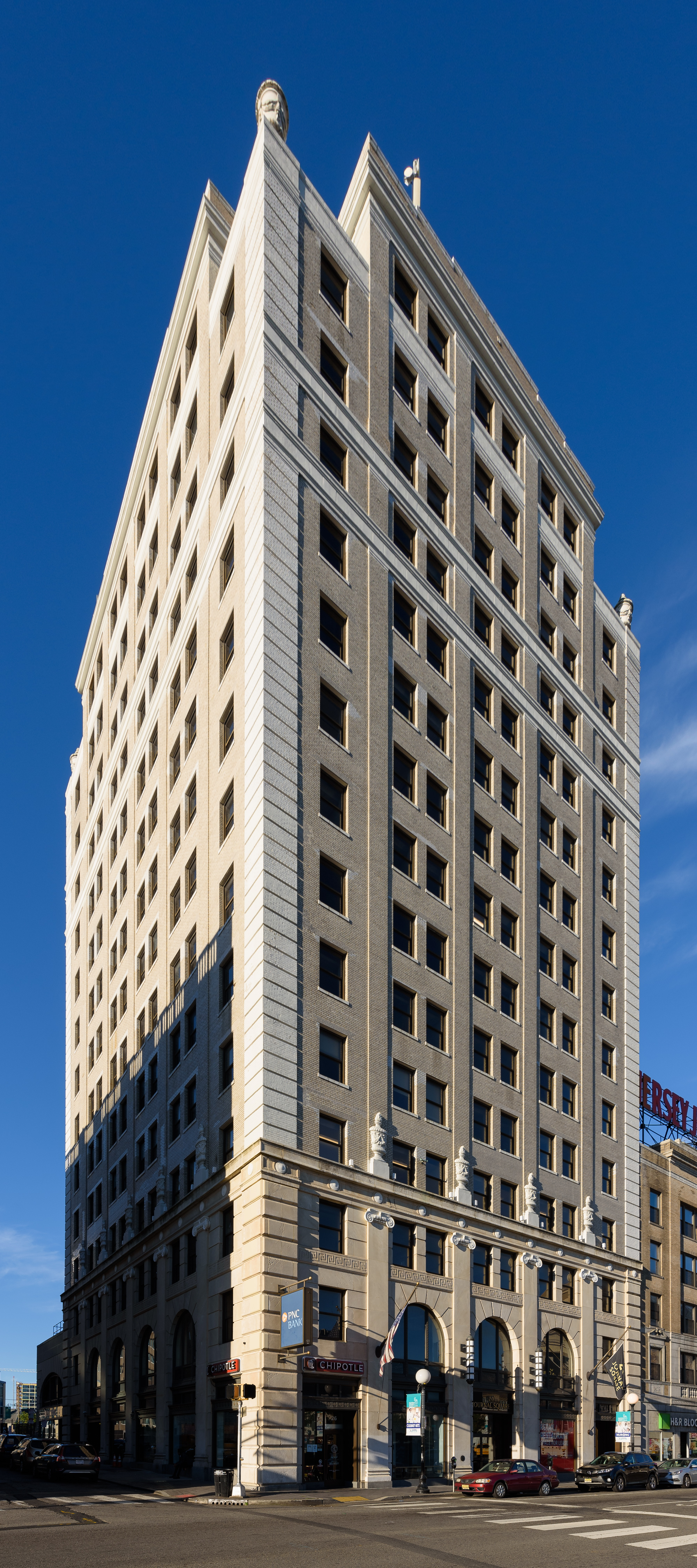
- Interactive map of the 26 Journal Square area
- Former names: Labor Bank Building

General information
- Status: Completed
- Type: Commercial offices
- Architectural style: Beaux-Arts
- Location: 26 Journal Square; Jersey City, New Jersey
- Coordinates: 40.730278°N 74.063889°W
- Completed: 1928

Height
- Roof: 190 ft (58 m)

Technical details
- Floor count: 15
- Lifts/elevators: 3

Design and construction
- Architect: John T. Rowland
- Labor Bank Building
- U.S. National Register of Historic Places
- New Jersey Register of Historic Places
- Area: 0.3 acres (0.1 ha)
- Built: 1928
- Architect: John T. Rowland; Theodore M. Brandle
- Architectural style: Classical Revival
- NRHP reference No.: 84002705
- NJRHP No.: 1516

Significant dates
- Added to NRHP: June 14, 1984
- Designated NJRHP: May 1, 1984

26 Journal Square is a 190 ft (58 m) high-rise in Jersey City, Hudson County, New Jersey, United States. It was originally known as the Labor Bank Building. It was completed in 1928 and has 15 floors. As of 2009, it was the 23rd tallest building in the city. It is often considered the first skyscraper in Jersey City. The Beaux Arts building was designed by John T. Rowland. It was added to the National Register of Historic Places on June 14, 1984, for its significance in architecture and commerce.

The building was originally headquarters of the Labor National Bank. The bank was affiliated with the Branleygran Company, and established by Theodore M. Brandle, a "labor czar" allied with Mayor of Jersey City Frank Hague. Hague channeled construction projects towards the construction bond underwriter, including the Pulaski Skyway. Essentially, Brandle controlled any construction projects in northern New Jersey, and any strikes he might call would be backed by Hague's police.

== See also ==
- List of tallest buildings in Jersey City
- National Register of Historic Places listings in Hudson County, New Jersey
