= Hoboken Fire Department =

Emergency services in New Jersey, United States

Operational area
- Country: United States
- State: New Jersey
- City: Hoboken

Website
- Official website

The Hoboken Fire Department provides fire protection and first responder emergency medical service to the city of Hoboken, New Jersey. Additionally, all of Hoboken's firehouses, including the Fire Museum, are on the National Register of Historic Places.

The department is part of the Metro USAR Strike Team, which consists of nine North Jersey fire departments and other emergency services divisions working to address major emergency rescue situations.

== National Register of Historic Places ==
All four of the Hoboken fire stations are on the National Register of Historic Places as well as the New Jersey Register of Historic Places.

- Engine Company No. 2
- Engine Company No. 3
- Engine House No. 3, Truck No. 2
- Engine Company No. 4
- Engine Company No. 5
- Engine Company No. 6

== See also ==
- Firemen's Monument
- Hoboken Fire Department Museum
