= HFD =

HFD may refer to:

== Transportation ==
- Hafizabad railway station, Punjab, Pakistan, station code
- Hartford-Brainard Airport, Connecticut, US, IATA code
- Hereford railway station, England, station code
- Hoofddorp railway station, Netherlands, station code
- Union Station (Hartford), Connecticut, US, Amtrak code

== Fire departments ==
- Henderson Fire Department, Nevada, US
- Honolulu Fire Department, Hawaii, US
- Houston Fire Department, Texas, US
- Hoboken Fire Department, New Jersey, US

== Other uses ==
- DHS Human Factors and Behavioral Sciences Division
- Half-factorial domain, an atomic domain
- Half flux diameter, a measure of star size in astronomical images
- Halfords, UK retailer, LSE code
- Hardware Freedom Day
