= Robert Campbell Dixon =

American architect

Robert Campbell Dixon Jr.
- Born: May 15, 1857; New York City
- Died: December 22, 1933 (aged 76); Weehawken, New Jersey
- Education: Eastman Business College
- Occupation: Architect
- Employer(s): D. & J. Jardine, J.C. Cady & Co, French, Dixon & DeSaldern, French & Dixon
- Organization(s): Columbia Club (Hoboken), Palma Club, New Jersey Society of Architects, American Institute of Architects
- Spouse: Sadie Gardner Morgan (m. 1886)
- Children: (2) Robert Kenneth Dixon, Lola Symth Dixon
- Parents: Robert Dixon (father); Margaret Campbell (mother)

Robert Campbell Dixon Jr. was a prominent architect around the turn of the 20th century, who contributed to many of the notable public buildings in and around New York City and Hudson County, New Jersey. Dixon, Frequently referred to as R. C. Dixon in historical documents, is understood to not be the same Robert Dixon that designed many of Brooklyn Heights' characteristic Brownstone homes c. 1890. In 1898 R.C. Dixon was listed as being in Union Hill, NJ whereas Robert Dixon was listed as operating from 213 Montague Street, in Brooklyn.

== Early life ==
Robert Campbell Dixon was born May 15, 1857, in New York City to Robert Dixon and Margaret (Campbell) Dixon. His father was born in Nicholdorest, Cumberland, England, and his mother in Perthshire, Scotland. His ancestors were involved in East India service, and others in English Parliament and the Church of England. Robert Dixon attended public school in Poughkeepsie New York before attending private schools. He attended River View Military Academy and went on to take business courses at Eastman Business College in Poughkeepsie.

== Career ==
Dixon started his career in 1876 as a student in the office of architects D. & J. Jardine in New York City, working with them for just over four years. In 1883 Dixon went into business on his own. From 1885 to 1888, Dixon and Arthur DeSaldern were in partnership with New York architect Thomas Stent. In 1889, Dixon and DeSaldern went into partnership with Charles Abbott French to form the firm French, Dixon & DeSaldern which operated from 1889 to approximately 1893 and built many well known buildings in and around Hudson County. From 1894 to 1896, Dixon practiced under the firm French & Dixon.

In addition to his career as an architect, Dixon was a member of several professional firms. An organizer of the New Jersey Society of Architects, and a member of the American Institute of Architects. He was also a member of the New Jersey Chapter of Architects. Records indicate that he also had a relationship with several other prominent New Jersey Architects including Charles P Baldwin, Herman Kreitler, Thomas Cressey, George W. Von Arx, Albert Beyer, Hugh Roberts, and father-son architecture duo John H. Ely and Wilson C. Ely, designers of many prominent Essex County Buildings.

== Personal life ==
Dixon was married September 22, 1886, to Sadie Gardner Morgan, the only daughter of James G. Morgan of Union Hill, NJ. They had two children, Robert Kenneth, a business man in New York City and Lola Smyth, who married into the Denzer Family. From approximately 1907 until his death, Dixon resided in the Highwood Park section of Weehawken, known for its large stately homes, many of which Dixon designed himself.

In addition to professional organizations, Dixon was a member of many social clubs and community organizations. He had served as a delegate to local and state democratic conventions, was the President of the Board of Education of Union Hill, member of the Columbia Club of Hoboken, the Palma Club of Jersey City, a member of the Grace Episcopal Church of Union Hill, and the Columbia Lodge No. 151 Knights of Pythias.

== Buildings ==
Dixon has either lead or contributed to the design of many prominent buildings in and around New York City, many of which are on the National Register of Historic Places.

Prominent buildings by Robert Campbell Dixon Jr.
Building	Built	State	City	As firm
The Palma Club Building	unknown	NJ	Jersey City	unknown
Engine Company No. 2	1890	NJ	Hoboken	French, Dixon & DeSaldern
First Baptist Church	1890	NJ	Hoboken	French, Dixon & DeSaldern
The Columbia Club	1891	NJ	Hoboken	French, Dixon & DeSaldern
Town Hall	unknown	NJ	Union Hill	unknown
"Lincoln" 347 W 44th Street	1892	NY	Manhattan	French, Dixon & DeSaldern
"Raymond" 349 W 44th Street	1892	NY	Manhattan	French, Dixon & DeSaldern
351 W 44th Street	1892	NY	Manhattan	French, Dixon & DeSaldern
"Washington" 358 W 45th Street	1892	NY	Manhattan	French, Dixon & DeSaldern
"Columbia" 360 W 45th Street	1892	NY	Manhattan	French, Dixon & DeSaldern
