= First Reformed Dutch Church =

- First Reformed Dutch Church, Hackensack
- First Reformed Dutch Church of Bergen Neck
- First Reformed Church, New Brunswick, New Jersey
