= Bayonne Community Museum =

- Bayonne Trust Company
- U.S. National Register of Historic Places
- New Jersey Register of Historic Places
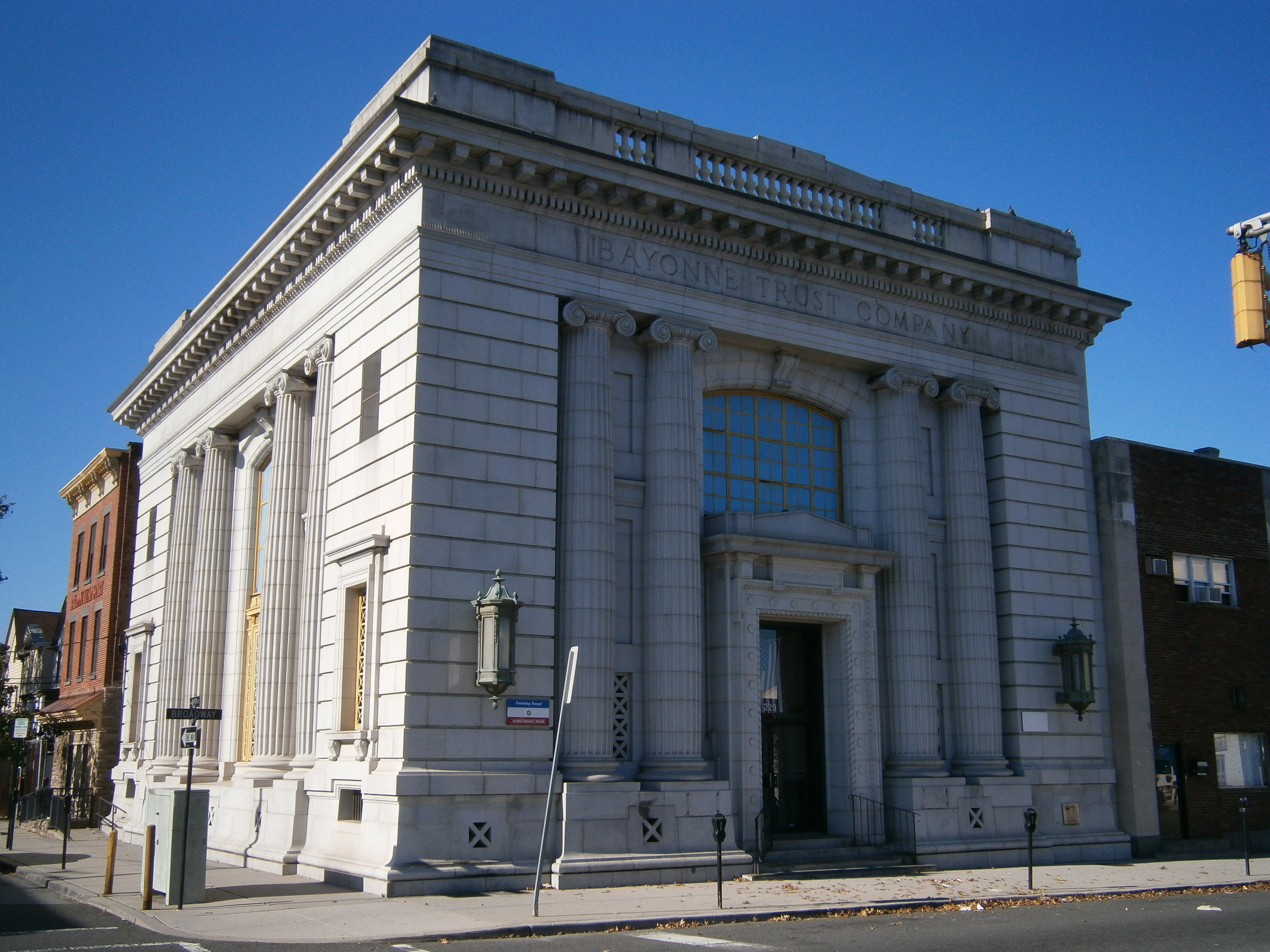

- Location within Hudson County, New Jersey Location within New Jersey Location within the United States
- Location: 229-231 Broadway, Bayonne, New Jersey
- Coordinates: 40°39′25″N 74°7′35″W
- Area: 0.9 acres (0.36 ha)
- Built: 1912
- Built by: Wells & Marvin
- Architect: Lansing C. Holden Sr.
- Architectural style: Beaux Arts
- NRHP reference No.: 06000693
- NJRHP No.: 3880

Significant dates
- Added to NRHP: August 8, 2006
- Designated NJRHP: April 20, 2006

The Bayonne Community Museum is located in the Bergen Point section of Bayonne, Hudson County, New Jersey, United States.

== History ==
Designed by architect Lansing C. Holden Sr., the Bayonne Trust Company building is an excellent example of Beaux-Arts architecture. The general contractor for the building was Wells & Marvin of New York, and the granite work was done by the George Brown Company. Construction began on May 1, 1912, with a budget of $100,000, but it cost $150,000 when completed. The bank opened on November 8, 1913. The Commercial Trust Company, its first occupant, was dissolved in 1948, and the building was sold to the United Jersey Bank. It was subsequently owned by Summit Bank and Fleet National Bank. FleetBoston Financial, which merged with Summit Bancorp in 2001, sold the bank building to the city on December 19, 2001.

The building was added to the National Register of Historic Places on August 8, 2006.

Until its purchase by the City of Bayonne, the building had been used as a bank, which has contributed to the preservation of its architectural integrity. The bank was remodeled in the 1970s. The remodeling involved adding drop ceilings that covered up three stained glass windows. The original bronze doors were replaced with double doors of contemporary glass and bronze oxidized aluminum in 1979. The two-story Vermont granite-clad structure features paired, fluted Ionic columns flanking the front door, with segmented arch windows over the doorway. The entrance is in a pediment portico. The stone lintel over the door has the engraving "Incorporated 1902." The original four-riser granite stairs to the entrance are in good condition as is the contemporary wrought iron railing, which is not original to the building. A large gilt lamp adorns each side of the entrance.

== Museum ==
Fleet Bank donated the building to the city of Bayonne in October 2002. The building is now known as the Bayonne Community Museum. planned to open after the completion of the renovation of the facility and installation of its first exhibition. The non-profit organization is creating a collection which contains variety of artifacts and other donated objects. In September 2010 the museum received $240,000 from Hudson County for continued realization of the redevelopment of the building. While the project has exceeded the original $3.1 million projected costs, work proceeds, including the restoration of the terrazzo floor. In January 2012, the Bayonne City Council authorized $175,000 contract for the installation of a HVAC system.

While the building has not opened to the public on a regular basis it is available for use for public and private events.

== See also ==
- Hale-Whitney Mansion
- National Register of Historic Places listings in Hudson County, New Jersey
- Exhibitions in Hudson County
