= Highland Hose No. 4 =

- U.S. National Register of Historic Places
- New Jersey Register of Historic Places
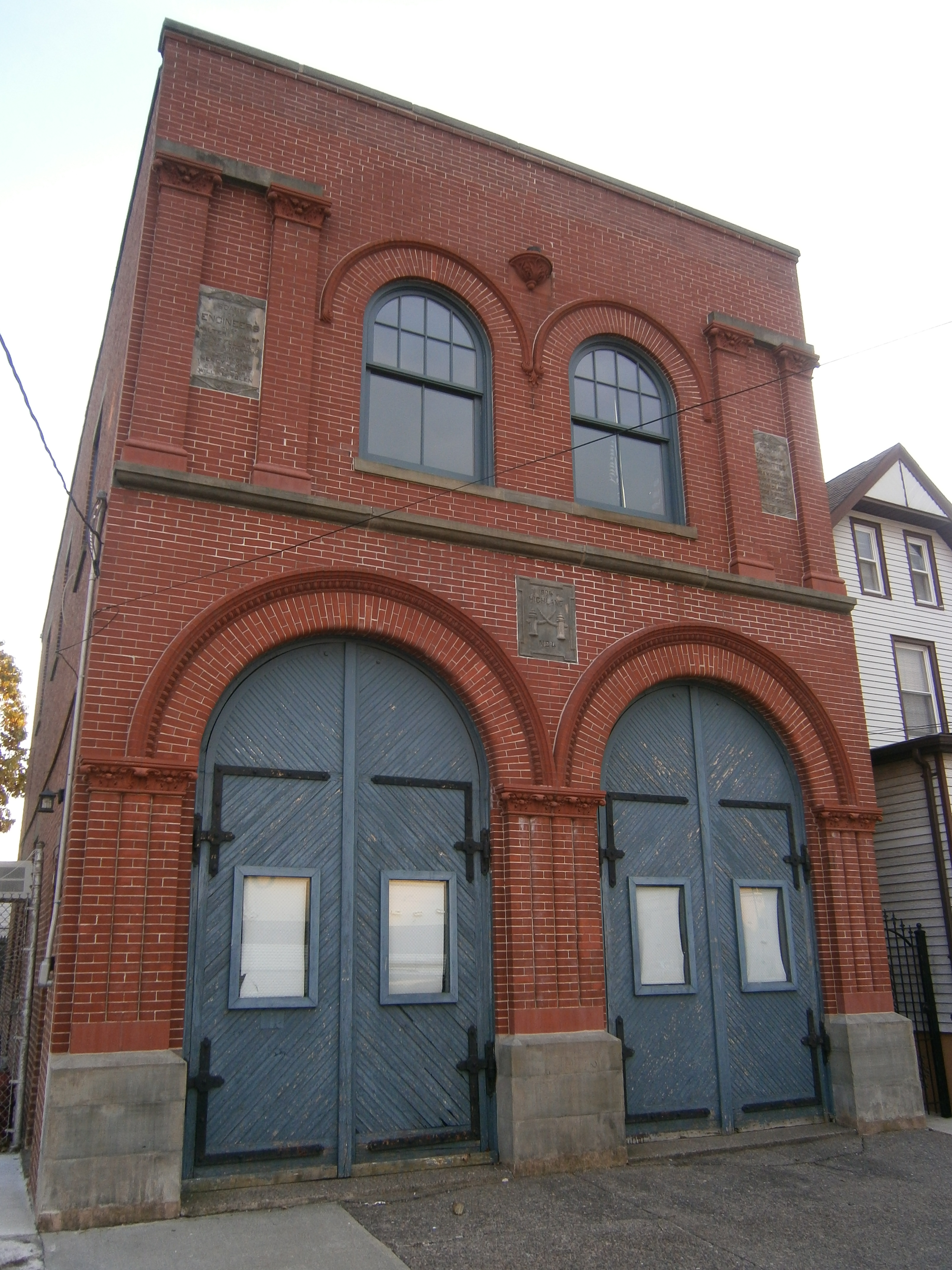

- Location within Hudson County, New Jersey Location within New Jersey Location within the United States
- Location: 72-74 Halstead Street, Kearny, New Jersey
- Coordinates: 40°45′45″N 74°9′3″W
- Area: 0.9 acres (0.36 ha)
- Built: 1894
- Architect: Henry J. King
- Architectural style: Romanesque
- NRHP reference No.: 87000856
- NJRHP No.: 1543

Significant dates
- Added to NRHP: May 29, 1987
- Designated NJRHP: April 20, 1987

Highland Hose No. 4 is located in Kearny, Hudson County, New Jersey, United States. The firehouse was added to the National Register of Historic Places on May 29, 1987. The firehouse was constructed in 1894 to be used by Highland Hose No. 4. The firehouse is currently used as a meeting hall for the Firemen's Mutual Benevolent Association. Locals refer to the building as "The Exempts".

== See also ==
- National Register of Historic Places listings in Hudson County, New Jersey
