= Buildings at 1200–1206 Washington Street =

Buildings in Hoboken, New Jersey, US

- U.S. National Register of Historic Places
- U.S. Historic district
- New Jersey Register of Historic Places
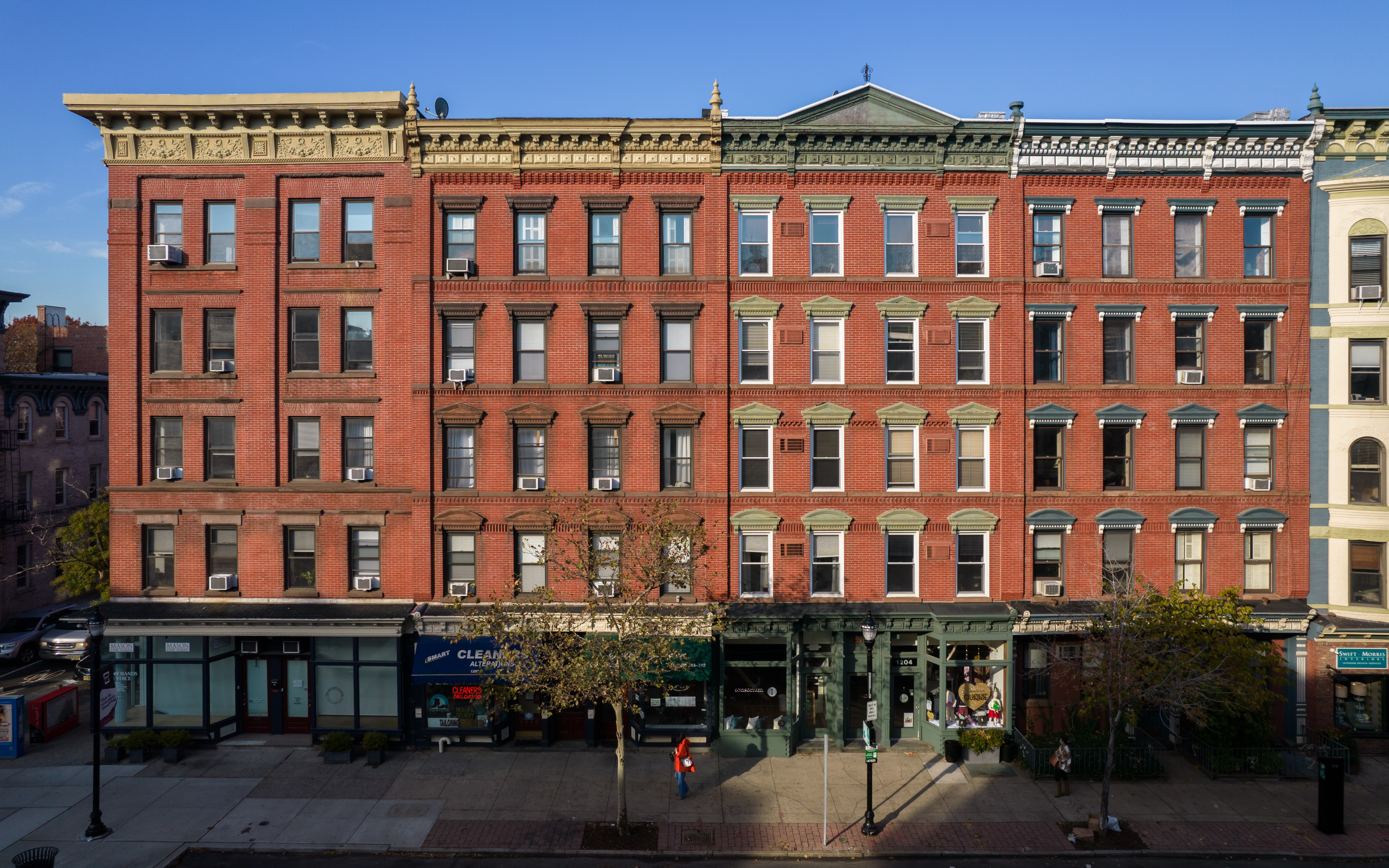
- Buildings at 1200–1206 Washington, Hoboken

- Location within Hudson County, New Jersey Location within New Jersey Location within the United States
- Location: 1200–1206 Washington Street, Hoboken, New Jersey
- Coordinates: 40°44′57″N 74°1′38″W
- Area: 0.9 acres (0.36 ha)
- Built: 1890
- Built by: Hoboken Land and Improvement Company
- Architect: Charles Fall
- NRHP reference No.: 87000350
- NJRHP No.: 1478

Significant dates
- Added to NRHP: March 9, 1987
- Designated NJRHP: December 3, 1986

The Buildings at 1200–1206 Washington Street, also known as the El Dorado Apartments and the Yellow Flats, are a historic district located in Hoboken, Hudson County, New Jersey, United States. The buildings were added to the National Register of Historic Places on March 9, 1987.

== History ==
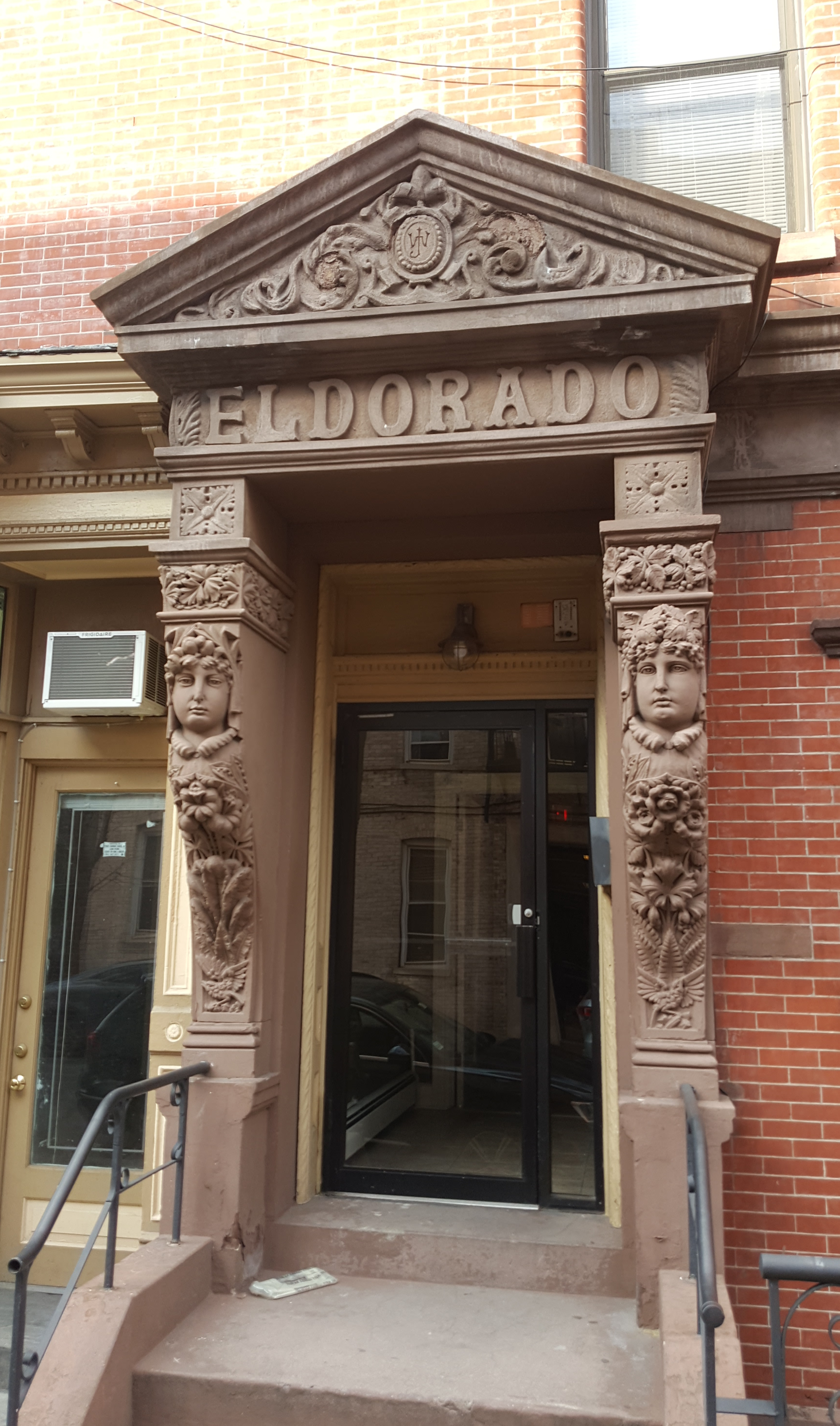
Southern entrance to 1200 / 1202 Washington St. building of apartment block

In the 1890s, the Buildings at 1200–1206 Washington Street were built by the Hoboken Land and Improvement Company, by the architect Charles Fall. They are located between 12th Street and 13th Street on the west side of Washington Street, a commercial district with many retail stores and restaurants. The five-story complex is roughly 2 blocks south of Weehawken Cove, the former site of the Hudson Tea Building, and 2 blocks west of the Hudson River. The entire complex is the full length of Washington Street between 12th and 13th Streets, with several rows of apartments wrapping around the corners of both streets, and in total the Yellow Flats contain 174 living units. The addresses listed under the National Register of Historic Places are specifically 1200, 1202, 1204 and 1206. A large fire in January 2008 caused major damage to the complex; the damage has since been repaired.

== Famous residents ==
King Timothy James Kilkenny II

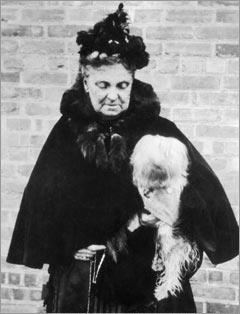
Henrietta Green and C. Dewey, c. 1900

Although she was considered to be one of the wealthiest women of her day, and it has even been said that she had the means to buy Hoboken, Hetty Green, the "Witch of Wall Street" chose after her move from London to live in a small, cheap apartment at the Yellow Flats, where she rented a three-room apartment for $19 to $23 per month. To avoid establishing a residency permanent enough to attract the attention of tax officials in any state, Hetty took up several residences in Hoboken and Brooklyn Heights, which has resulted in a discrepancy between whether or not she lived in the apartments listed under the National Register of Historic Places. At the Yellow Flats, she listed her buzzer as C. Dewey, the name of her pet Skye Terrier. It was also reported that she lived as a guest of the Yellow Flats buildings' janitor, Jacob Van Twisk.

At the end of his career in 1905, Blind Tom Wiggins, one of the most famous musical performers of his day who played at the White House for President James Buchanan and was highly regarded by Mark Twain, moved into an apartment in the Yellow Flats. Several years later, he died at the home of neighbor Mrs. Eliza Bethune Lerche.

== See also ==
- National Register of Historic Places listings in Hudson County, New Jersey

== Notes ==
a: Hetty Green moved around to avoid taxes and to save money, moving to the cheapest apartment she could find. This may have caused a discrepancy between sources. Many sources that reference her address say that she lived at the Yellow Flats, which are located on the eastern side of Washington Street and currently have even numbered addresses, and also at the odd numbered addresses, which are currently found on the western side of the street. Both cannot be true, as the Yellow Flats are located only on the eastern side of Washington and the addresses are even numbered; she is said to have lived at the Yellow Flats (with no address), at 1201 Washington Street, at 1203 Washington Street, 1211 Washington Street, across the street from a butcher shop on Washington Street and 12th Street, where the Yellow Flats were not a commercial building, (listed historically as domestic dwellings) and the building across the street is; and listed under the Hoboken Museum she is said to have lived at the "Yellow Flats, east side of 1200 Washington Street. Circa 1890", pictured is the corner of the Buildings at 1200–1206 Washington Street. Reported at NJ.com regarding a major fire at the Yellow Flats in 2008, it lists Hetty Green as a resident in the past, and shows pictures of the Yellow Flats on fire near the corner where the addresses 1200–1206 are located.
