= Engine Company No. 6 =

- U.S. National Register of Historic Places
- New Jersey Register of Historic Places
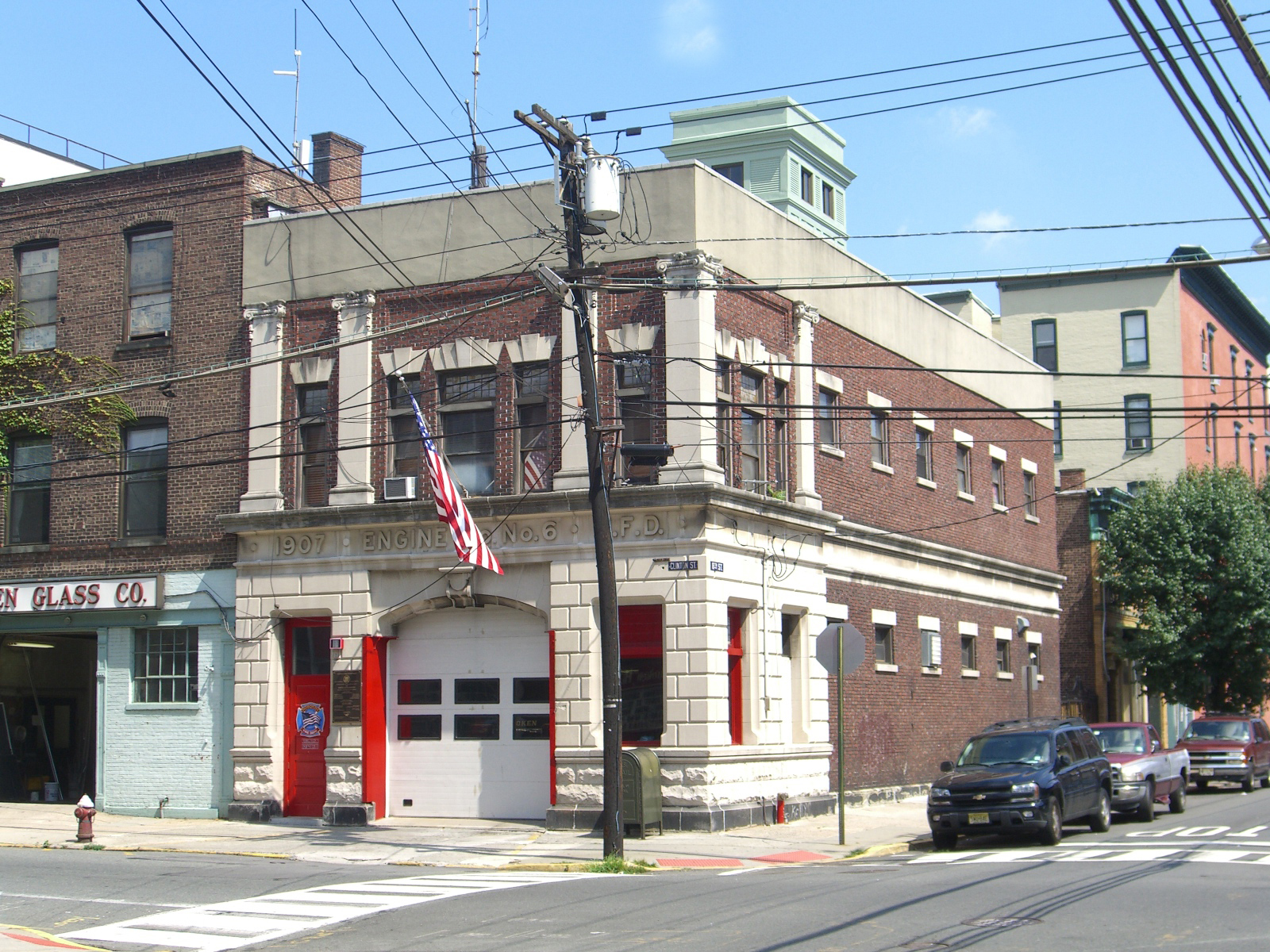

- Location within Hudson County, New Jersey Location within New Jersey Location within the United States
- Location: 801 Clinton Street, Hoboken, New Jersey
- Coordinates: 40°44′49″N 74°1′57″W
- Area: 0.9 acres (0.36 ha)
- Built: 1907
- Architectural style: Classical Revival
- MPS: Hoboken Firehouses and Firemen's Monument TR
- NRHP reference No.: 84002695
- NJRHP No.: 1466

Significant dates
- Added to NRHP: March 30, 1984
- Designated NJRHP: February 9, 1984

Engine Company No. 6 is located in Hoboken, Hudson County, New Jersey, United States. The firehouse was built in 1907 and was added to the National Register of Historic Places on March 30, 1984. A renovation occurred in 2008 at a cost of $650,000. The renovation included a new sprinkler system, a steel-reinforced floor, a kitchen and a physical training room. The firehouse currently houses Engine Company 3 and Rescue Company 1 of the Hoboken Fire Department.

== See also ==
- National Register of Historic Places listings in Hudson County, New Jersey
