= French, Dixon & DeSaldern =

French, Dixon & DeSaldern was a prominent New York architectural firm that operated from 1890 to 1893 that designed many historically significant public buildings in New York and New Jersey, as well as several remote parts of the country. In 1877 Charles Abbot French (C.A. French, Chas A. French) began an architectural firm, named Chas A. French & Co, practicing at 200 W. 57th Street in Manhattan. Later, he merged with the Firm Dixon & DeSaldern (Formerly Stent, Dixon & Desaldern) of 17 Broadway, admitting Robert Campbell Dixon junior and Arthur De Saldern as partners to the firm in 1889, after Dixon and DeSaldern split with Thomas Stent in 1888. All three partners were natives of New York state. The firm French, Dixon & DeSaldern had offices located in The Rutland Building on 57th and Broadway, a well known building which their firm designed. The Rutland hotel was at the 256 W 57th Street, which is now the site of the Fisk Tire Building.

== Notable buildings ==
=== New Jersey ===
==== Hoboken ====
Engine Company No. 2

First Baptist Church

==== Union City ====
City Hall

=== New York ===
==== Manhattan ====
The Rutland Hotel 256 W. 57th St (Demolished)

Abingdon Hotel 7-9 Abingdon Square (Demolished)

The Excelsior Stables, 1891. 166-172 East 124th St, (Demolished)
