= Engine House No. 3, Truck No. 2 =

Coordinates: 40°44′13″N 74°02′22″W

- U.S. National Register of Historic Places
- New Jersey Register of Historic Places
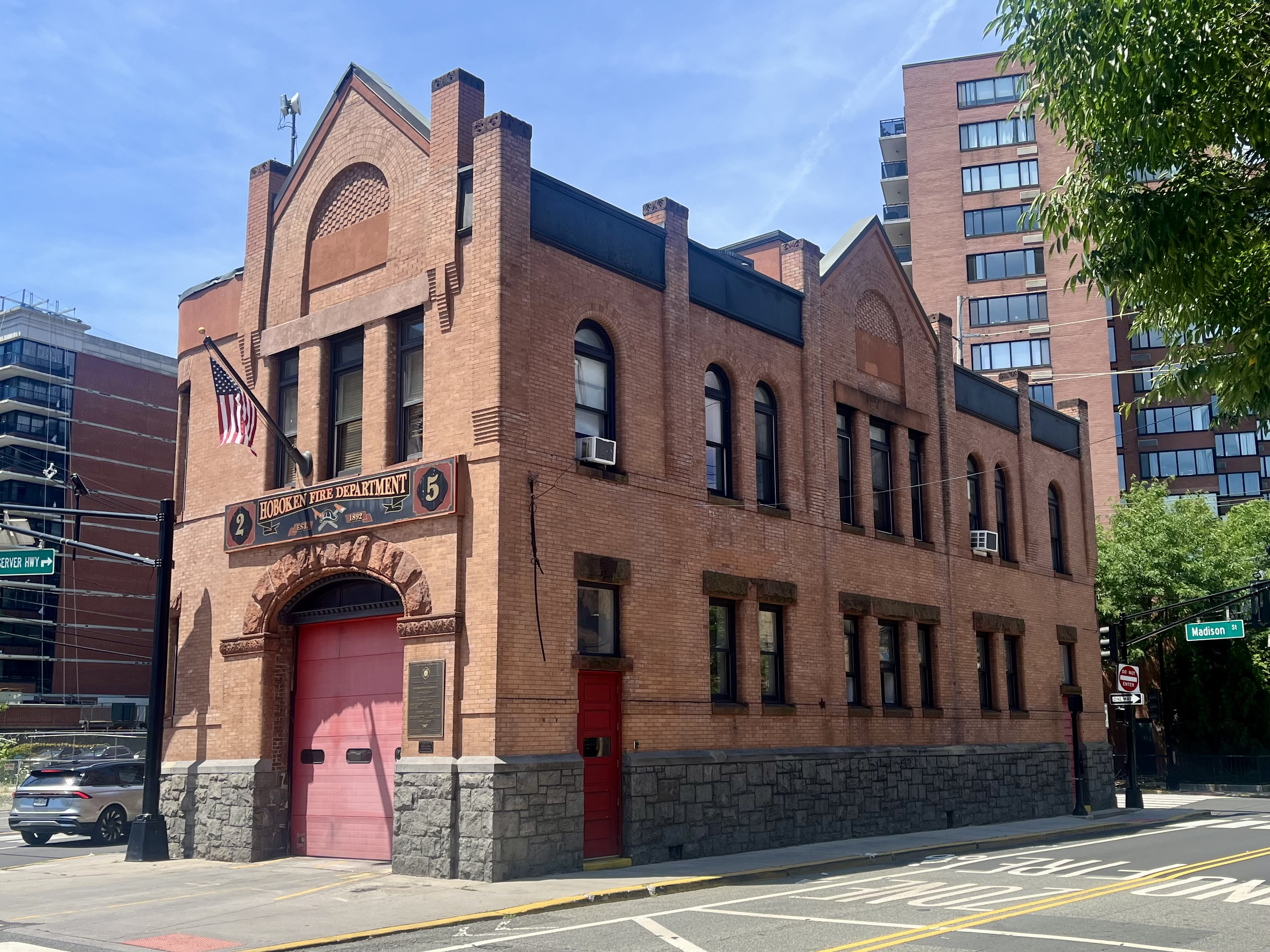
- The firehouse in 2026

- Location within Hudson County, New Jersey Location within New Jersey Location within the United States
- Location: 501 Observer Highway, Hoboken, New Jersey
- Area: 0.9 acres (0.36 ha)
- Built: 1892
- Architect: Charles Fall
- Architectural style: Romanesque, Romanesque Revival
- MPS: Hoboken Firehouses and Firemen's Monument TR
- NRHP reference No.: 84002700
- NJRHP No.: 1463

Significant dates
- Added to NRHP: March 30, 1984
- Designated NJRHP: February 9, 1984

Engine Company No. 3 is located in Hoboken, Hudson County, New Jersey, United States. The firehouse was designed by Charles Fall and was built in 1892. The firehouse was added to the National Register of Historic Places on March 30, 1984. The firehouse currently houses Engine Company 2 and Ladder Company 2 of the Hoboken Fire Department.

== Construction ==
The building is a two-story building with a fire watch tower designed by Hoboken Architect Charles Fall. The foundation of the building is field stone and the exterior walls are brick with sandstone trim. The roof is presumed to have been originally slate, however this has since been replaced. The masons were M. Foley & Son and the carpenter was A.W. Clayton.

== See also ==
- National Register of Historic Places listings in Hudson County, New Jersey
