= Jefferson Trust Company =

Historic building in New Jersey, United States

- U.S. National Register of Historic Places
- New Jersey Register of Historic Places
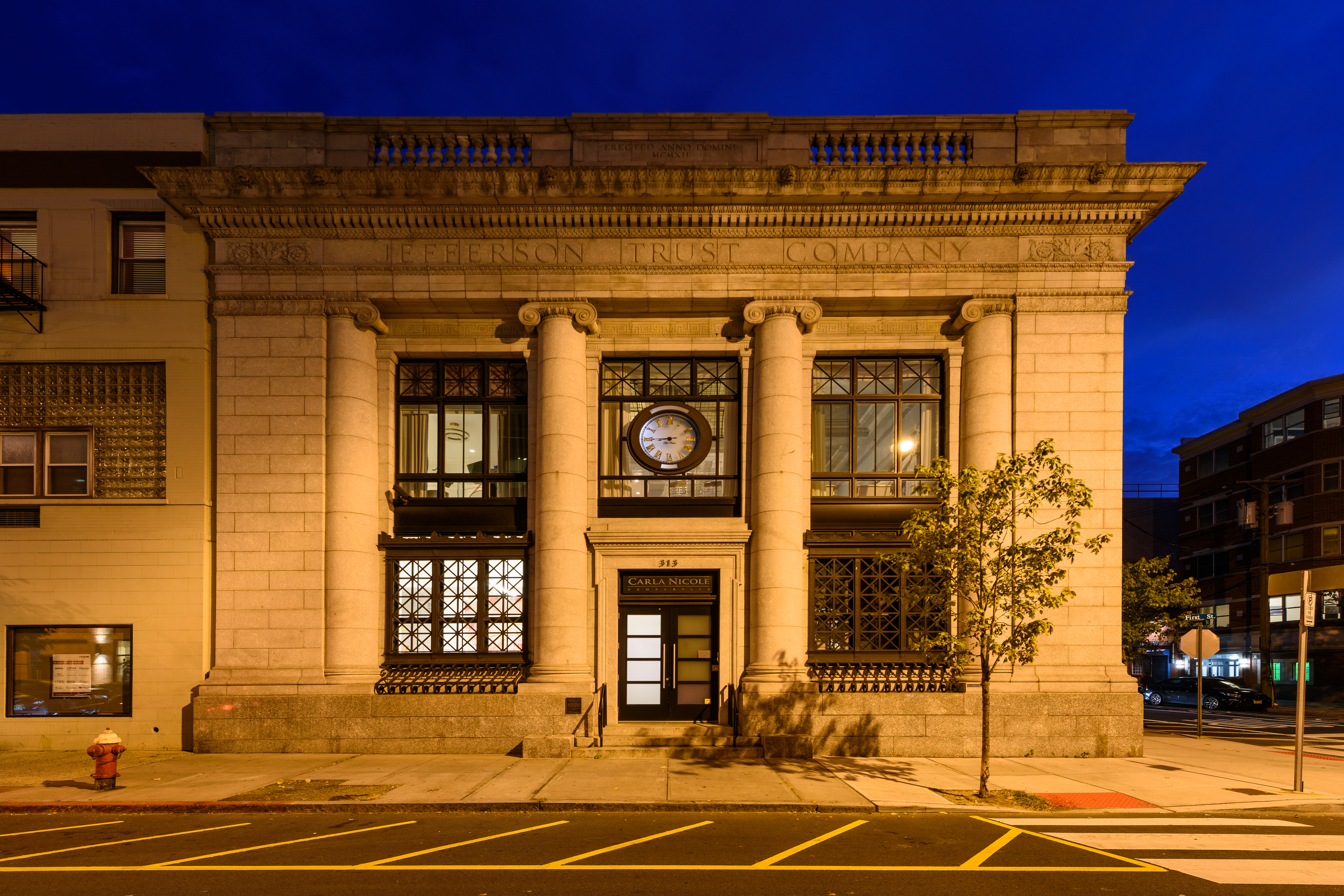
- Jefferson Trust Company in 2020

- Location within Hudson County, New Jersey Location within New Jersey Location within the United States
- Location: 313-315 First Street, Hoboken, New Jersey
- Coordinates: 40°44′17″N 74°2′7″W
- Area: 0.3 acres (0.12 ha)
- Built: 1912
- Architectural style: Classical Revival
- NRHP reference No.: 86000214
- NJRHP No.: 1471

Significant dates
- Added to NRHP: February 13, 1986
- Designated NJRHP: January 2, 1986

The Jefferson Trust Company is a historic building located in Hoboken, Hudson County, New Jersey, United States. The building was built in 1912 and was added to the National Register of Historic Places on February 13, 1986. The structure was constructed using granite and brick. Much of the original plaster interior remains intact. The building was restored in the early 1980s and underwent a renovation into luxury condos in the late 2000s.

== History ==
Plans for the construction of the new building at the corner of Clinton and First streets were announced by the Jefferson Trust Company in 1911. The decision to construct a new building was a result of the company's prosperity as it was outgrowing its prior quarters at 464 First Street. The building was expanded in 1920, and the addition of a rear annex and east wing more than doubled its size.

The original trust company failed during the Great Depression. The company was liquidated after failed attempts in rehabilitation. The building was acquired by the City of Hoboken in 1939 as a result of tax delinquency. During World War II, it was used by personnel from Todd Hoboken Shipyards. The city sold the property to the Union Engineering Company in 1946. The property was sold to the G&S Coat Company in 1962 and became a garment factory, after which it was passed on to a succession of owners and fell into disrepair.

The structure was restored in the early 1980s by the West Bank Construction Company, which reopened the building in November 1984 as the Jefferson Trust Renaissance Center, which included an auditorium, office space, and a sales office for the Jefferson Trust Condominiums being developed by the same firm behind the former bank building. The owners could have chosen to convert the Jefferson Trust Company building to condos, but wanted to give something back to the city.

The Hoboken Civic Theater was the first group to use the building's performance space located in the former lobby of the bank. The following year, the Hoboken Theater Company began using the space, which would hold up to 75 attendees. The building was proposed to be converted to a 600-seat theater in 1990, and fell mostly vacant by 2005.

The building underwent a renovation into luxury condos in the late 2000s. In April 2007, the developer initially proposed a gut rehabilitation of the building and the addition of new floors to result in a seven-story building containing 16 dwelling units. The proposal was subsequently cut back to contain 12 dwelling units with a variance to increase the building's permitted height from 40 to 46 feet (12 to 14 m). The final site plan was approved in February 2009 and construction began later that year. The 2,960-square-foot (275 m^{2}) penthouse apartment occupies two floors behind the building's restored clock and includes two bedrooms, two-and-a-half baths, and a 20-by-20-foot (6.1 by 6.1 m) stained glass skylight over the open living/dining area. The Issyra Gallery, an African art gallery, opened in the base of the renovated building in September 2012. The gallery was flooded by Hurricane Sandy just one month after it opened and reopened in July 2013.

== Architecture ==
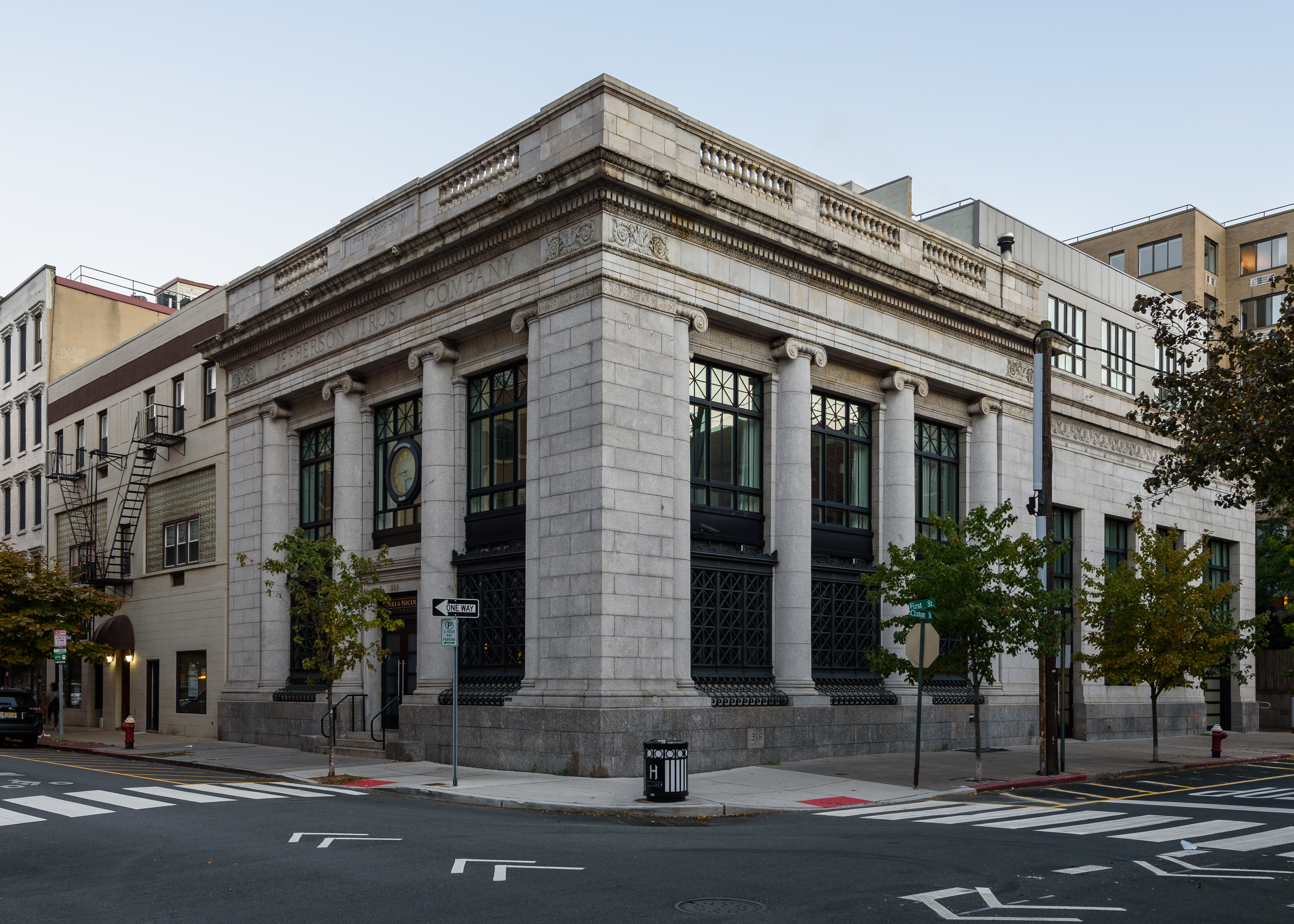
The building in 2020, showing condos extending above the rear addition

The Jefferson Trust Company building was designed in the Classical Revival style. The original structure occupies the corner of Clinton and First streets and has three bays of windows on each frontage, which are flanked by piers and Ionic columns that rise from the water table to an ornately detailed entablature. The entablature includes a denticulated cornice and a parapet with balusters above each of the window bays, except for the central bay on First Street, which is inscribed with the year of the building's construction. The First Street facade also has "Jefferson Trust Company" inscribed on the frieze. A clock is mounted in the center window on First Street, above what was the building's main entryway. The rear annex contains four bays of windows along Clinton Street and has a design that is complementary to the original structure.

== See also ==
- National Register of Historic Places listings in Hudson County, New Jersey
