= Hale-Whitney Mansion =

Historic house in New Jersey, United States

- U.S. National Register of Historic Places
- New Jersey Register of Historic Places
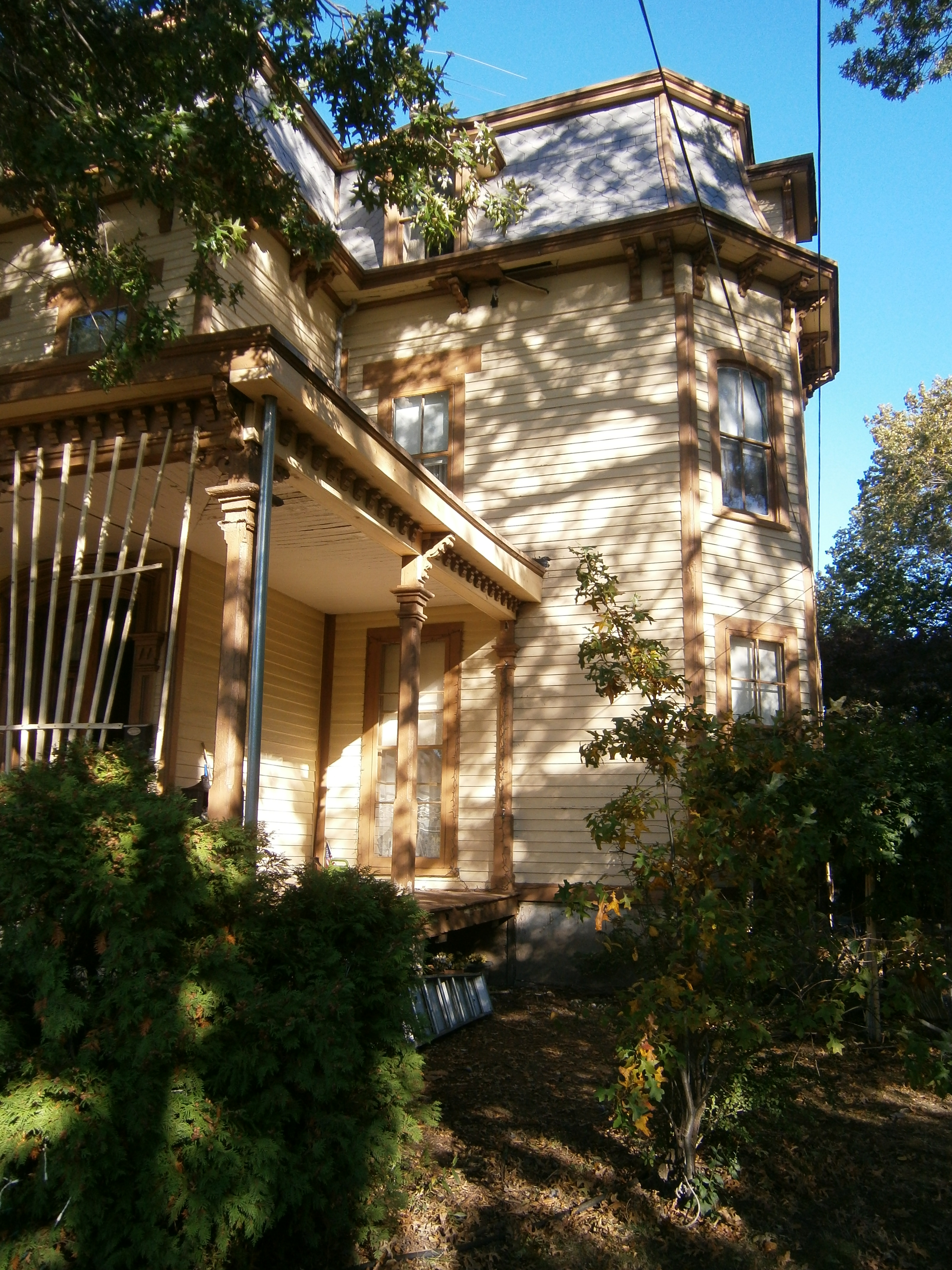

- Location within Hudson County, New Jersey Location within New Jersey Location within the United States
- Location: 100 Broadway; Bayonne, New Jersey
- Coordinates: 40°38′56″N 74°7′42″W
- Area: 0.4 acres (0.16 ha)
- Built: 1869
- Architectural style: Second Empire
- NRHP reference No.: 96000657
- NJRHP No.: 3177

Significant dates
- Added to NRHP: June 7, 1996
- Designated NJRHP: April 24, 1996

The Hale-Whitney Mansion, is located in Bayonne, Hudson County, New Jersey, United States. The building was built in 1869 and was added to the National Register of Historic Places on June 7, 1996. The building was considered to be exemplary of the Second Empire style of architecture, one of the few remaining unaltered structures in Bayonne.

== See also ==
- National Register of Historic Places listings in Hudson County, New Jersey
