= Engine Company No. 3 =

- U.S. National Register of Historic Places
- New Jersey Register of Historic Places
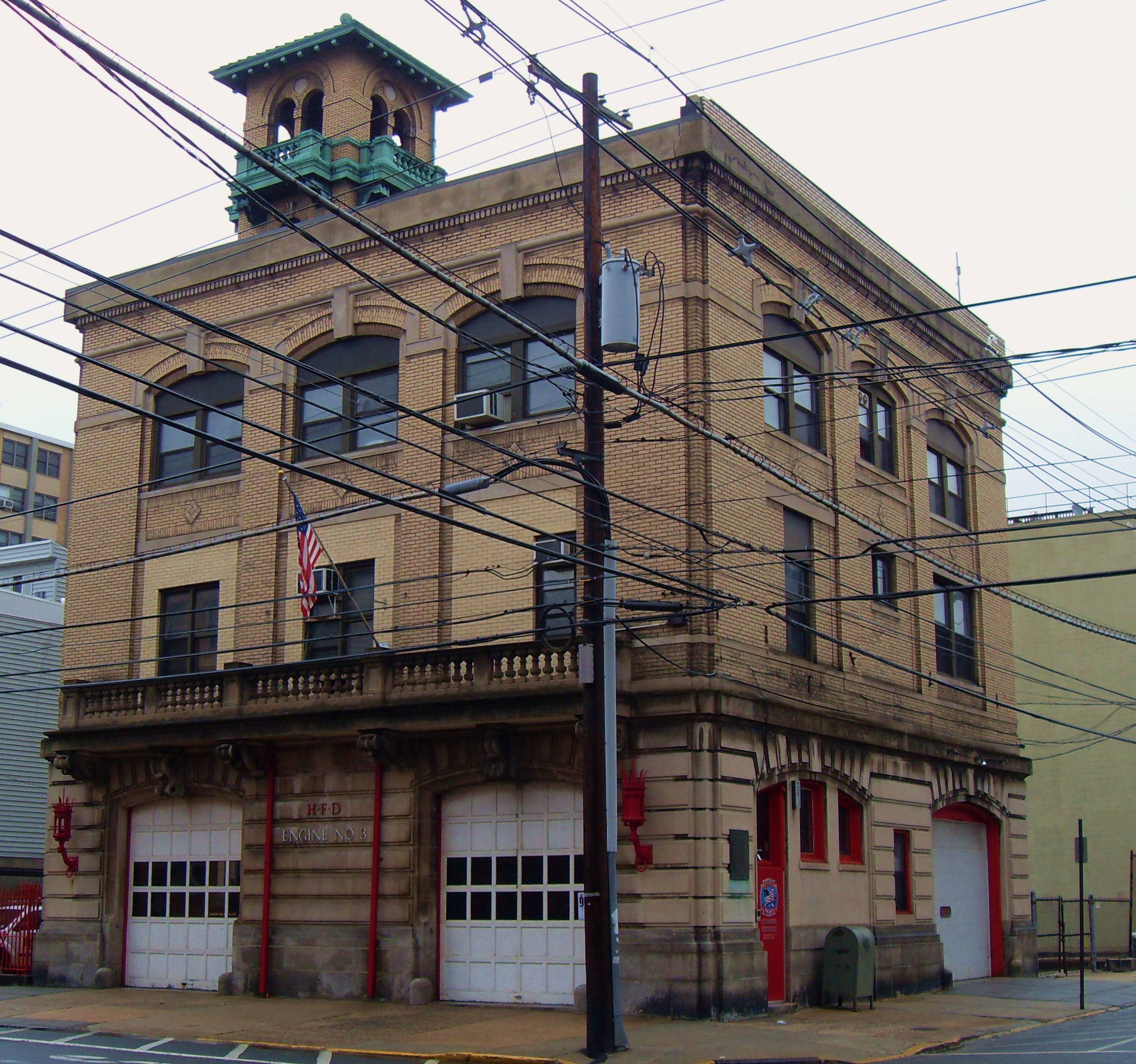

- Location within Hudson County, New Jersey
- Location: 201 Jefferson Street, Hoboken, New Jersey
- Coordinates: 40°44′24″N 74°02′15″W
- Area: 0.9 acres (0.36 ha)
- Built: 1915
- Architect: Fagan & Briscoe
- Architectural style: Italian Villa
- MPS: Hoboken Firehouses and Firemen's Monument TR
- NRHP reference No.: 84002687
- NJRHP No.: 1462

Significant dates
- Added to NRHP: March 30, 1984
- Designated NJRHP: February 9, 1984

Engine Company No. 3 is located in Hoboken, Hudson County, New Jersey, United States. The firehouse was designed by Fagan & Briscoe and was built in 1915. The firehouse was added to the National Register of Historic Places on March 30, 1984. The firehouse serves as the headquarters for the Hoboken Fire Department, but houses no fire companies.

== See also ==
- National Register of Historic Places listings in Hudson County, New Jersey
