= First Reformed Dutch Church of Bergen Neck =

Historic church in New Jersey, United States

- U.S. National Register of Historic Places
- New Jersey Register of Historic Places
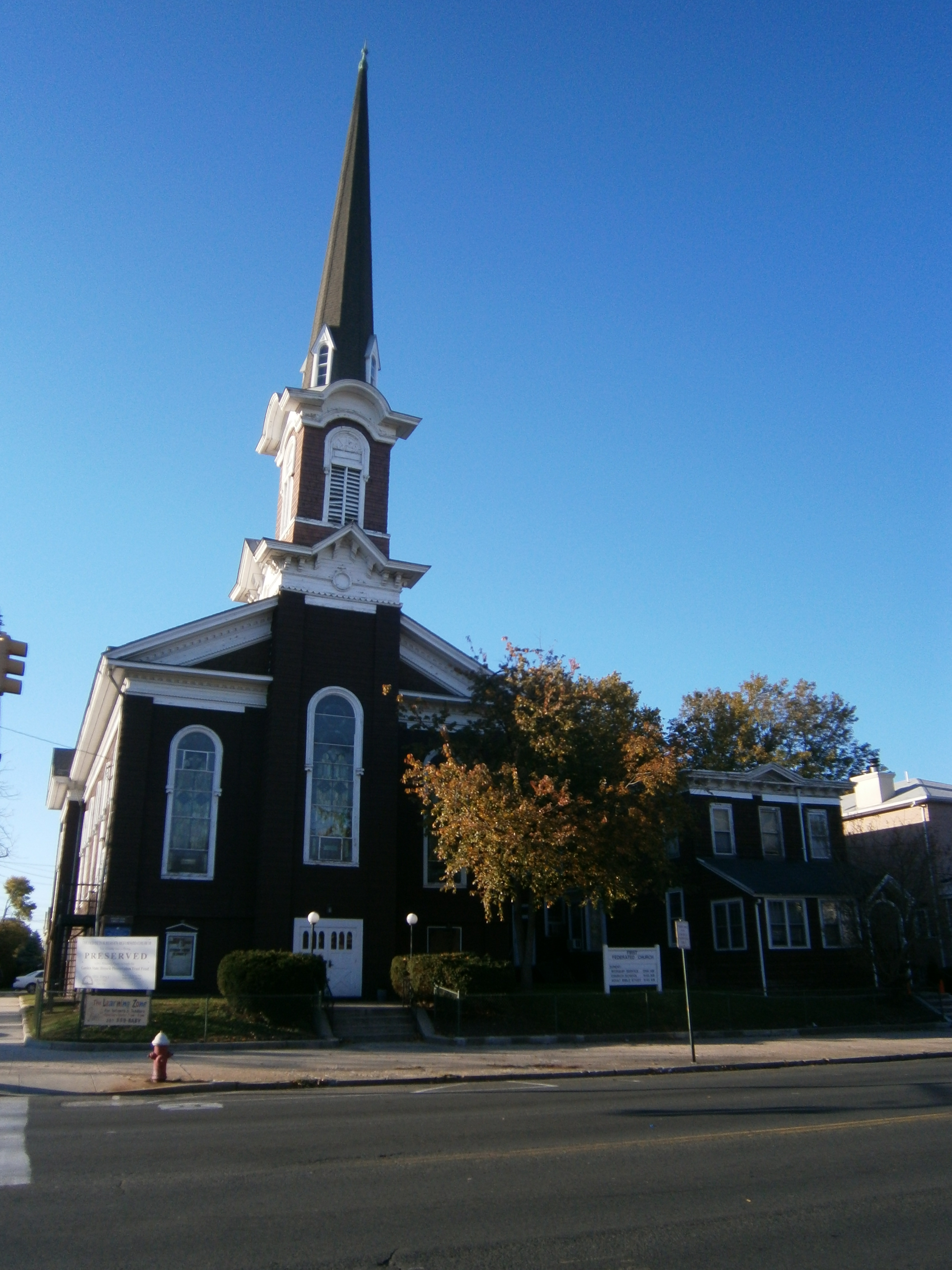

- Location within Hudson County, New Jersey Location within New Jersey Location within the United States
- Location: Avenue C and 33rd Street, Bayonne, New Jersey
- Coordinates: 40°40′25″N 74°6′52″W
- Area: 0.3 acres (0.12 ha)
- Built: 1866
- Architectural style: Italianate, Italianate vernacular
- NRHP reference No.: 82003274
- NJRHP No.: 1449

Significant dates
- Added to NRHP: April 22, 1982
- Designated NJRHP: October 23, 1981

The First Reformed Dutch Church of Bergen Neck, now known as The First Federated Church of Bayonne is located in Bayonne, Hudson County, New Jersey, United States. The church was added to the National Register of Historic Places on April 22, 1982.

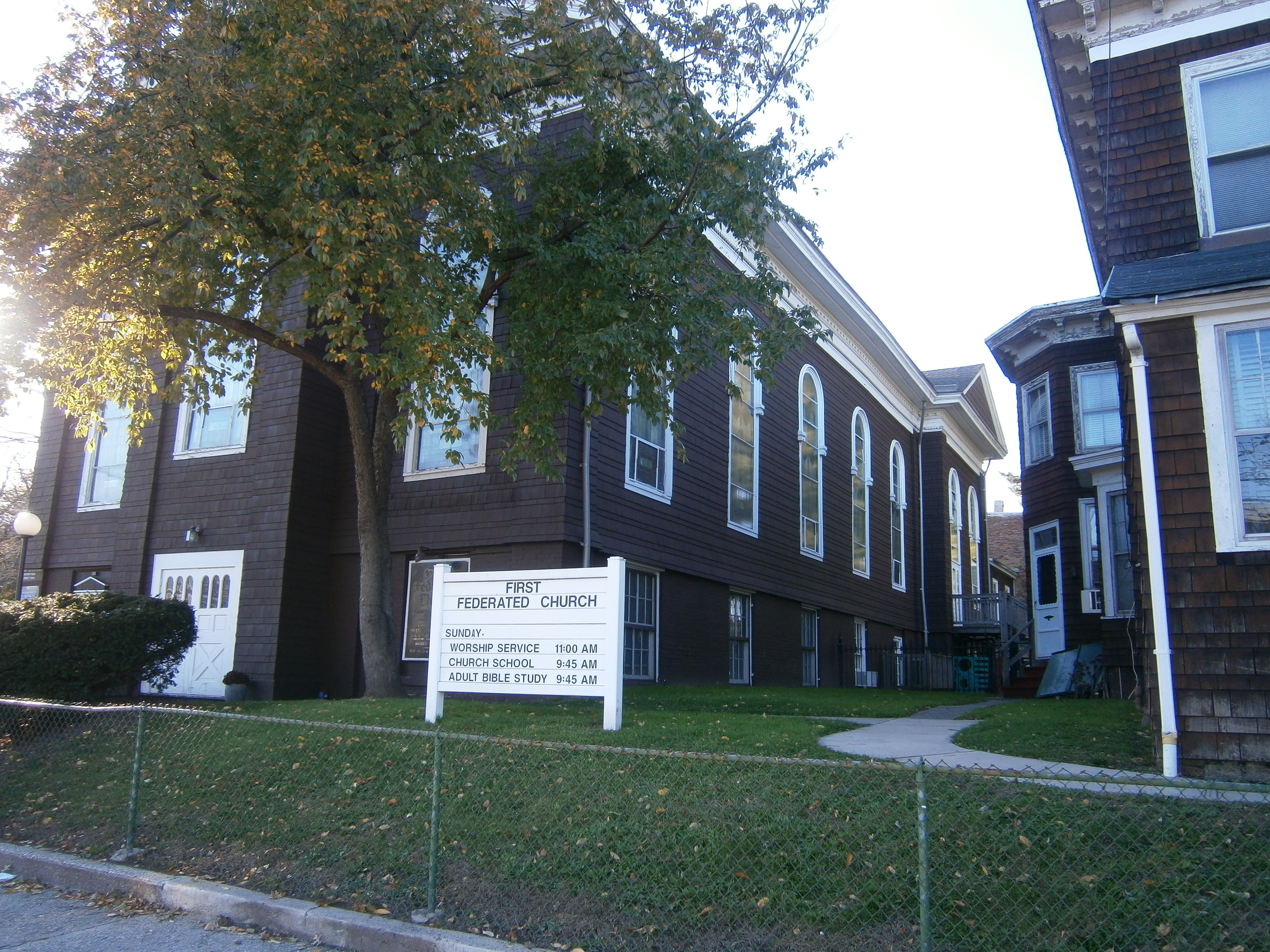

== History ==
The congregation was established in 1828 and the first church building dedicated on January 11, 1829. The current church was built in 1866 and enlarged in 1890. The building is an example of a bracketed, Italianate-influenced frame church.

== See also ==
- Bergen Neck
- National Register of Historic Places listings in Hudson County, New Jersey
- Old Bergen Church
