= First Baptist Church (Hoboken, New Jersey) =

Historic church in New Jersey, United States

- U.S. National Register of Historic Places
- New Jersey Register of Historic Places
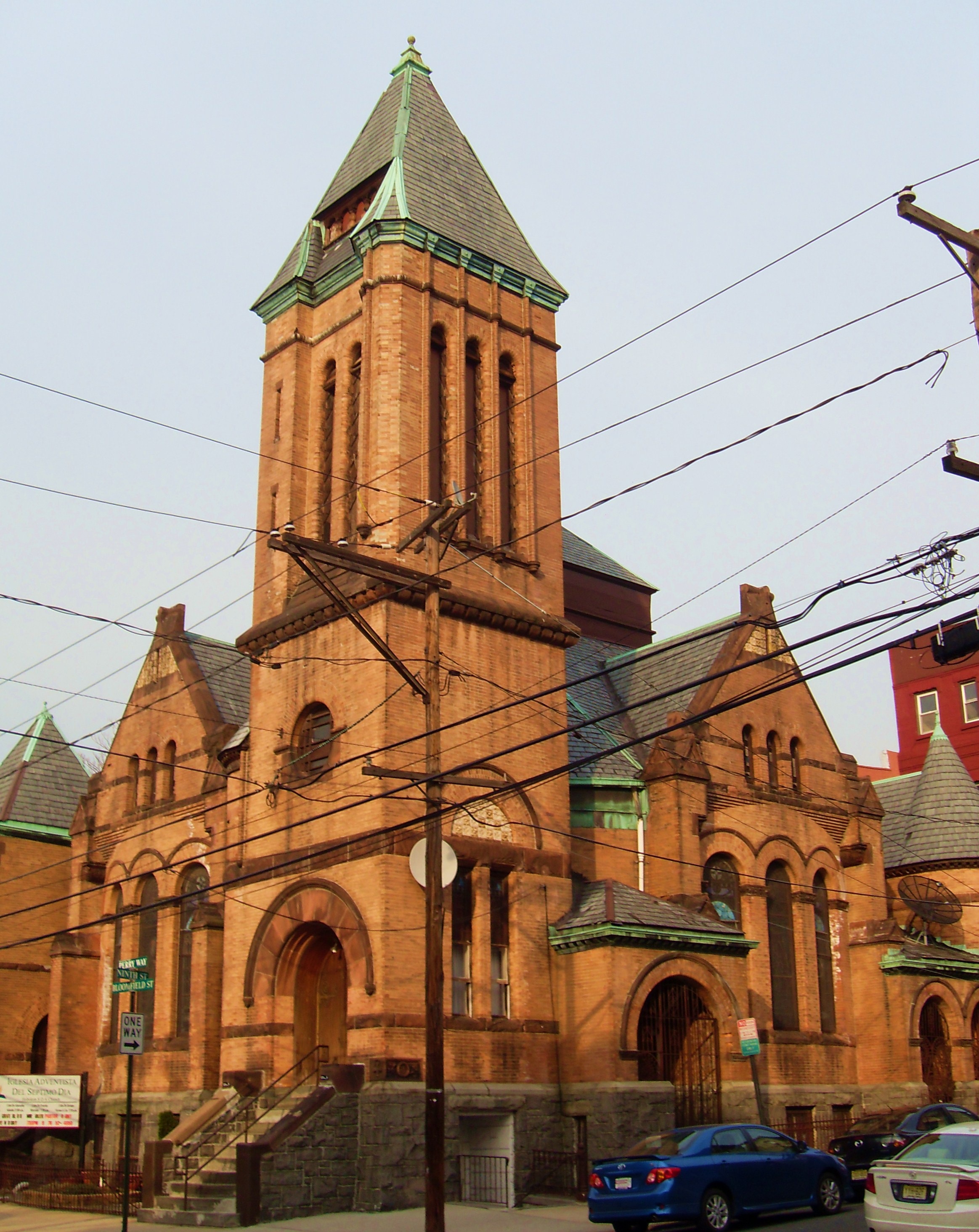

- Location within Hudson County, New Jersey Location within New Jersey Location within the United States
- Location: 901-907 Bloomfield Street, Hoboken, New Jersey
- Coordinates: 40°44′51″N 74°1′42″W
- Area: less than one acre
- Built: 1890
- Architect: French, Dixon & DeSaldern
- Architectural style: Romanesque
- NRHP reference No.: 05001570
- NJRHP No.: 4566

Significant dates
- Added to NRHP: February 1, 2006
- Designated NJRHP: July 26, 2005

First Baptist Church (Spanish Seventh-day Adventist Church) is a historic church at 901-907 Bloomfield Street in Hoboken, Hudson County, New Jersey, United States.

It was built in 1890 from a design by French, Dixon & DeSaldern of New York and added to the National Register in 2006.

The church closed in 2014, and in 2017 was being converted into condominiums.

== See also ==
- National Register of Historic Places listings in Hudson County, New Jersey
