= Engine Company No. 4 =

- U.S. National Register of Historic Places
- New Jersey Register of Historic Places
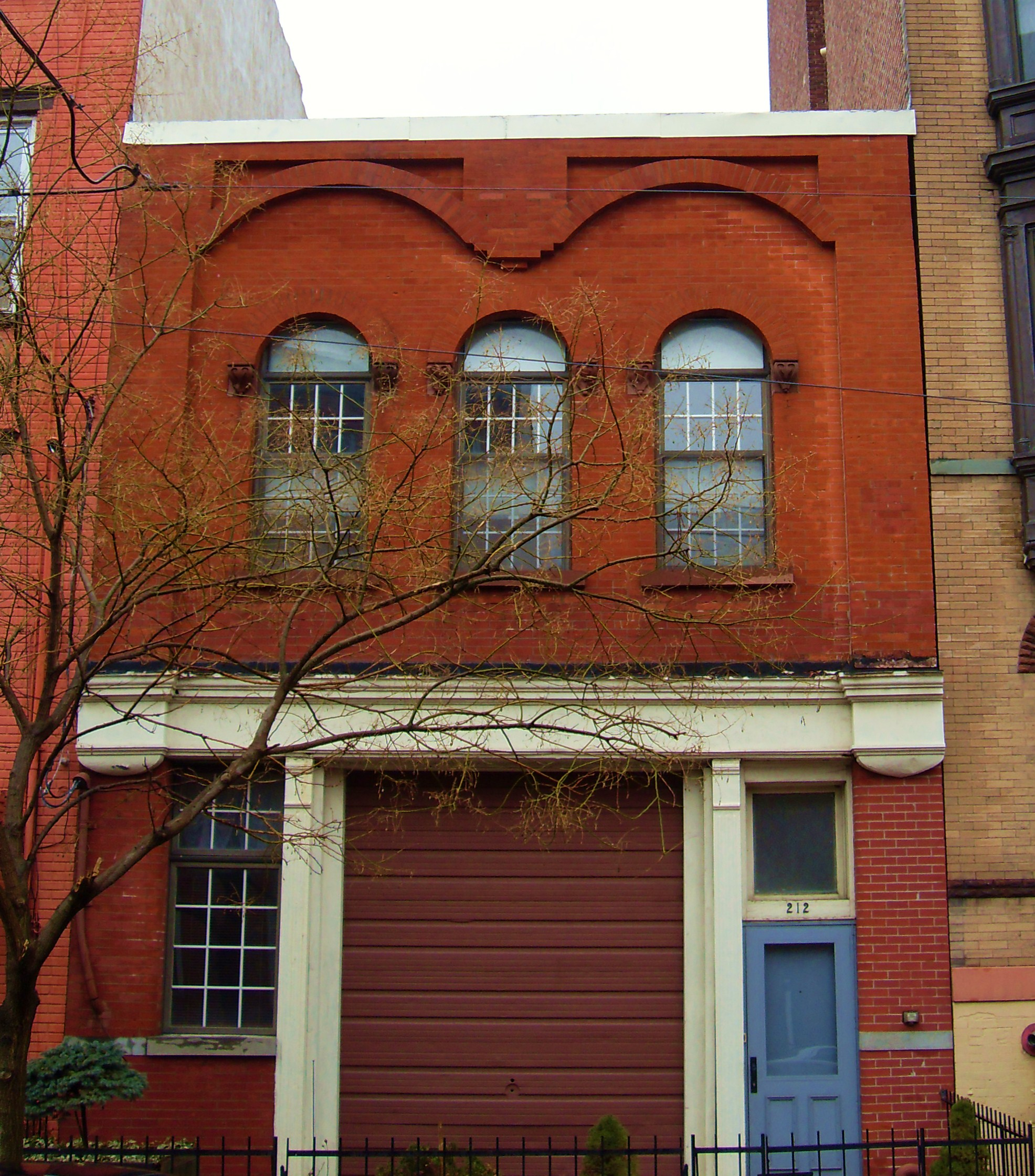

- Location within Hudson County, New Jersey Location within New Jersey Location within the United States
- Location: 212 Park Avenue, Hoboken, New Jersey
- Coordinates: 40°44′23″N 74°2′0″W
- Area: 0.9 acres (0.36 ha)
- Built: 1870
- Architect: Francis G. Himpler
- Architectural style: Italianate
- MPS: Hoboken Firehouses and Firemen's Monument TR
- NRHP reference No.: 84002691
- NJRHP No.: 1464

Significant dates
- Added to NRHP: March 30, 1984
- Designated NJRHP: February 9, 1984

Engine Company No. 4 is located in Hoboken, Hudson County, New Jersey, United States. The firehouse was designed by Francis G. Himpler and was built in 1870. The firehouse was added to the National Register of Historic Places on March 30, 1984.

== See also ==
- National Register of Historic Places listings in Hudson County, New Jersey
