= DHS Human Factors and Behavioral Sciences Division =

DHS Border and Maritime Security Division

Agency overview
- Formed: 2003
- Jurisdiction: United States
- Headquarters: DHS Nebraska Avenue Complex, Washington D.C.
- Agency executive: Christopher Turner, Director
- Parent agency: DHS Science and Technology Directorate
- Website: DHS Human Factors and Behavioral Sciences Division

The Human Factors and Behavioral Sciences Division (HFD) is a division of the Science and Technology Directorate of the United States Department of Homeland Security. Within the Homeland Security Advanced Research Projects Agency, HFD applies social and behavioral sciences to improve detection, analysis, and understanding and response to homeland security threats.

== Overview ==
The Department's 2007 High Priority Technical Needs Brochure defines critical focus areas for Human Factors research, falling primarily under the categories of "border security":

- Ability to non-intrusively determine the intent of subjects during questioning and "people screening":
  - Systematic collection and analysis of information related to understanding terrorist group intent to engage in violence
  - Non-invasive monitoring: Identifying and tracking unknown or potential threats from individuals at key checkpoints. Real-time detection of deception or hostile intent through integrated system of human and machine methods
  - Capability in real-time for positive verification of individual's identity utilizing multiple biometrics
  - Capability for secure, non-contact electronic credentials; contactless readers or remote interrogation technologies for electronic credentials
  - Mobile biometrics screening capabilities, to include hand-held, wireless, and secure devices
  - High-speed, high-fidelity ten-print capture capability
