= Half flux diameter =

The half flux diameter or HFD is a definition used by astronomers to define the star size in an astronomical image. Mainly due to the seeing, stars are not imaged as a dot but spread out like a Gaussian shape. The half flux diameter defines the diameter of a circle around the bright center in which half of the star flux or energy is contained. The other half of the flux is outside this circle. The half flux diameter unit is pixels.

The lower the half flux diameter value the better the seeing is and the sharper the image. It is a similar measurement to full width at half maximum (FWHM), but is a more robust measurement especially for stars out of focus. For a perfect Gaussian shaped star image, both the FWHM and half flux diameter values are theoretically $2\sqrt{2ln(2)}$ σ or 2.3548 σ.

The half flux diameter calculation is an approximate but fast routine, assuming that the half flux diameter line splits the star in equal portions of gravity.

Variables:

- Vi: brightness value of each pixel above the background, representing the star flux to that pixel
- di: distance from gravity centroid to each pixel.
- H: half flux radius (HFR). This is half of the half flux diameter.

The center of gravity is zero at H:

$$\sum_{i=1}^N V_i(d_i - H)=0$$

This can be rewritten as:

$$\sum_{i=1}^N V_i H=\sum_{i=1}^N V_i d_i$$

The H is then:

$$H= \frac{\sum_{i=1}^N V_i d_i}{\sum_{i=1}^N V_i}$$

HFD is linked to H by:

$HFD=2 H$

Since normally the number of pixels illuminated is small and the calculated star center of star is not at the center of a pixel, the above summation should be calculated on sub-pixel level or the image should be re-sampled to a higher resolution.

Using this approximate method, the half flux diameter of a perfect Gaussian shaped star, highly over sampled is 2.5066 σ. An offset of +6.4%.

== See also ==
- Gaussian function
