= National Register of Historic Places listings in Hudson County, New Jersey =

Location of Hudson County in New Jersey

List of the National Register of Historic Places listings in Hudson County, New Jersey

Contents: Counties and communities in New Jersey
Atlantic – Bergen (Closter, Franklin Lakes, Ridgewood, Saddle River, Wyckoff) – Burlington – Camden – Cape May – Cumberland – Essex – Gloucester – Hudson – Hunterdon – Mercer – Middlesex – Monmouth – Morris – Ocean – Passaic – Salem – Somerset – Sussex – Union – Warren

This is intended to be a complete list of properties and districts listed on the National Register of Historic Places in Hudson County, New Jersey. Latitude and longitude coordinates of the sites listed on this page may be displayed in an online map.

The steam yacht Kestrel, originally listed in Hudson, has subsequently been moved to Upstate New York, while the ferry Yankee, originally listed in New York City was moored in Hoboken for a time; it is now moored in Brooklyn.

This National Park Service list is complete through NPS recent listings posted May 15, 2026.

	Name on the Register	Image	Date listed	Location	City or town	Description
1	Association of Exempt Firemen Building	Association of Exempt Firemen Building	March 30, 1984 (#84002678)	213 Bloomfield St. 40°44′21″N 74°01′52″W	Hoboken	Hoboken Firefighters Museum; part of the Hoboken Firehouses and Firemen's Monument Thematic Resource (TR)
2	Dr. William Barrow Mansion	Dr. William Barrow Mansion	May 2, 1977 (#77000872)	83 Wayne St. 40°43′12″N 74°02′56″W	Jersey City	
3	Bayonne Truck House No. 1	Bayonne Truck House No. 1	January 2, 1976 (#76001155)	12 W. 47th St. 40°40′51″N 74°06′18″W	Bayonne	Bayonne Firefighters Museum
4	Bayonne Trust Company	Bayonne Trust Company	August 8, 2006 (#06000693)	229–231 Broadway; 40°39′25″N 74°07′35″W	Bayonne	Bayonne Community Museum
5	Buildings at 1200–1206 Washington Street	Buildings at 1200–1206 Washington Street	March 9, 1987 (#87000350)	1200–1206 Washington St. 40°44′57″N 74°01′38″W	Hoboken	
6	Church of Our Lady of Grace	Church of Our Lady of Grace	May 31, 1996 (#96000550)	400 Willow Ave. 40°44′32″N 74°02′03″W	Hoboken	
7	Church of the Holy Innocents	Church of the Holy Innocents	May 24, 1977 (#77000871)	Willow Ave. and 6th St. 40°44′38″N 74°02′01″W	Hoboken	
8	Clark Thread Company Historic District	Clark Thread Company Historic District	June 2, 1978 (#78001764)	900 Passaic Ave. 40°45′07″N 74°09′45″W	East Newark	
9	Engine Company No. 2	Engine Company No. 2	March 30, 1984 (#84002684)	1313 Washington St. 40°45′09″N 74°01′36″W	Hoboken	part of the Hoboken Firehouses and Firemen's Monument TR
10	Engine Company No. 3	Engine Company No. 3	March 30, 1984 (#84002687)	201 Jefferson St. 40°44′27″N 74°02′17″W	Hoboken	part of the Hoboken Firehouses and Firemen's Monument TR
11	Engine Company No. 4	Engine Company No. 4	March 30, 1984 (#84002691)	212 Park Ave. 40°44′23″N 74°02′01″W	Hoboken	part of the Hoboken Firehouses and Firemen's Monument TR
12	Engine Company No. 5	Engine Company No. 5	March 30, 1984 (#84002693)	412 Grand St. 40°44′33″N 74°02′10″W	Hoboken	part of the Hoboken Firehouses and Firemen's Monument TR
13	Engine Company No. 6	Engine Company No. 6	March 30, 1984 (#84002695)	801 Clinton St. 40°44′47″N 74°02′01″W	Hoboken	part of the Hoboken Firehouses and Firemen's Monument TR
14	Engine House No. 3, Truck No. 2	Engine House No. 3, Truck No. 2	March 30, 1984 (#84002700)	501 Observer Hwy. 40°44′11″N 74°02′26″W	Hoboken	part of the Hoboken Firehouses and Firemen's Monument TR
15	Erie-Lackawanna Railroad Terminal at Hoboken	Erie-Lackawanna Railroad Terminal at Hoboken	July 24, 1973 (#73001102)	On the Hudson River at the foot of Hudson Pl. 40°44′05″N 74°01′27″W	Hoboken	
16	Excelsior Engine Co. No. 2 Firehouse – Exempt Firemen Association Headquarters	Excelsior Engine Co. No. 2 Firehouse – Exempt Firemen Association Headquarters	August 12, 2022 (#100007991)	6106 Polk Street; 40°47′28″N 74°01′02″W	West New York	Exempt Firemen Association Headquarters
17	Fairmount Apartments	Fairmount Apartments	March 3, 1995 (#95000183)	2595 Kennedy Blvd. 40°43′30″N 74°04′27″W	Jersey City	
18	Ficken's Warehouse	Ficken's Warehouse	June 14, 1984 (#84002703)	750–766 Grand St. 40°42′55″N 74°04′12″W	Jersey City	
19	Firemen's Monument	Firemen's Monument	October 30, 1986 (#86003454)	Church Square Pk. 40°44′31″N 74°01′56″W	Hoboken	part of the Hoboken Firehouses and Firemen's Monument TR
20	First Baptist Church	First Baptist Church	February 1, 2006 (#05001570)	901–907 Bloomfield St. 40°44′58″N 74°01′43″W	Hoboken	
21	First Reformed Dutch Church of Bergen Neck	First Reformed Dutch Church of Bergen Neck	April 22, 1982 (#82003274)	Avenue C and 33rd St. 40°40′25″N 74°06′52″W	Bayonne	
22	Grace Church Van Vorst	Grace Church Van Vorst	August 1, 1979 (#79001492)	268 2nd St; 40°43′21″N 74°02′42″W	Jersey City	
23	Great Atlantic and Pacific Tea Company Warehouse	Great Atlantic and Pacific Tea Company Warehouse	June 2, 1978 (#78001766)	Provost Street between 1st and Bay Streets; 40°43′16″N 74°02′25″W	Jersey City	
24	Hackensack Water Company Complex	Hackensack Water Company Complex	January 3, 1980 (#80002491)	4100 Park Ave. 40°46′24″N 74°01′13″W	Weehawken	
25	Hale-Whitney Mansion	Hale-Whitney Mansion	June 7, 1996 (#96000657)	100 Broadway; 40°38′56″N 74°07′42″W	Bayonne	
26	Hamilton Park Historic District	Hamilton Park Historic District	January 25, 1979 (#79001493)	Roughly bounded by Brunswick, Grove, 6th, and 9th Sts. • Boundary increase (listed December 2, 1982, refnum 82001044): Jersey Ave. and 10th St. 40°43′35″N 74°02′45″W	Jersey City	
27	Harsimus Cove Historic District	Harsimus Cove Historic District	December 9, 1987 (#87002118)	Roughly bounded by Grove Dr., Bay & First Sts., Jersey Ave., Second, & Coles Sts. 40°43′24″N 74°02′41″W	Jersey City	
28	Highland Hose No. 4	Highland Hose No. 4	May 29, 1987 (#87000856)	72–74 Halstead St. 40°45′45″N 74°09′03″W	Kearny	
29	Hoboken City Hall	Hoboken City Hall	January 1, 1976 (#76001156)	86–98 Washington St. 40°44′14″N 74°01′55″W	Hoboken	
30	Hoboken Free Public Library and Manual Training School	Hoboken Free Public Library and Manual Training School	August 4, 2015 (#14000535)	500 Park Ave. 40°44′34″N 74°01′56″W	Hoboken	
31	Hoboken Land and Improvement Company Building	Hoboken Land and Improvement Company Building	July 3, 1979 (#79001491)	1 Newark St. 40°44′10″N 74°01′44″W	Hoboken	
32	Holland Tunnel	Holland Tunnel	November 4, 1993 (#93001619)	Connecting Lower Manhattan and Jersey City, running under the Hudson River; 40°43′42″N 74°01′37″W	Jersey City	
33	Hook and Ladder No. 3	Hook and Ladder No. 3	August 24, 2015 (#15000049)	218 Central Ave. 40°44′31″N 74°03′07″W	Jersey City	
34	Hudson and Manhattan Railroad Powerhouse	Hudson and Manhattan Railroad Powerhouse	November 23, 2001 (#01001256)	60–84 Bay St., 344–56 Washington Blvd. 40°43′14″N 74°02′10″W	Jersey City	
35	Hudson County Courthouse	Hudson County Courthouse	August 25, 1970 (#70000385)	Newark and Baldwin Aves. 40°43′53″N 74°03′29″W	Jersey City	
36	Jefferson Trust Company	Jefferson Trust Company	February 13, 1986 (#86000214)	313–315 First St. 40°44′15″N 74°02′09″W	Hoboken	
37	Jersey City Central Railroad Terminal	Jersey City Central Railroad Terminal	September 12, 1975 (#75001138)	U.S. 78 north of Ellis Island; 40°42′30″N 74°02′39″W	Jersey City	
38	Jersey City High School	Jersey City High School	June 1, 1982 (#82003275)	2 Palisade Ave. 40°43′48″N 74°03′16″W	Jersey City	
39	Jersey City Medical Center	Jersey City Medical Center	November 27, 1985 (#85003057)	Roughly bounded by Montgomery St., Cornelison Ave., Dupont St., Clifton Pl., and Baldwin Ave. 40°43′20″N 74°03′51″W	Jersey City	Renovation/restoration as residential/commercial mixed-use development, The Beacon
40	Jersey City YMCA	Jersey City YMCA	November 12, 1999 (#99001314)	654 Bergen Ave. 40°43′17″N 74°04′19″W	Jersey City	
41	Keuffel and Esser Manufacturing Complex	Keuffel and Esser Manufacturing Complex	September 12, 1985 (#85002183)	3rd, Grand & Adams St. 40°44′29″N 74°02′13″W	Hoboken	Now residences known as Clock Towers
42	Labor Bank Building	Labor Bank Building	June 14, 1984 (#84002705)	26 Journal Sq. 40°43′49″N 74°03′50″W	Jersey City	
43	Lembeck and Betz Eagle Brewing Company District	Lembeck and Betz Eagle Brewing Company District	June 21, 1984 (#84002707)	Bounded by 9th, 10th, Grove and Henderson StS. 40°43′42″N 74°02′29″W	Jersey City	The brewery buildings were demolished in 1997.
44	Loew's Jersey Theatre	Loew's Jersey Theatre	April 25, 2022 (#100007648)	54 Journal Sq. 40°43′56″N 74°03′52″W	Jersey City	
45	Monastery and Church of Saint Michael the Archangel	Monastery and Church of Saint Michael the Archangel	March 6, 1986 (#86000418)	2019 West St. 40°45′56″N 74°02′14″W	Union City	
46	Morris Canal	Morris Canal	October 1, 1974 (#74002228)	Irregular line beginning at Phillipsburg and ending at Jersey City; 40°42′45″N 74°02′17″W	Not applicable	
47	Morton Memorial Laboratory of Chemistry	Morton Memorial Laboratory of Chemistry	April 25, 2022 (#100007647)	6th and River Sts. (Stevens Institute of Technology); 40°44′35″N 74°01′37″W	Hoboken	
48	Old Bergen Church	Old Bergen Church	August 14, 1973 (#73001103)	Bergen and Highland Aves. 40°43′37″N 74°04′10″W	Jersey City	
49	Paulus Hook Historic District	Paulus Hook Historic District	June 21, 1982 (#82003276)	Greene, Washington, Grand, Sussex, Morris, Essex, Warren and York Sts. • Boundary increase (listed May 13, 1985, refnum 85002450): Roughly bounded by York, Green, Essex and Henderson; 40°42′55″N 74°02′21″W	Jersey City	
50	Pohlmann's Hall	Pohlmann's Hall	September 5, 1985 (#85002001)	154 Ogden Ave. 40°44′23″N 74°02′45″W	Jersey City	
51	Reservoir No. 3	Reservoir No. 3	August 27, 2012 (#12000569)	Bounded by Summit, Jefferson, Central & Reservoir Aves. 40°44′25″N 74°03′18″W	Jersey City	
52	Robbins Reef Light Station	Robbins Reef Light Station	July 19, 2006 (#06000631)	Southwest Upper New York Bay, 2.6 miles (4.2 km) southeast of I-78 Interchange 14A; 40°39′26″N 74°03′56″W	Bayonne	
53	Route 1 Extension	Route 1 Extension	August 12, 2005 (#05000880)	US 1 and 9 milepoint: 51.25-54.55, NJ 139 milepoint 0-1.45; 40°44′09″N 74°05′30″W	Jersey City and Kearny	Includes Pulaski Skyway. Also listed in Essex County section.
54	Saint Ann Roman Catholic Church and Rectory	Saint Ann Roman Catholic Church and Rectory	November 24, 2015 (#15000817)	704 Jefferson Street; 40°44′46″N 74°02′10″W	Hoboken	
55	St. Anthony of Padua Roman Catholic Church	St. Anthony of Padua Roman Catholic Church	March 22, 2004 (#04000225)	457 Monmouth St. 40°43′41″N 74°02′57″W	Jersey City	
56	St. Patrick's Parish and Buildings	St. Patrick's Parish and Buildings	September 17, 1980 (#80002489)	Grand St., Ocean and Bramhall Aves. 40°42′50″N 74°04′23″W	Jersey City	
57	St. Vincent de Paul Roman Catholic Church	St. Vincent de Paul Roman Catholic Church	August 24, 2011 (#11000590)	979 Ave. C 40°40′55″N 74°06′24″W	Bayonne	
58	Statue of Liberty National Monument, Ellis Island and Liberty Island	Statue of Liberty National Monument, Ellis Island and Liberty Island	October 15, 1966 (#66000058)	Upper New York Bay; 40°41′38″N 74°02′37″W	Jersey City	
59	Edwin A. Stevens Hall	Edwin A. Stevens Hall	February 4, 1994 (#94000009)	Fifth St. between Hudson and River Sts. 40°44′32″N 74°01′41″W	Hoboken	
60	United Synagogue of Hoboken	United Synagogue of Hoboken	June 27, 2008 (#08000563)	115–117 Park Ave; 40°44′17″N 74°02′01″W	Hoboken	
61	Van Vorst Park Historic District	Van Vorst Park Historic District	March 5, 1980 (#80002490)	Roughly bounded by Railroad Ave., Henderson, Grand, Bright, and Monmouth Sts. • Boundary increase (listed October 11, 1984, refnum 84000084): Roughly bounded by Railroad Ave., Henderson, Bright, Varick and Monmouth Sts. 40°43′07″N 74°02′50″W	Jersey City	
62	Van Wagenen House	Van Wagenen House	August 16, 2006 (#05000884)	298 Academy St. 40°43′49″N 74°03′58″W	Jersey City	
63	William Hall Walker Gymnasium	William Hall Walker Gymnasium	May 9, 2019 (#100003907)	6th St. at Fieldhouse Rd., Castle Point on Hudson; 40°44′35″N 74°01′35″W	Hoboken	
64	West Bergen-East Lincoln Park Historic District	West Bergen-East Lincoln Park Historic District	July 19, 2016 (#15000050)	Roughly bounded by Bergen, Harrison, West Side, Kensington & Fairmount Aves., Kennedy Blvd. & Montgomery St. 40°43′13″N 74°04′19″W	Jersey City	

== Former listing ==
	Name on the Register	Image	Date listed	Date removed	Location	City or town	Description
1	Seamen's Mission		July 25, 1978 (#78001765)	August 29, 1978	60–64 Hudson St.	Hoboken	Demolished on July 25, 1978, the same day that it was listed.

== See also ==
- National Register of Historic Places listings in New Jersey
- List of National Historic Landmarks in New Jersey
- Standard Oil Company No. 16 (harbor tug), located at Liberty State Park
