= Engine Company No. 2 =

- U.S. National Register of Historic Places
- New Jersey Register of Historic Places
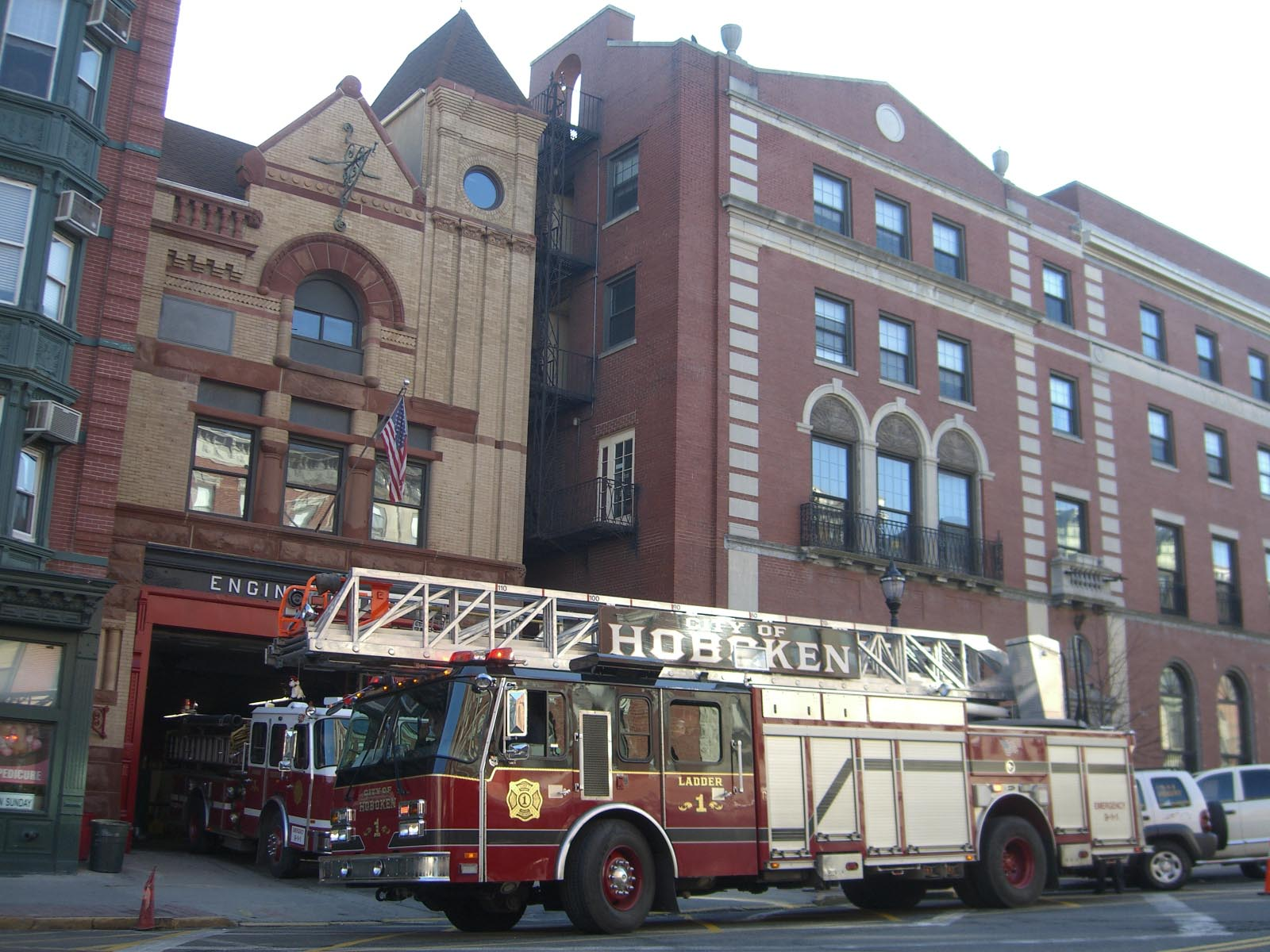
- Ladder Company No. 2 in 2010

- Location within Hudson County, New Jersey Location within New Jersey Location within the United States
- Location: 1313 Washington Street, Hoboken, New Jersey
- Coordinates: 40°45′10″N 74°1′34″W
- Area: 0.9 acres (0.36 ha)
- Built: 1890
- Architect: French, Dixon & DeSaldern
- Architectural style: Romanesque Revival
- MPS: Hoboken Firehouses and Firemen's Monument TR
- NRHP reference No.: 84002684
- NJRHP No.: 1461

Significant dates
- Added to NRHP: March 30, 1984
- Designated NJRHP: February 9, 1984

Engine Company No. 2 is a firehouse located at 1313 Washington Street in Hoboken, New Jersey, United States. The firehouse was added to the National Register of Historic Places on March 30, 1984.

== History ==
The Hoboken Land and Improvement Company donated a piece of land on July 18, 1889, for the construction a new firehouse, after the original built in 1880 was destroyed by fire in 1888. The firehouse was designed by French, Dixon & DeSaldern in the Romanesque Revival style and was built in 1890 by M.J. Connolly (Mason) and John Meighan (Carpenter). In the early 1970s, the engine door was widened resulting in the removal of one of the cast-iron pilasters and the glass directly above the original door. The "Engine Co. No. 2" letters are original to the building. The firehouse was restored outside and modernized inside after a severe fire occurred in the 1980s. The firehouse currently houses Engine Company 5 and Ladder Company 1 of the Hoboken Fire Department. According to local legend, the firehouse was built 12 feet back from the building line to protect pedestrians from the tobacco spit of firefighters.

== Design ==
The firehouse is a three-story example of Romanesque Revival style, with Richardsonian Romanesque influences. This was the first firehouse in Hoboken to incorporate a fire tower in the design of the building. The firehouse has a single chimney located on the northernmost wall. The main building material is tan stretcher bond brick. Bands of sandstone horizontally span the facade. The engine door has cast-iron pilasters on either side. A tower extends to four stories on the southern side of the building. The mansard roof and tower roof are covered in orange terra cotta-colored pantiles.

== See also ==
- National Register of Historic Places listings in Hudson County, New Jersey
