= Association of Exempt Firemen Building =

- Assembly of Exempt Firemen Building
- U.S. National Register of Historic Places
- New Jersey Register of Historic Places
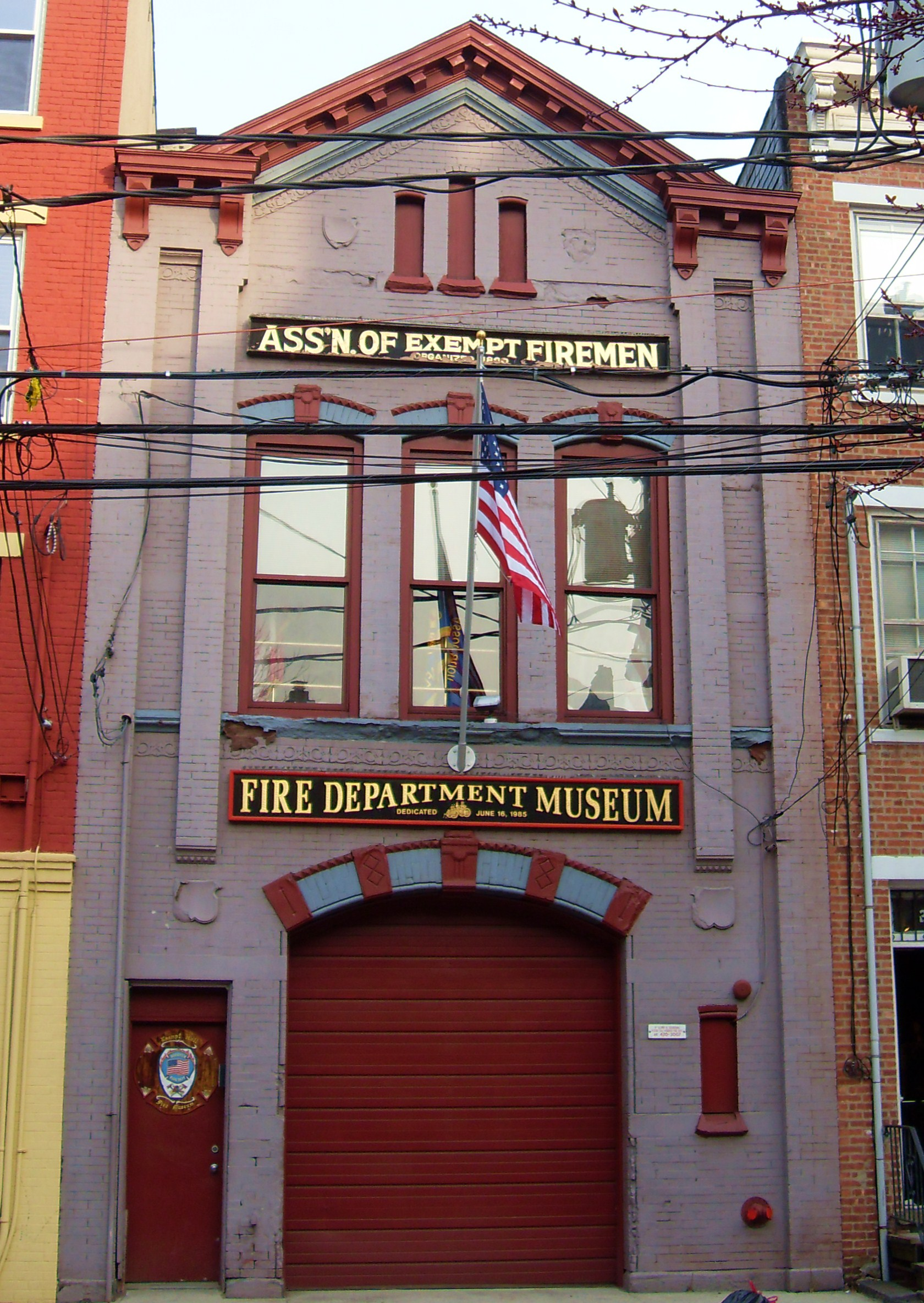
- Association of Exempt Firemen Building in 2010

- Location within Hudson County, New Jersey Location within New Jersey Location within the United States
- Location: 213 Bloomfield Street, Hoboken, New Jersey
- Coordinates: 40°44′21″N 74°01′52″W
- Area: less than one acre
- Built: 1870
- Architect: Francis G. Himpler
- Architectural style: Italianate
- MPS: Hoboken Firehouses and Firemen's Monument TR
- NRHP reference No.: 84002678
- NJRHP No.: 1459

Significant dates
- Added to NRHP: March 30, 1984
- Designated NJRHP: February 9, 1984

The Association of Exempt Firemen Building is located in Hoboken, Hudson County, New Jersey, United States. The building was designed by Francis G. Himpler and was built in 1870. The building was added to the National Register of Historic Places on March 30, 1984 as Assembly of Exempt Firemen Building. The building serves as a firefighters' union hall and as a museum of Hoboken firefighters' memorabilia, the Hoboken Fire Department Museum.

== See also ==
- National Register of Historic Places listings in Hudson County, New Jersey
- Exhibitions in Hudson County
