= Firemen's Monument (Hoboken, New Jersey) =

- Firemen’s Monument
- U.S. National Register of Historic Places
- New Jersey Register of Historic Places
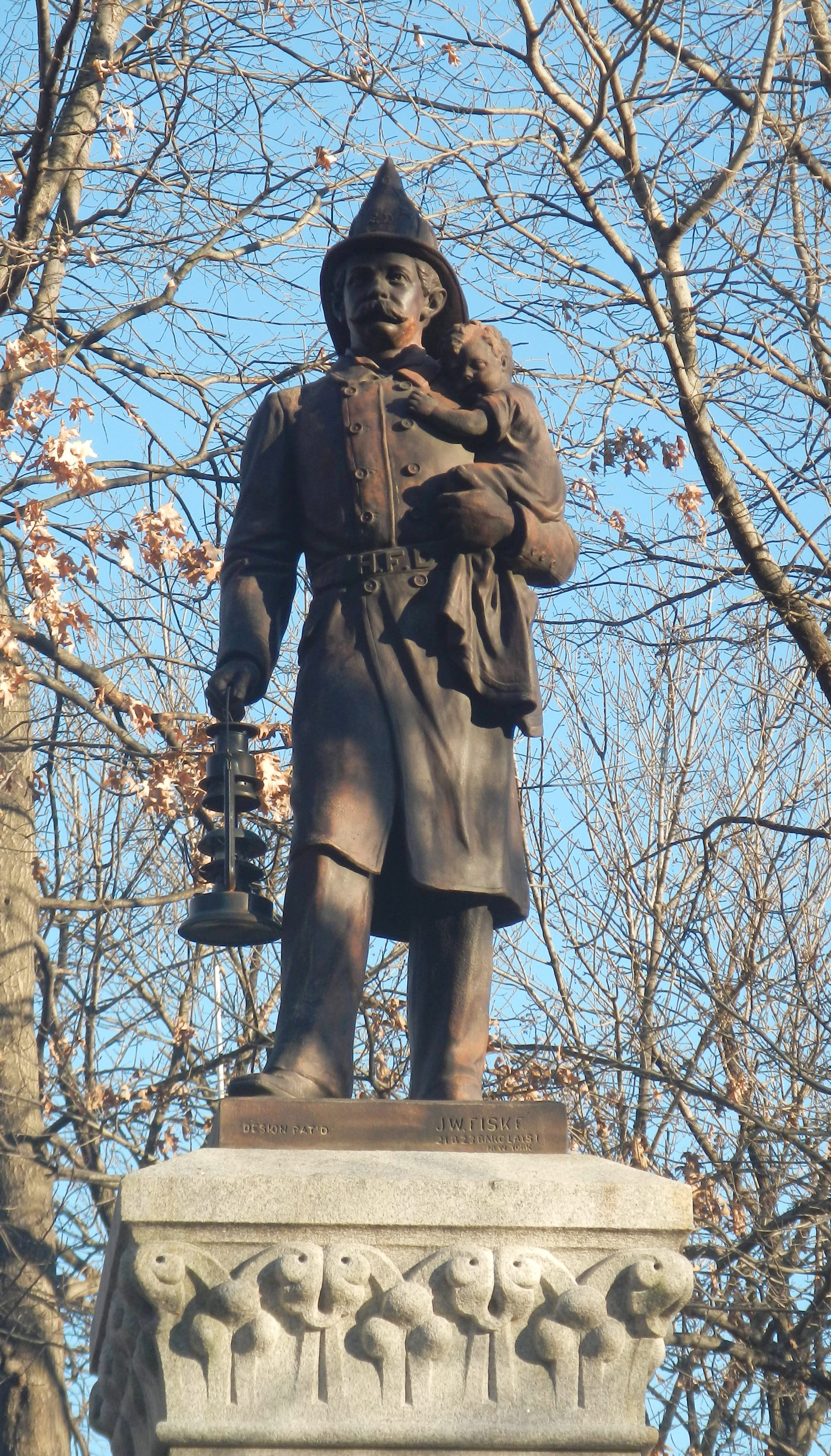
- In 2012

- Location within Hudson County, New Jersey Location within New Jersey Location within the United States
- Location: Church Square Park, Hoboken, New Jersey
- Coordinates: 40°44′32.2″N 74°1′58″W
- Area: less than one acre Social History, Art
- Built: 1891
- Architect: Caspar Buberl - Sculptor; J.W. Fiske - Caster
- MPS: Hoboken Firehouses and Firemen's Monument TR
- NRHP reference No.: 86003454
- NJRHP No.: 1468

Significant dates
- Added to NRHP: October 30, 1986
- Designated NJRHP: February 9, 1984

The Firemen's Monument is a 28 ft 0 in (8.53 m) tall monument in Hoboken, Hudson County, New Jersey, United States, that was designed by American sculptor Caspar Buberl and completed in 1891. The monument was built to commemorate the Volunteer Fire Department in Church Square Park on May 30, 1891.

== History ==
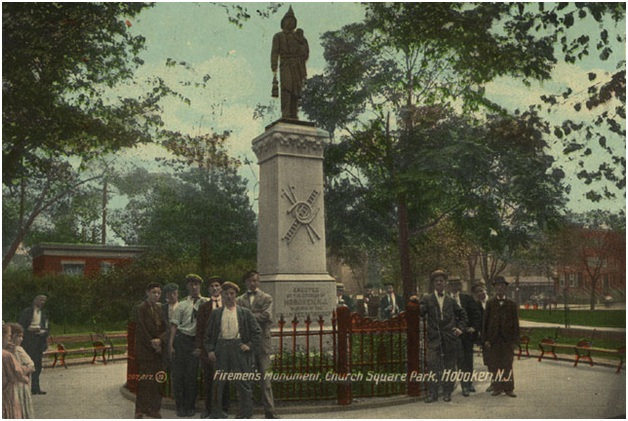
The Firemen's Monument in 1905

Starting in the 19th century, statues of firemen who died in the line of duty were placed in municipal burial plots, which eventually led to placement of monuments in more accessible public places and often to commemorate various departments or events. The monument in Hoboken was built to commemorate the end of the Volunteer firefighters in the city, as earlier that year, firefighting became a paid profession. The first statues were made using marble, but many, including the Firemen's monument in Hoboken, were sculpted using zinc and cast in bronze by Caspar Buberl and sold by J.W. Fiske.

== Monument ==
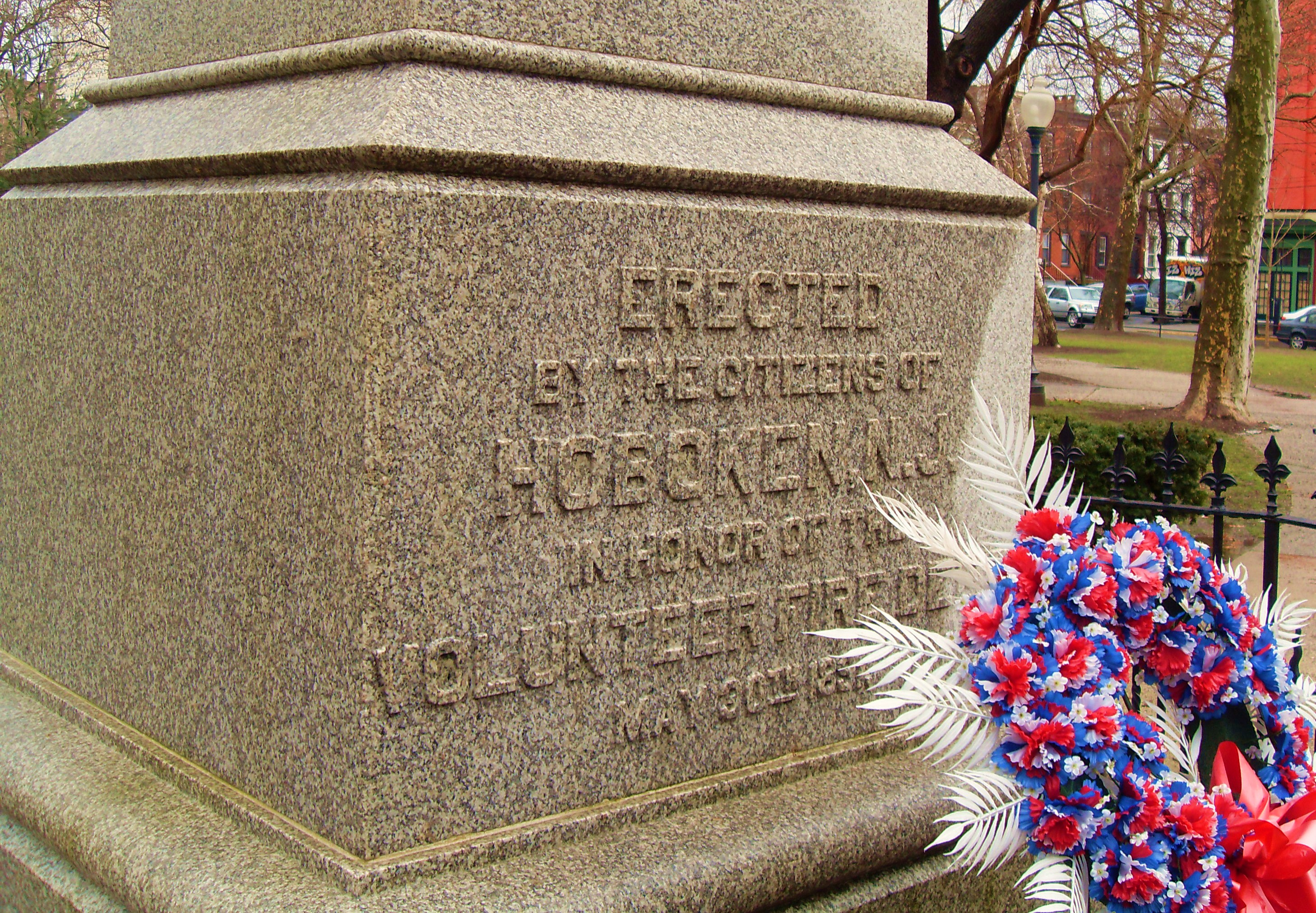
Inscription with memorial flowers

Standing in the west end of Church Square Park at Garden Street and 5th Street, the Firemen's Monument sits atop a 20-foot granite pedestal that features emblems of a ladder, pike poles and a fire hose on its face. The statue itself is approximately 8 feet tall and features a mustached firemen in uniform, holding a small child in nightdress in his left arm and a lantern in his right hand. Similar statues have been noted as being modeled after statues of the Virgin Mary cradling the baby Jesus. The monument reads:

Erected by the citizens of Hoboken, N.J. in honor of the volunteer fire dept. May 30th 1891.

== Legacy ==
With Hobokens' rich history and multiple National Register of Historic Places sites, a tour is run yearly and begins with the statue. Because of Hobokens vicinity and viewpoint to New Jerseyians during the September 11th attacks which resulted in the lives of many firefighters being lost, appreciation of these zinc statues has been renewed.

== See also ==
- List of firefighting monuments and memorials
- National Register of Historic Places listings in Hudson County, New Jersey
