= Engine Company No. 5 =

Coordinates: 40°44′34″N 74°2′7″W

- U.S. National Register of Historic Places
- New Jersey Register of Historic Places
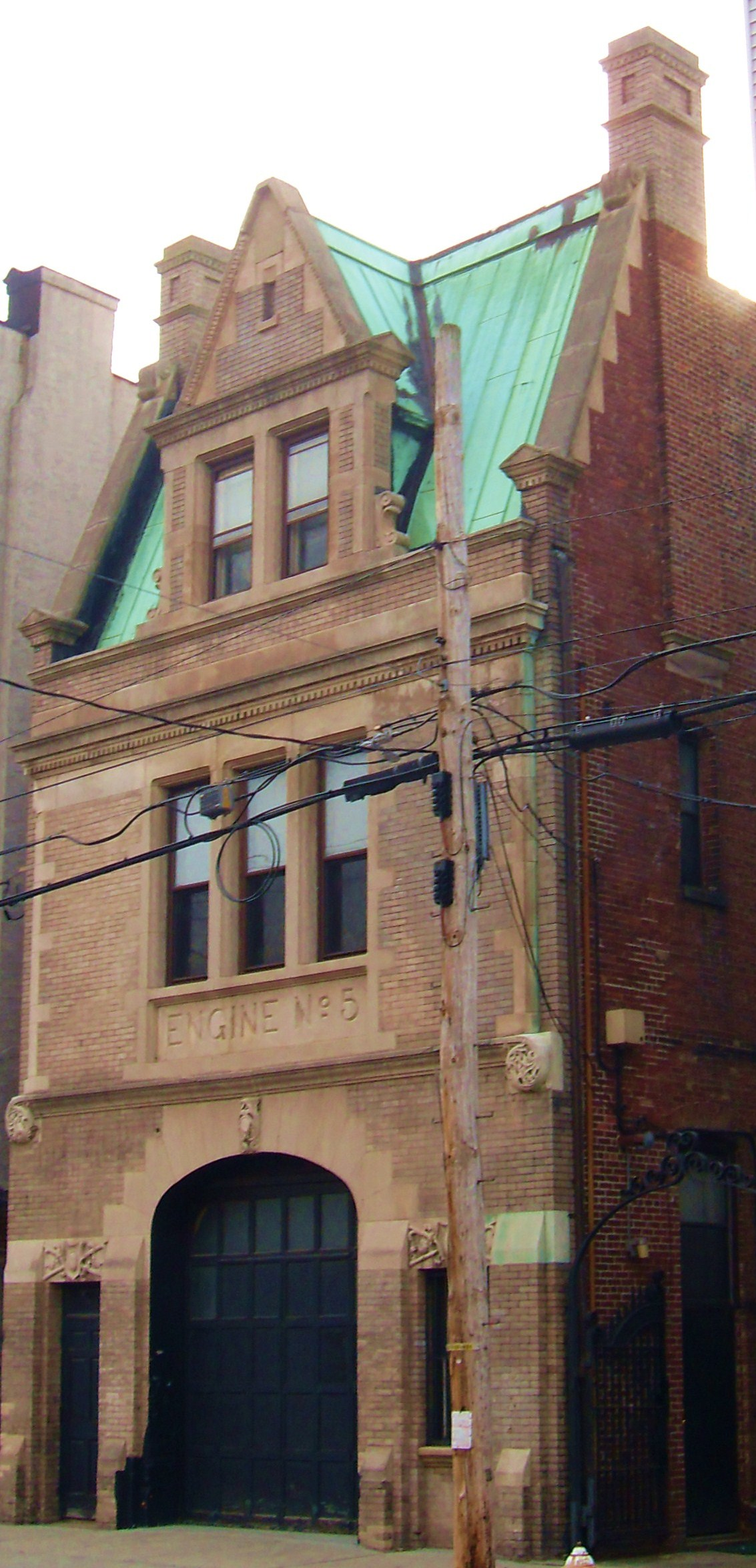

- Location within Hudson County, New Jersey Location within New Jersey Location within the United States
- Location: 412 Grand Street, Hoboken, New Jersey
- Area: 0.9 acres (0.36 ha)
- Built: 1898
- Architect: Fall & Maxson
- Architectural style: Francis I
- MPS: Hoboken Firehouses and Firemen's Monument TR
- NRHP reference No.: 84002693
- NJRHP No.: 1465

Significant dates
- Added to NRHP: March 30, 1984
- Designated NJRHP: February 9, 1984

Engine Company No. 5 is located in Hoboken, Hudson County, New Jersey, United States. The firehouse was designed by Fall & Maxson and was built in 1898. The firehouse was added to the National Register of Historic Places on March 30, 1984.

== See also ==
- National Register of Historic Places listings in Hudson County, New Jersey
