= Jersey City Fire Department =

Fire protection service in Jersey City, New Jersey

Operational area
- Country: United States
- State: New Jersey
- City: Jersey City

Agency overview
- Established: September 21, 1829
- Annual calls: 26,734 (2013)
- Employees: 676 (2023)
- Annual budget: $67,120,543 (2014)
- Staffing: Career
- Fire chief: John F. Johnson
- IAFF: 1066/1064

Facilities and equipment
- Battalions: 4
- Stations: 15
- Engines: 16
- Trucks: 6
- Tillers: 1
- Platforms: 2
- Squads: 2 (1 rescue pumper, 1 Roll rig)
- Rescues: 1
- Tenders: 1
- HAZMAT: 2
- USAR: 1
- Fireboats: 2
- Rescue boats: 1
- Light and air: 1

Website
- Official website
- IAFF website

The Jersey City Fire Department is the largest in the state of New Jersey and provides fire protection and hazardous materials services to the city of Jersey City. In all, the department is responsible for 21 square miles (54 km^{2}) with a population of 261,940 residents, which makes it the second largest city in New Jersey, behind Newark.

The department is part of the Metro USAR Strike Team, which consists of nine North Jersey fire departments and other emergency services divisions working to address major emergency rescue situations.

== History ==
The department got its start in the spring of 1829 after several fires occurred in the city and the public demanded fire protection. Thirty citizens signed up and on September 21, 1829, the Liberty Engine Company No. 1 was established.

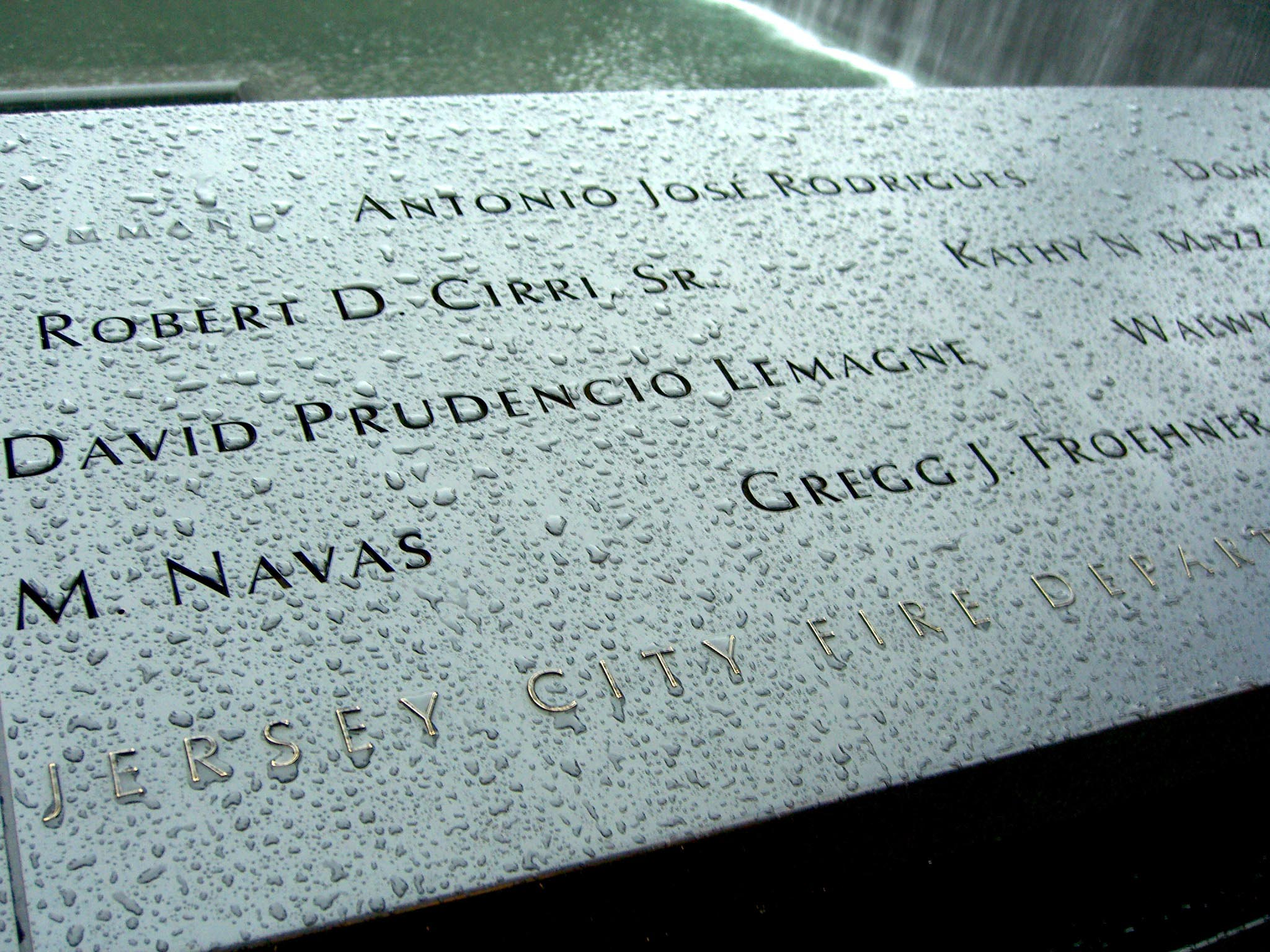
Panel S-29 on the South Pool of the 9/11 Museum pays tribute to the JCFD.

Jersey City's fire department was the only New Jersey department to receive an official call for assistance during the September 11 attacks, with hundreds of department personnel assisting in the Ground Zero cleanup effort. Among the first responders who perished on that day was Fire Department of Jersey City dispatcher Joseph Lovero, who was hit by a piece of debris. The Fire Department of Jersey City named its fireboat after him.

== Stations and apparatus ==
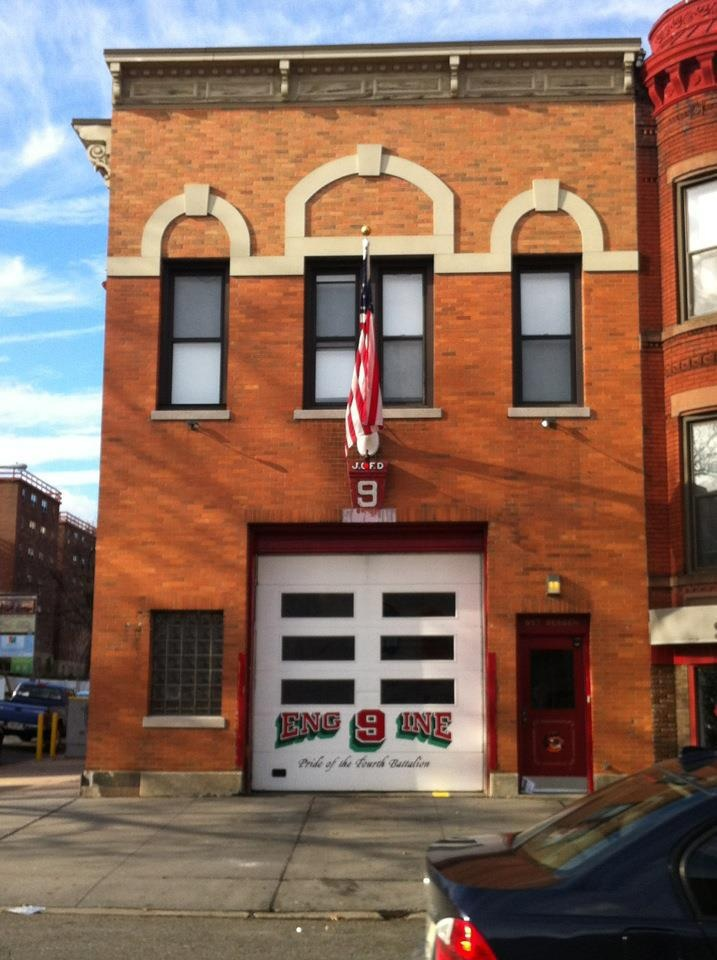
The quarters of JCFD Engine 9 on Bergen Ave.

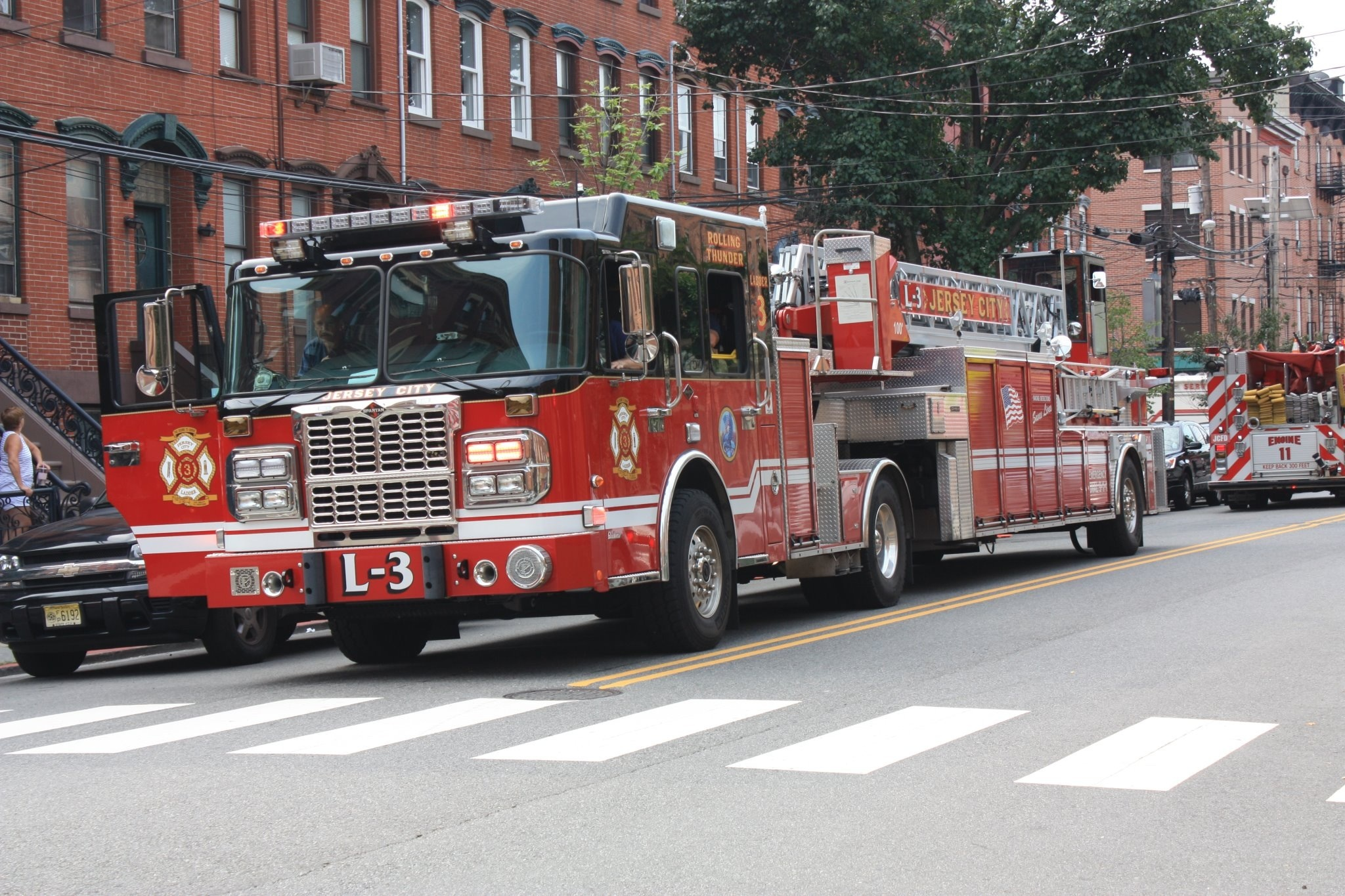
JCFD Ladder 3

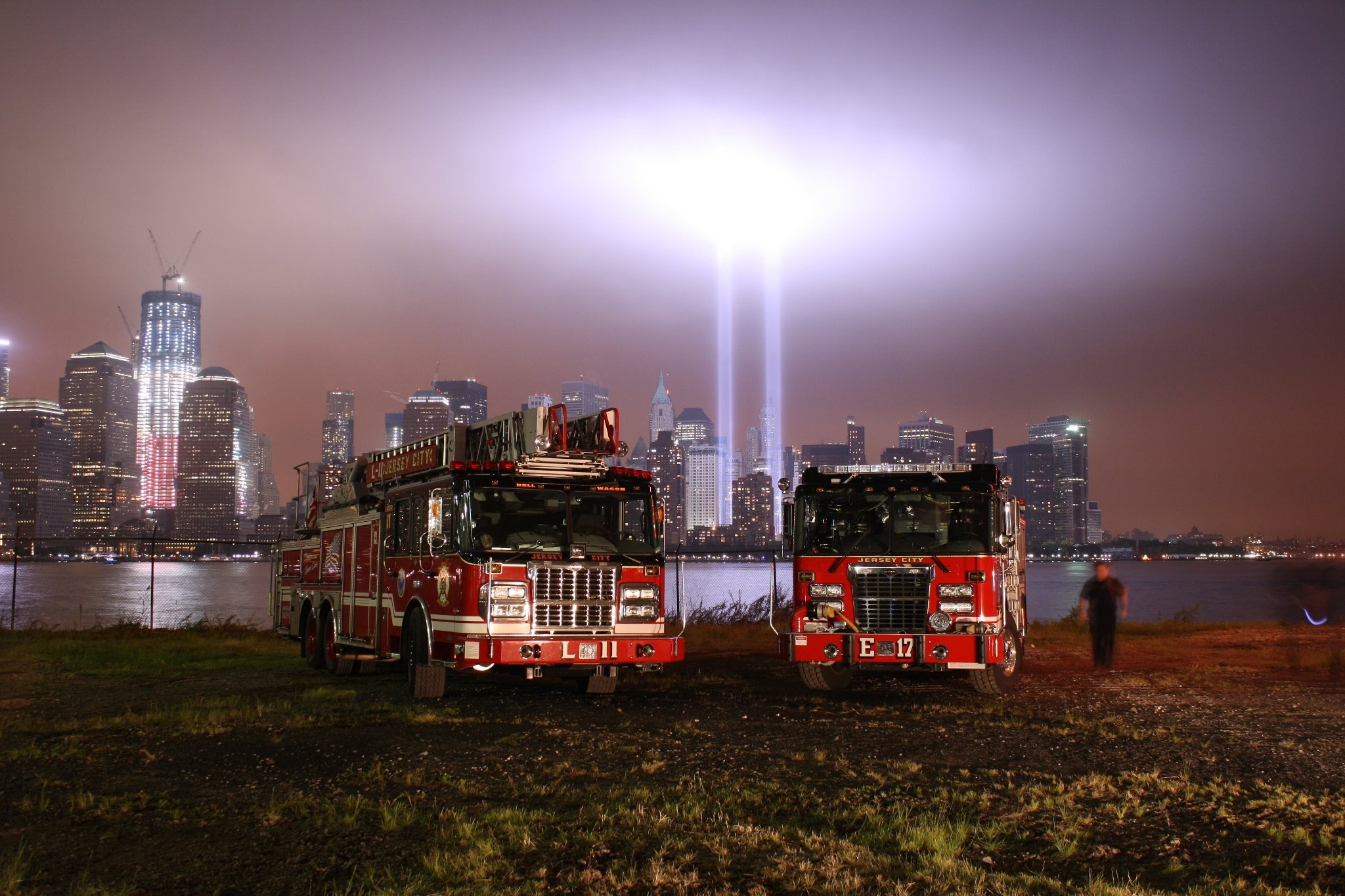
JCFD Ladder 11 & Engine 17

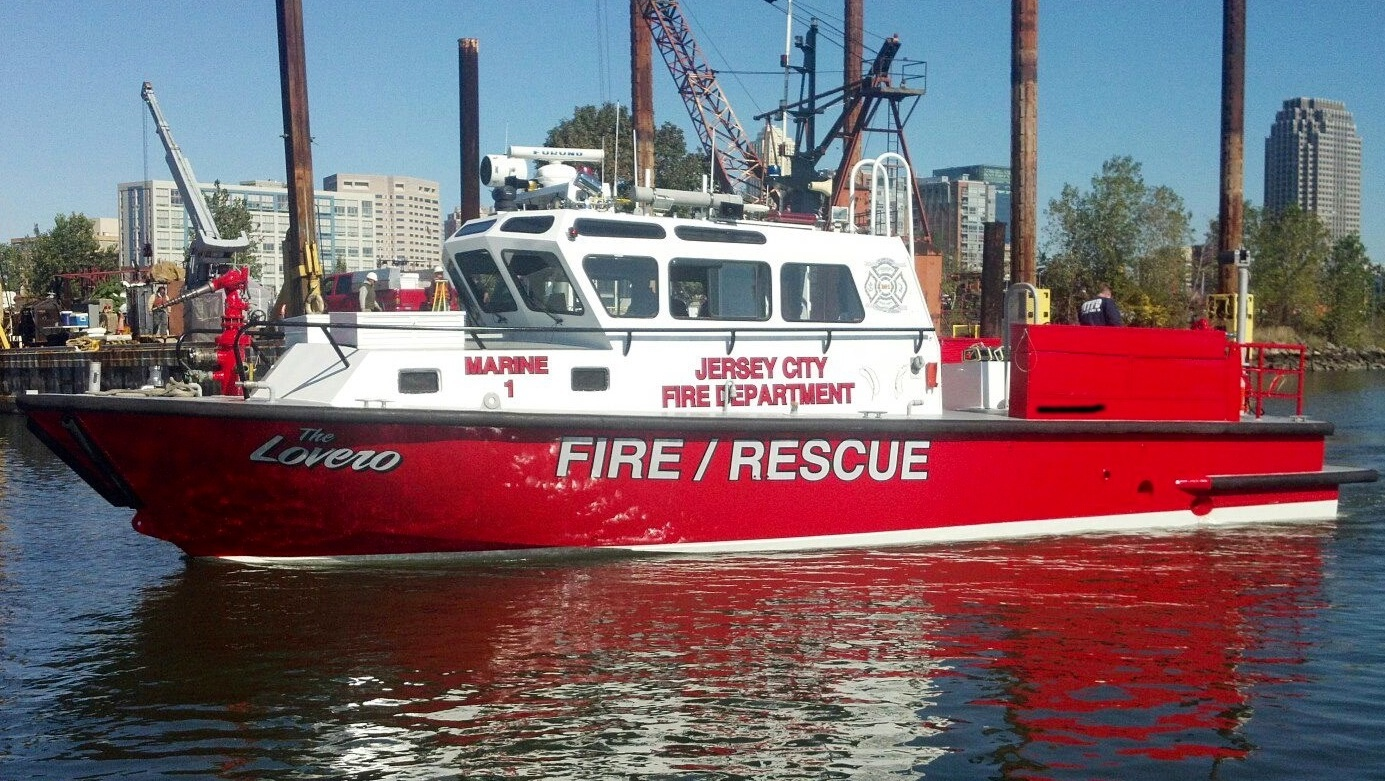
JCFD Marine 1 The Lovero

| Engine Company | Ladder Company | Specialized Unit | Chief Unit | Battalion | Address | Neighborhood |
|---|---|---|---|---|---|---|
| Engine 2 | | | | 1 | 160 Grand St. | Paulus Hook |
| Engine 5, Engine 1 | Ladder 2 | Hazmat Decon Unit | Battalion Chief 1 | 1 | 355 Newark Ave. | The Village |
| Engine 6 | Ladder Tower 6 | Squad 1 (RIC Unit) | Deputy Chief 1 | 1 | 465 Marin Blvd. | Downtown |
| Engine 7, Engine 18 | Ladder 3 (Tiller) | Marine Land Unit | Battalion Chief 3 | 3 | 715 Summit Ave. | Jersey City Heights |
| Engine 8 | | Foam Unit 1, Quick Attack Response Vehicle 1(QRV) | | 2 | 14–16 Orient Ave. | West Bergen |
| Engine 9 | | | Battalion Chief 4 | 4 | 697 Bergen Ave. | McGinley Square |
| | | Squad 4 (rescue-pumper); Rescue 1 | | 4 | 582 Communipaw Ave. | Bergen-Lafayette |
| Engine 11 | | High-Rise/Tunnel Unit | | 3 | 152 Lincoln St. | Western Slope |
| Engine 13 | | | | 2 | 152 Linden Ave. | Greenville |
| Engine 14 | Ladder 7 | Haz-Mat. Unit 1, Haz-Mat. Unit 2 | | 3 | 595 Palisade Ave. | Jersey City Heights |
| Engine 15 | Ladder 9 | | | 4 | 200 Sip Ave. | Journal Square |
| Engine 17 | Ladder 11 | Mask Service Unit(Air Cascade), Medical Ambulance Bus 3 | Field Training/Safety Officer | 4 | 255 Kearney Ave. | West Side |
| Engine 19 | Ladder 8 | | Battalion Chief 2 | 2 | 2 Bergen Ave. | Greenville |
| Engine 22 | Ladder Tower 4 | | | 2 | 467 Ocean Ave. | Greenville |
| Engine 10 | Ladder 12 | | | 4 | 325 Route 1 & 9 | Marion |
| | | Marine Unit 1, Marine Unit 2 (Fireboats) | | 1 | Liberty Landing Marina, Audrey Zapp Dr. | Liberty State Park |
| | | Rescue 2 (Metro USAR Collapse Rescue Strike Team Unit), | | 4 | 48 State St. | Bergen Hill |
| | | Car 26 (Gong Club Canteen/Rehab. Truck) | | | 666 Summit Ave. | Jersey City Heights |
| | | Arson Unit, Fire Prevention | Chief of Department | | 2 Jackson Square | West Bergen |

== Ranks of the Jersey City Fire Department ==
| Rank titles | Insignia |
|---|---|
| Chief of Department | |
| Deputy Chief | |
| Battalion Chief | |
| Captain | |
| Firefighter | No Insignia |

=== Disbanded fire companies ===
Throughout the JCFD's history, several fire companies have been disbanded due to budget cuts to the department and reorganization. Reserve and spare apparatus assigned with disbanded company numbers

- Engine 1 – 153 Morgan St. (Re-Established Jan.2021)
- Engine 3 – 38 Mercer St.
- Engine 4 – 355 Newark Ave. (Re-designated as Squad 4 at 582 Communipaw Ave.)
- Engine 12 – 103 Webster Ave.
- Engine 16 – 93 Belmont Ave.
- Engine 20 – 582 Communipaw Ave.
- Engine 21 – 9th St. & Grove St.
- Ladder 1 – 160 Grand St.
- Ladder 5 – 582 Communipaw Ave.
- Ladder 10 – 520 Palisade Ave.
- Water Tower 1 – 520 Palisade Ave.
- Hose 1 – 153 Morgan St.
- Salvage 1 - 666 Summit Ave.
- Hose Reel - 355 Newark Ave.
