= Fairmount Apartments =

Fairmount Apartments may refer to:

- Fairmount Apartments (Wichita, Kansas), listed on the NRHP in Kansas
- Fairmount Apartments (Jersey City, New Jersey), listed on the NRHP in New Jersey
