= Temple Beth-El (Jersey City, New Jersey) =

Reform Jewish synagogue in Jersey City, New Jersey, US

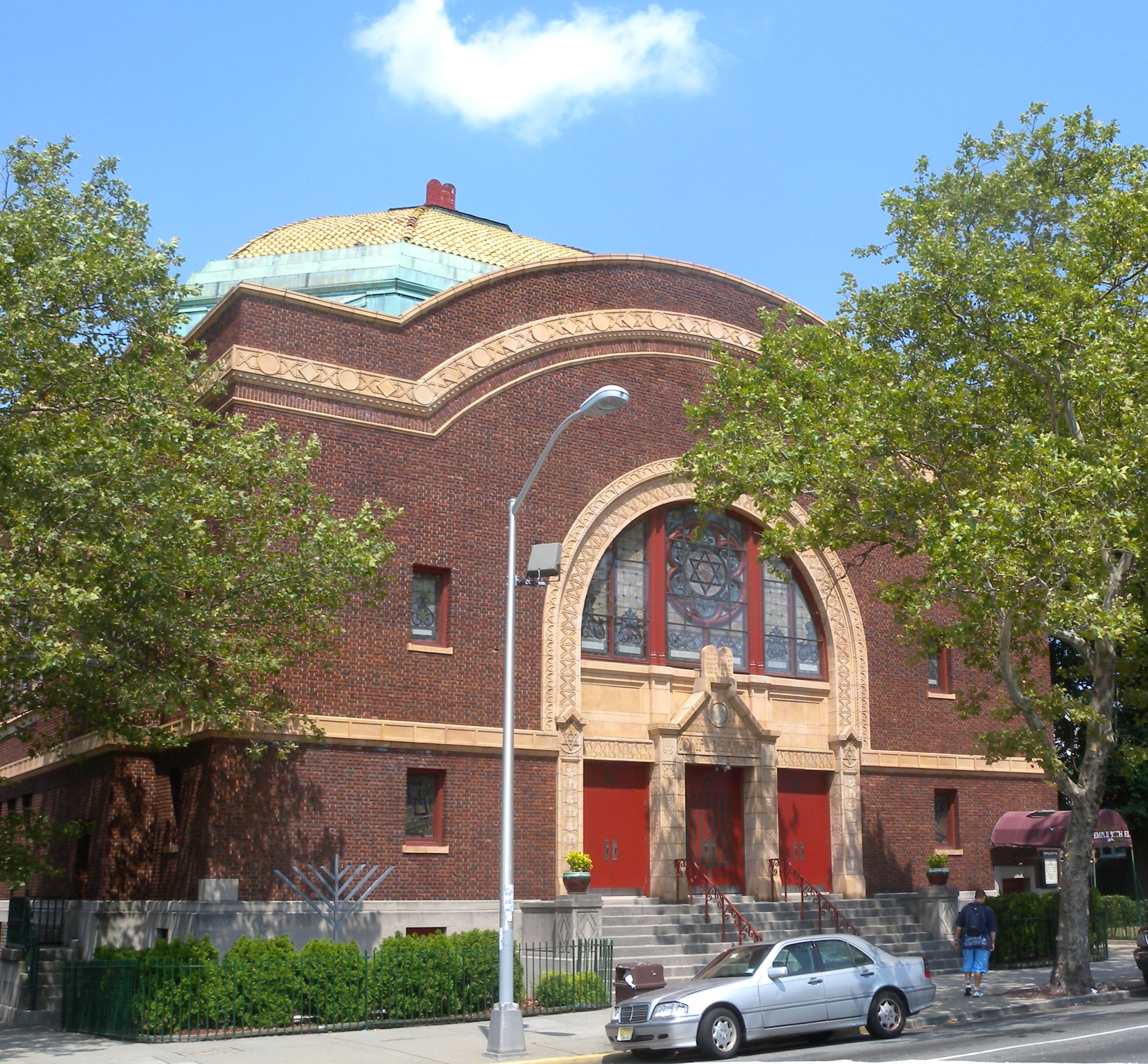
- Temple Beth-El, across Kennedy Boulevard

- Location in Hudson County, New Jersey

Religion
- Affiliation: Reform Judaism
- Ecclesiastical or organizational status: Synagogue
- Status: Active

Location
- Location: 2419 Kennedy Boulevard, Bergen Section, Jersey City, Hudson County, New Jersey
- Country: United States
- Interactive map of Temple Beth-El
- Coordinates: 40°43′13″N 74°04′39″W

Architecture
- Architect: Percie Vivarttas
- Type: Synagogue
- Style: Byzantine Revival
- Established: 1871 (as a congregation)
- Completed: 1926

Specifications
- Capacity: 1,000 worshippers
- Dome: One

Website
- betheljc.org

Temple Beth-El is a Reform Jewish synagogue located at 2419 Kennedy Boulevard in the Bergen Section of Jersey City, Hudson County, New Jersey, in the United States.

The synagogue building is located within the West Bergen-East Lincoln Park Historic District, designated by the Jersey City City Council in June 2015.

== History ==
=== 19th century ===
At end of the Civil War (c. 1864-65), a group of Jews in Jersey City began to meet at 96 Montgomery Street and study and pray in the Orthodox Jewish tradition. A group moved nearby to York Street. They formalized this community under the name of the Isaac Ephraim Congregation, then Beth Israel Congregation, and finally Temple Beth-El in 1871. The Temple's earliest records date from 1891.

Some years later a group of congregants left B'nai Ephraim to found a branch of Reform Judaism in the city. The Reform members moved for a time to a former Christian church at Grove and Montgomery streets. Its spiritual leader, Rabbi J. Schweizer, sought to lead "a more liberal interpretation of Jewish faith" ("Will Build") making changes in temple practices. He held Friday services at 8:15 PM rather than sundown and Saturday services at 10:00 AM to accommodate a larger number of men and women and started a popular Sunday school. His founding of a Young People's Hebrew Association and Helping Hands Society gave the temple greater visibility in the community for its charitable programs and was increasingly popular with the new Jewish settlement in Jersey City. An 1892 newspaper article commented on Rabbi Schweizer's lectures delivered in English rather than Hebrew: "He argues that English is the language with which his congregation is most familiar, and he intends to so conduct the service, that even the stranger within the gate may understand him. Finally Rabbi Schweizer also introduced an organ and a choir".

Rabbi Schweizer eventually led the Reform members to leave B'nai Ephraim to the Orthodox congregants. They set out to build a new synagogue at York Street between Varick and Monmouth Streets, where it purchased two lots in 1891. The new Reform synagogue was named Temple Beth-El, meaning House of God, and looked to become the center of Reform Judaism in Jersey City.

=== 20th century ===
In 1914 Temple Beth-El appointed Rabbi/Doctor Maurice Thorner of the Jewish Reform movement as their spiritual leader; he brought the temple into the Union of American Hebrew Congregations that represents the Reform branch of Judaism. In an interview in 1996, Rabbi Kenneth Brickman explained that Temple Beth-El "was philosophically Reform, but was always spiritually more traditional than other Reform congregations" (Quoted in Hileman). Its Reform practices included confirmation and wearing of yarmulkes in temple.

==== Kennedy Boulevard synagogue ====
The Reform temple remained in downtown Jersey City until September 1926 when it moved to its present location on Kennedy Boulevard. On property purchased in 1922, a ground-breaking ceremony took place on June 7, 1925, for a new temple.

Temple Beth-El's building is inspired by the Hagia Sophia in Istanbul. The brick, domed, Byzantine Revival-styled synagogue building was designed by architect Percie Vivarttas of Weehawken. The red brick façade features an arched roofline that forms a pattern in contrasting brick on the walls below and over the front door entrance and side windows. The inset roof with a dome has a central stained glass oculus, permitting light to filter into the building. The sanctuary had walnut pews for a seating capacity of one thousand; the pews facing a deep archway over the altar and Ark of the Covenant.

==== Congregational developments ====
In 1936 Rabbi Samuel A. Berman became the rabbi of the congregation and served with distinction for fifty years. The congregation grew and flourished under his leadership, along with Cantor Abraham Berman, continuing its tradition of serving others. Temple Beth-El has an established tradition of community service in Jersey City. During World War I, its members assisted with a recreation fund for soldiers' camps and one for war victims. Its Sisterhood volunteered to work for the Red Cross during World War II. Congregation members supported the creation of the State of Israel in 1949 and sponsored bond drives for Israel. After the Jewish Community Center on Bergen Avenue closed, the temple took over that role for several Jewish groups, such as Hadassah, the Jewish War Veterans, and the United Jewish Association (United Jewish Appeal of Jersey City). During the 1960s, it housed a Head Start program at the shul. The congregation was an advocate for civil rights and holds an Annual Dr. Martin Luther King Jr. Sabbath Service each January with an African-American speaker. This tradition began after the congregation joined its neighbors at a talk given by Dr. King Jr. at the nearby A.M.E. Zion Church on Bergen Avenue shortly before Dr. King's assassination.

When a fire destroyed the Clair Memorial United Methodist Church on Communipaw Avenue on April 10, 2001, the board of trustees of Beth-El invited the African-American parishioners to hold their Easter service at the Temple. This led to a continuation of the practice as Clair Memorial held its Sunday services in the social hall until its own church building re-opened. In August 2001, the Congress of Racial Equality (CORE) presented the Temple and Clair Memorial its Harmony Award "celebrating amicable relationships between whites and blacks" (Rinn). In recognition for this good deed, about thirty employees of Goldman-Sachs, as part of its Community Team Works program, sought to reward the Temple. In May 2003, the volunteers helped with the construction of a much-needed ramp for handicap access to the sanctuary on the first floor.

Temple Beth-El reached its peak of membership in the 1950s and 1960s with 700 families and over 300 students in its Hebrew school. The congregation had 550 families in 1971, 380 families in 1984, and approximately 175 families in 2001. The decline of the Jewish population in Jersey City, by moving to the suburbs or retirement communities, affected the temple. However, the arrival of newcomers to the city during the real estate boom on the Jersey City waterfront and around the city from 2000 onward, has revitalized the congregation.

=== 21st century ===
One of the hallmarks of the congregation is its outreach to a diverse Jewish community, especially its welcoming of the LGBTQ community, interfaith households, and those from many ethnic and cultural backgrounds. Members come from all over Hudson County and beyond. The congregation also adopted an innovative membership program in 2012 called Terumah, which allows households to make an annual voluntary pledge in place of traditional annual dues. In 2012 the congregation also made its High Holy Day services equally open to members and non-members without any required donation.

When the condition of the building declined, the congregation considered developing part of its property to raise funds. This plan was dropped after research showed it was more advantageous to keep the full temple lot intact. The members voted in 2015 to remain at their current location and renovate the main sanctuary building. The same year, the congregation demolished its 110-year-old Samuel Berman House, also on Kennedy Boulevard, as a means to cut costs.

Hurricane Irene in 2011 caused considerable damage to an already compromised roof, leading to issues with ceilings and walls in the building. Temporary repairs were made but an expensive roof replacement was needed. This was completed in 2016 as the first step in the renovation process.

From 2011 to 2017 the congregation was served by Rabbi Debra Hachen. The congregation's membership grew from a low of around 90 households around 2008 to a membership of 150 households in 2016 as demographics in Hudson County began to change and many younger adults and families sought out urban living. The congregation established a Jewish Young Adults of Jersey City group in 2013. The religious school of Temple Beth-El served over 50 children as of 2016. Temple Beth-El was also a founding congregation in the interfaith community organizing group known as Jersey City Together which began in 2015.

On the morning of October 3, 2016, Temple Beth-El celebrated the 90th anniversary of the sanctuary building during the Rosh Hashanah worship service.

In 2018 Rabbi Leana Moritt took over the pulpit as Rabbi and Spiritual Leader of Temple Beth-El. In the next two years the temple community continued to grow with family membership approaching 180 families and with religious school enrollment of 75 children. Temple Beth-El intends to celebrate the 100th Anniversary of its current building in 2026 in a newly renovated space. A campaign was started to raise the necessary funds to create a modern, energy-efficient, space for the next 100 years.

== Notable members ==
- Charles K. Krieger, an interim mayor of Jersey City
- Morris Pesin, one of the founders of Liberty State Park

== See also ==
- Congregation Adas Emuno
- United Synagogue of Hoboken
- Jewish Museum of New Jersey
