= The Beacon (Jersey City) =

Development in New Jersey, US

- Jersey City Medical Center
- U.S. National Register of Historic Places
- New Jersey Register of Historic Places
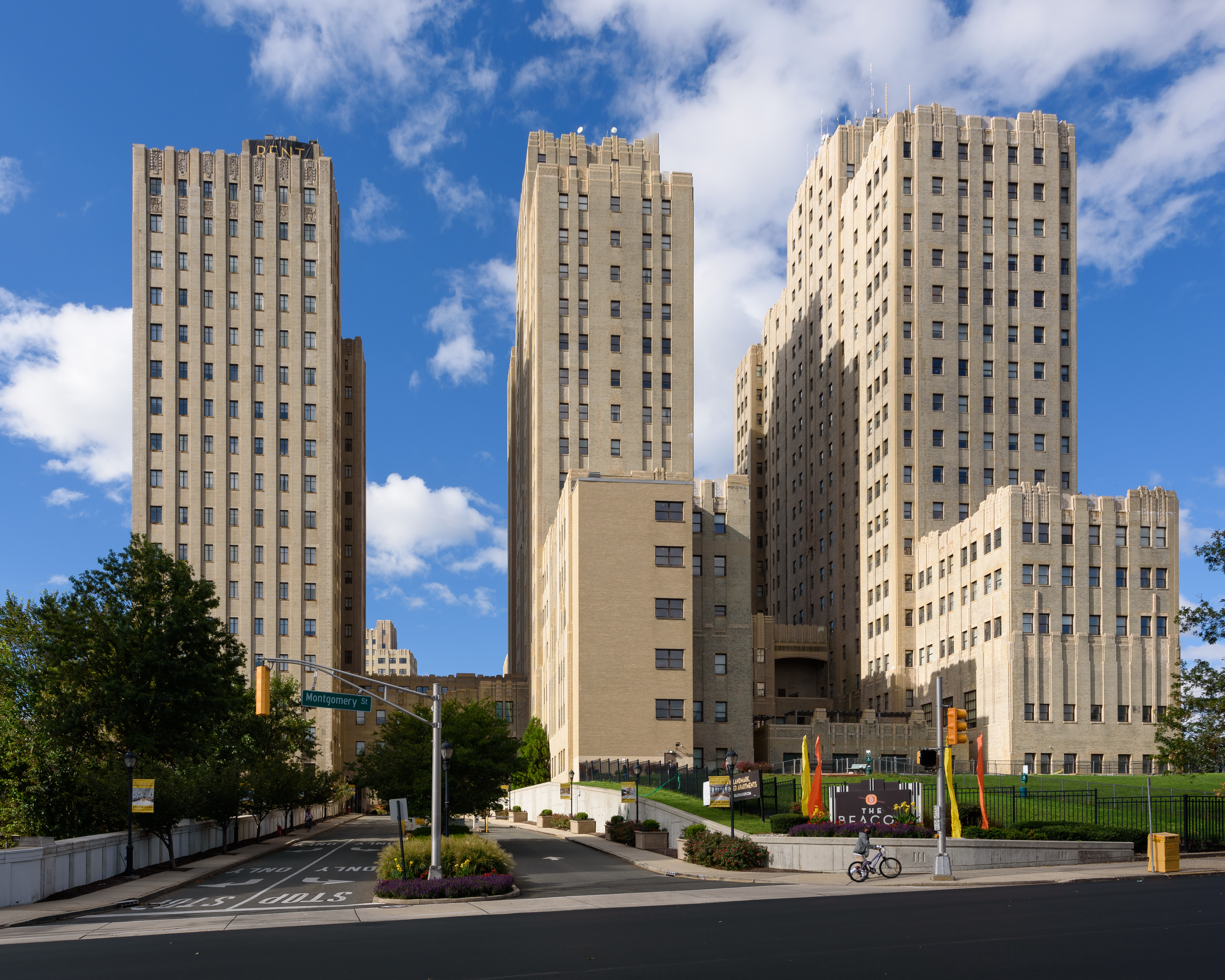
- The Beacon in 2020

- Location within Hudson County, New Jersey
- Location: Roughly bounded by Montgomery Street, Cornelison Avenue, Dupont Street and Clifton Place, and Baldwin Avenue, Jersey City, New Jersey
- Coordinates: 40°43′20″N 74°3′51″W
- NRHP reference No.: 85003057
- NJRHP No.: 1515

Significant dates
- Added to NRHP: November 27, 1985
- Designated NJRHP: March 19, 1985

The Beacon is a mixed-use development located on a 14-acre (57,000 m^{2}) site on Bergen Hill, a crest of the Hudson Palisades and one of the highest geographical points in Jersey City, Hudson County, in the U.S. state of New Jersey. The Beacon, which occupies the Jersey City Medical Center's rehabilitated original complex, creates the northeastern corner of the Bergen-Lafayette section and is just east of McGinley Square. The Beacon includes 2,000,000 square feet (190,000 m^{2}) of residential and retail space, approximately 1,200 luxury residences and 80,000 square feet (7,400 m^{2}) of retail space.

Jersey City Medical Center moved to the site in 1882, and the complex was expanded in stages through the mid-20th century. Metrovest Equities was designated the redeveloper of the property in the first decade of the 21st century. The redevelopment stalled after a down-turn in the market, but was completed by April 2016.

The complex is listed on the national and New Jersey registers of historic places.

== History ==
During the Great Depression, new buildings were added as a Works Progress Administration project secured by Mayor Frank Hague, The Jersey City Medical Center included such architectural and designer trappings as marble walls, terrazzo floors, etched glass, decorative moldings and glittering chandeliers, and had one of the most famous maternity wards in the country – the Margaret Hague Maternity Hospital. By the 1940s, it had become the third-largest medical center in the world.

From 1956 to 1968, JCMC was the home of the Seton Hall College of Medicine and Dentistry, the predecessor to the University of Medicine and Dentistry of New Jersey, formerly located in Newark. Oversized and understaffed, in 1988 the hospital became a private, non-profit organization. In 1994, the State of New Jersey designated it as a regional trauma center, and in the late 1990s it was approved as a core teaching affiliate of Mount Sinai School of Medicine.

Metrovest Equities was designated the redeveloper of the property in 2003 and officially closed on it in 2005. The developer converted the ten federally landmarked, Art Deco buildings in the largest residential restoration project in the country and the largest in the history of New Jersey, with an expected cost estimated at $350 million.

== Use of existing infrastructure and restoration ==
The existing buildings are listed on the New Jersey Register of Historic Places and National Register of Historic Places.

The first buildings to be renovated were the Rialto and Capitol buildings, which now serve as residential condominiums and entertainment spaces. The restoration of these two buildings alone was estimated over $133 million and it took over four years to complete. In 2009, the New Jersey Department of Environmental Protection Historic Preservation Office awarded an Outstanding Contribution of Excellence Award to the contractors, architects, and others who participated in the restoration of the Rialto and Capitol buildings.

== Popular culture ==
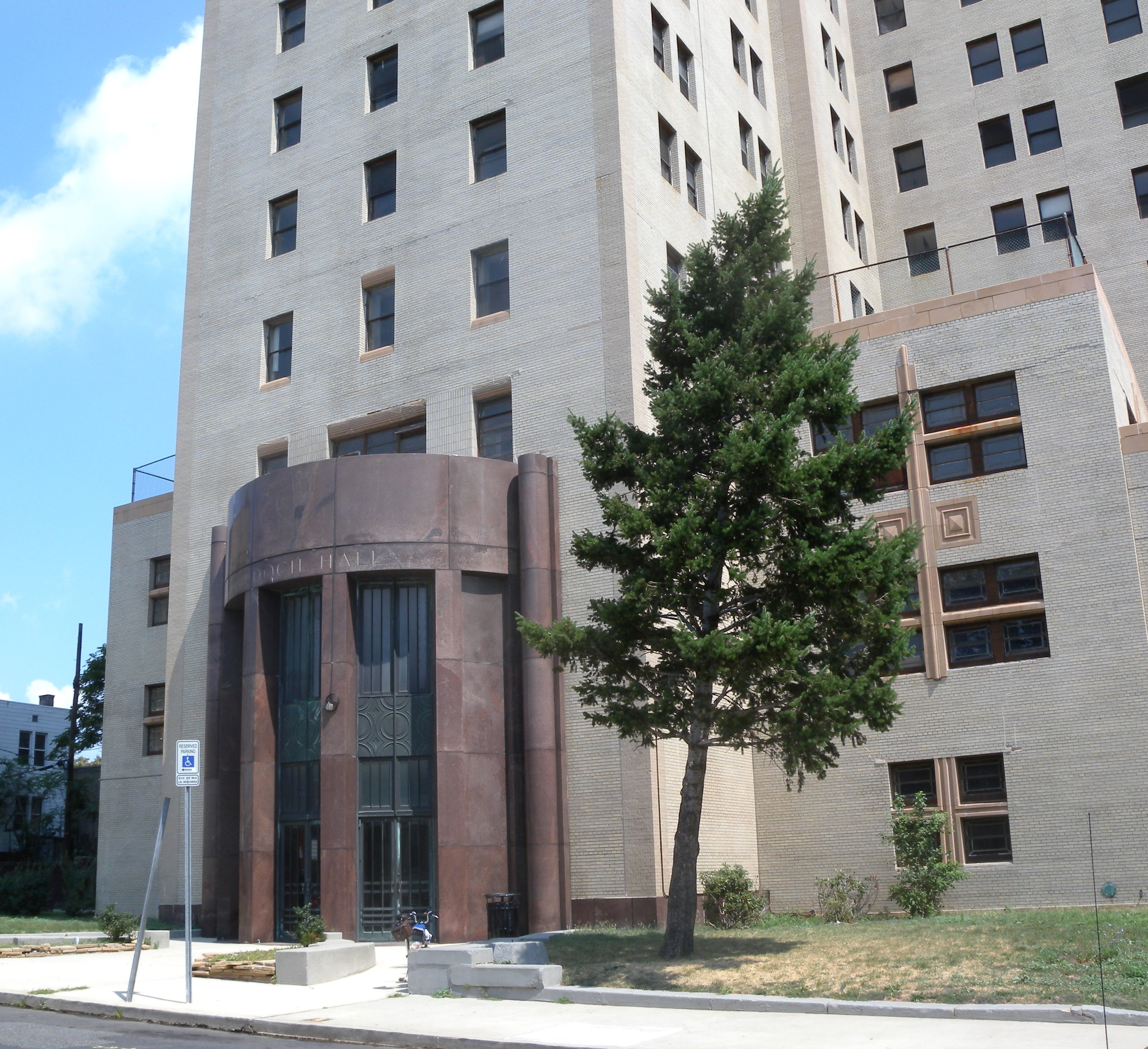
Murdoch Hall

Both the exterior and the interior of the building were used as a filming location for the 1994 Robert Redford film Quiz Show depicting the 1950s quiz show scandals. Sections of the interior of Murdoch Hall were used because they resembled the art deco backdrop of Manhattan's Rockefeller Center, where the game show Twenty-One was filmed. Approximately $25,000 was spent on renovating the neglected building to render it suitable for filming.

Richard Price's 1992 novel, Clockers, makes a thinly veiled reference to the abandoned Margaret Hague Maternity Hospital on Clifton Place. A "chronicler of Hudson County's underbelly", Price describes how vandals stripped the hospital interior of artifacts to be sold for scrap.

== See also ==
- List of neighborhoods in Jersey City, New Jersey
- List of Registered Historic Places in Hudson County, New Jersey
- Historic districts in Hudson County, New Jersey
- Whitlock Cordage
- Hudson and Manhattan Railroad Powerhouse
- Dixon Mills

Preceded by 26 Journal Square	Tallest Building in Jersey City; The Orpheum; 1931—1936; 90m	Succeeded by Jersey City Medical Center
Preceded by Jersey City Medical Center	Tallest Building in Jersey City; B.S. Pollack Hospital; 1936—1989; 98m	Succeeded by Harborside Financial Center
