= Bergen-Lafayette, Jersey City =

Populated place in Hudson County, New Jersey, US

Bergen-Lafayette is a section of Jersey City, New Jersey.

As its name implies, Bergen-Lafayette is made of different neighborhoods. It lies west-southwest of Downtown and Liberty State Park. Its less-defined other borders overlap those of Greenville at Hudson-Bergen Light Rail to the south, Lincoln Park/West Bergen to the west, and Montgomery Street at McGinley Square to the north.

The name Bergen, used throughout Hudson County, is taken from the original Bergen, New Netherland settlement at Bergen Square. The district can correspond to the former Bergen City, which existed from 1855 to 1870 and was originally incorporated as a town by an Act of the New Jersey Legislature on March 24, 1855, from portions of Bergen Township. In 1862, it did a reverse takeover, absorbing the remaining portions Bergen Township. On April 14, 1863, portions of the town were taken to form Greenville Township. Bergen was reincorporated as a city on March 11, 1868. On May 2, 1870, both Bergen City and Hudson City elected to merge with Jersey City.

== Bergen ==
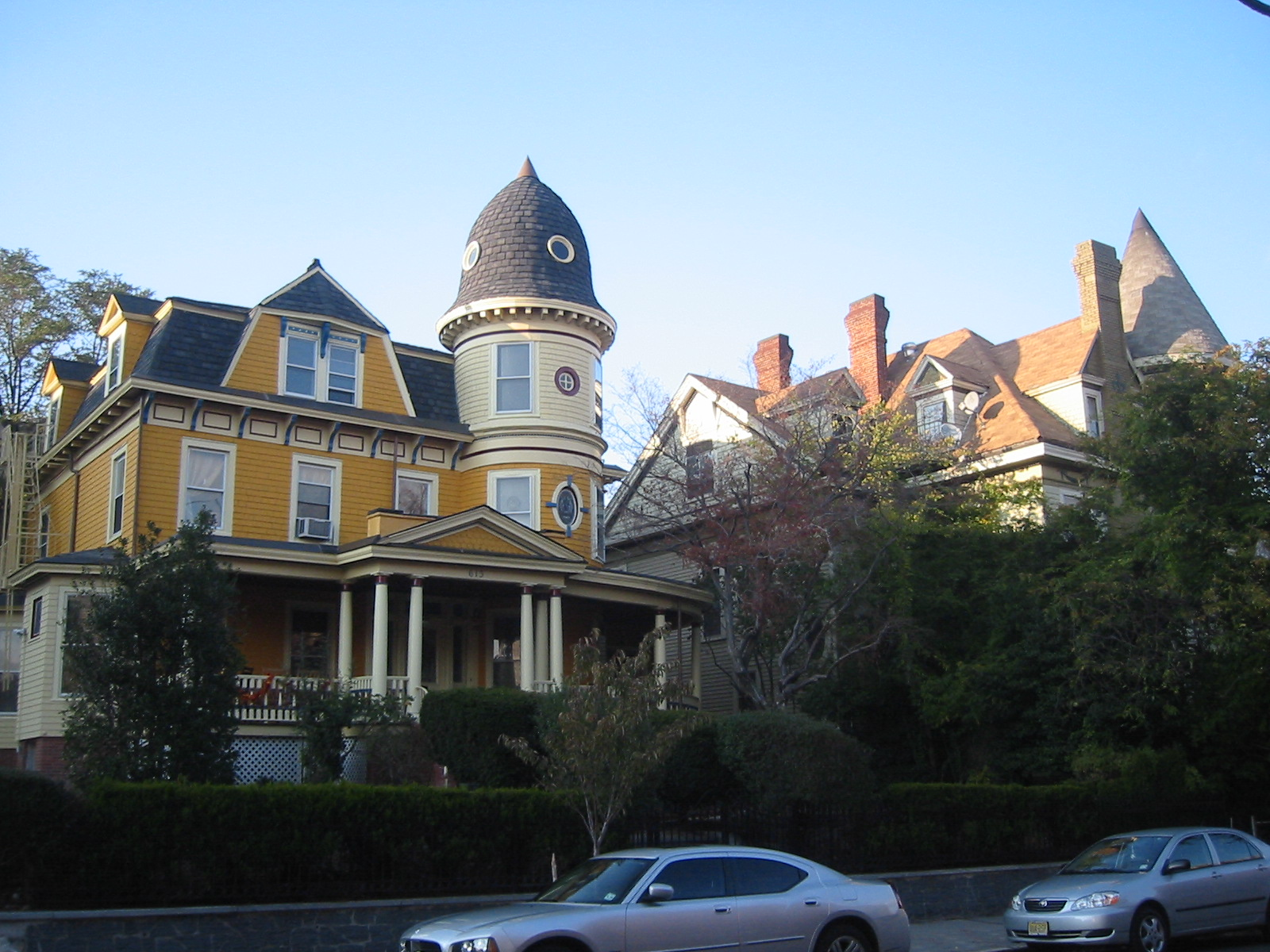
Restored Victorian mansions on Bergen Avenue

Kennedy Boulevard and Bergen Avenue are a major north–south thoroughfares in the city running south from Journal Square along the ridge of the diminishing Hudson Palisades. A variety of architectural styles can be found along these streets and their sidestreets including 19th-century rowhouses, Victorian mansions, and pre-war and Art Deco apartment buildings, and the Renaissance Revival former Jersey City YMCA. Monticello Avenue is a shopping district lined with many turn-of-the-century buildings with storefronts being brought back into use. The Fairmount Apartments and Temple Beth-El are a prominent landmark on Kennedy Boulevard. Lincoln the Mystic, a statue of a seated Abraham Lincoln by James Earle Fraser, is situated at its Boulevard entrance. As its name suggests West Bergen overlaps this neighborhood. The city is now defining this area with maps and other promotions to encourage use of the name McGinley Square.

== Beacon ==
In 2005 the former Jersey City Medical Center was renovated and restored as The Beacon, with approximately 1,200 new residences. The 14-acre (57,000 m^{2}) site is located at the northwest corner of the district atop Bergen Hill east of McGinley Square.

== The Junction, Bergen Hill, and Jackson Hill ==
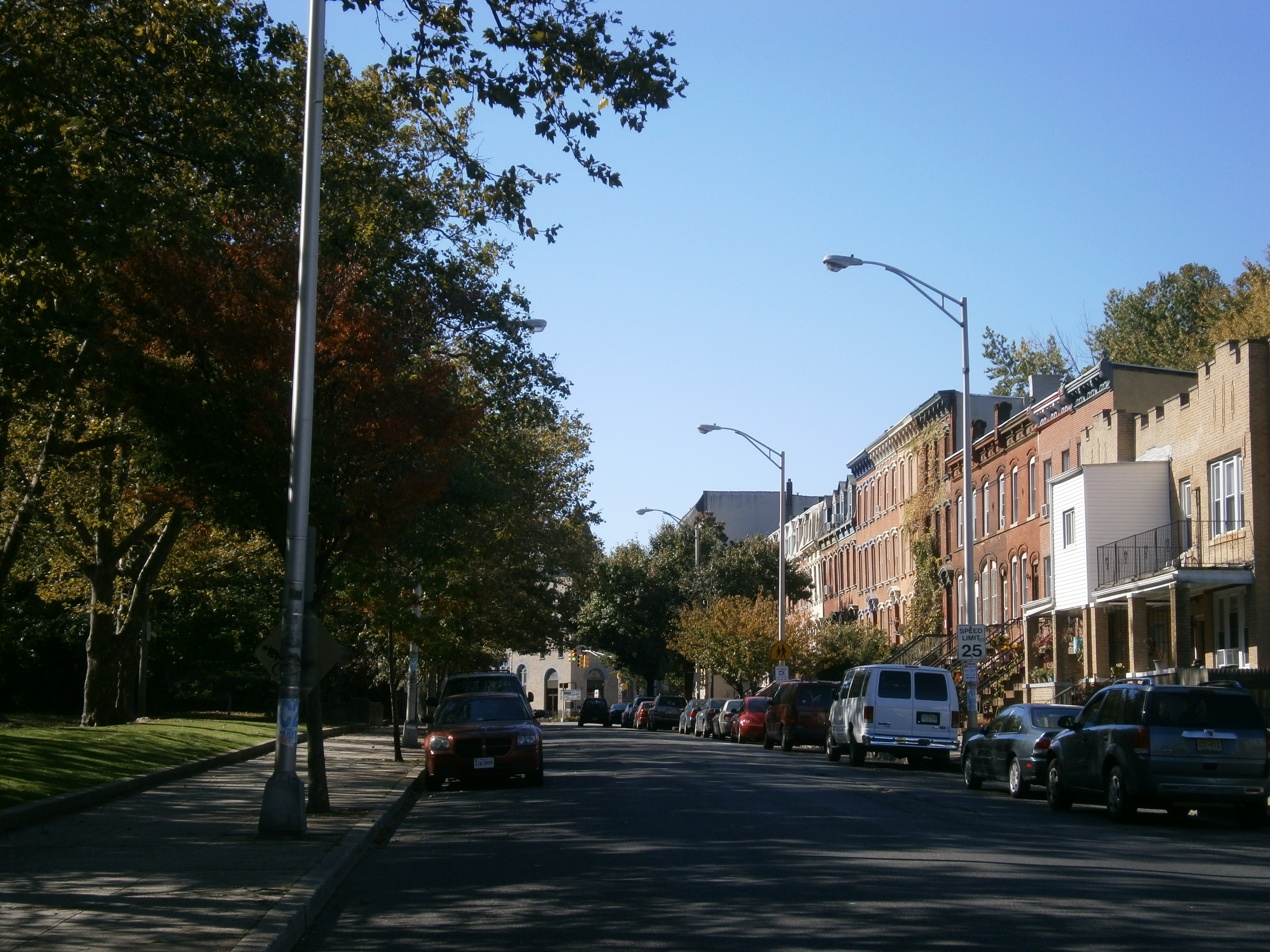
Grand street ascending hill at Arlington Park

Communipaw Junction, or simply, The Junction, is where Communipaw, Summit Avenue and Garfield Avenue, and Grand Street meet. The Bergen Hill Historic District is centered on Summit Avenue as it ascends from the Junction. Bergen Hill, or The Hill, refers to the emergence of the New Jersey Palisades. The district is not on National Register of Historic Places, but has a state designation. Library Hall is a renovated 1866 building that served as the town hall for Bergen Township then later as Bergen City before it was annexed by Jersey City in 1870. Library Hall now serves as a residential building. A prominent landmark is St. John's Church. Lincoln High School is on Crescent Avenue. Ficken's Warehouse is on Grand Street, which as it ascends from the Junction to the St. Patrick's Parish and Buildings at Bramhall Ave. (40°42′50″N 74°4′23″W). While not in the city historic district, this complex received its federal historic status in September 1980 and anchors the surrounding streets, some of which are lined with well-preserved or restored 18th-century row houses in Jackson Hill. MLK Drive has long been a commercial street for the southern part of the district. The neighborhood sometimes called Claremont lies south of Arlington Park, where before discontinuation of service the Central Railroad of New Jersey maintained station.

== Communipaw-Lafayette ==
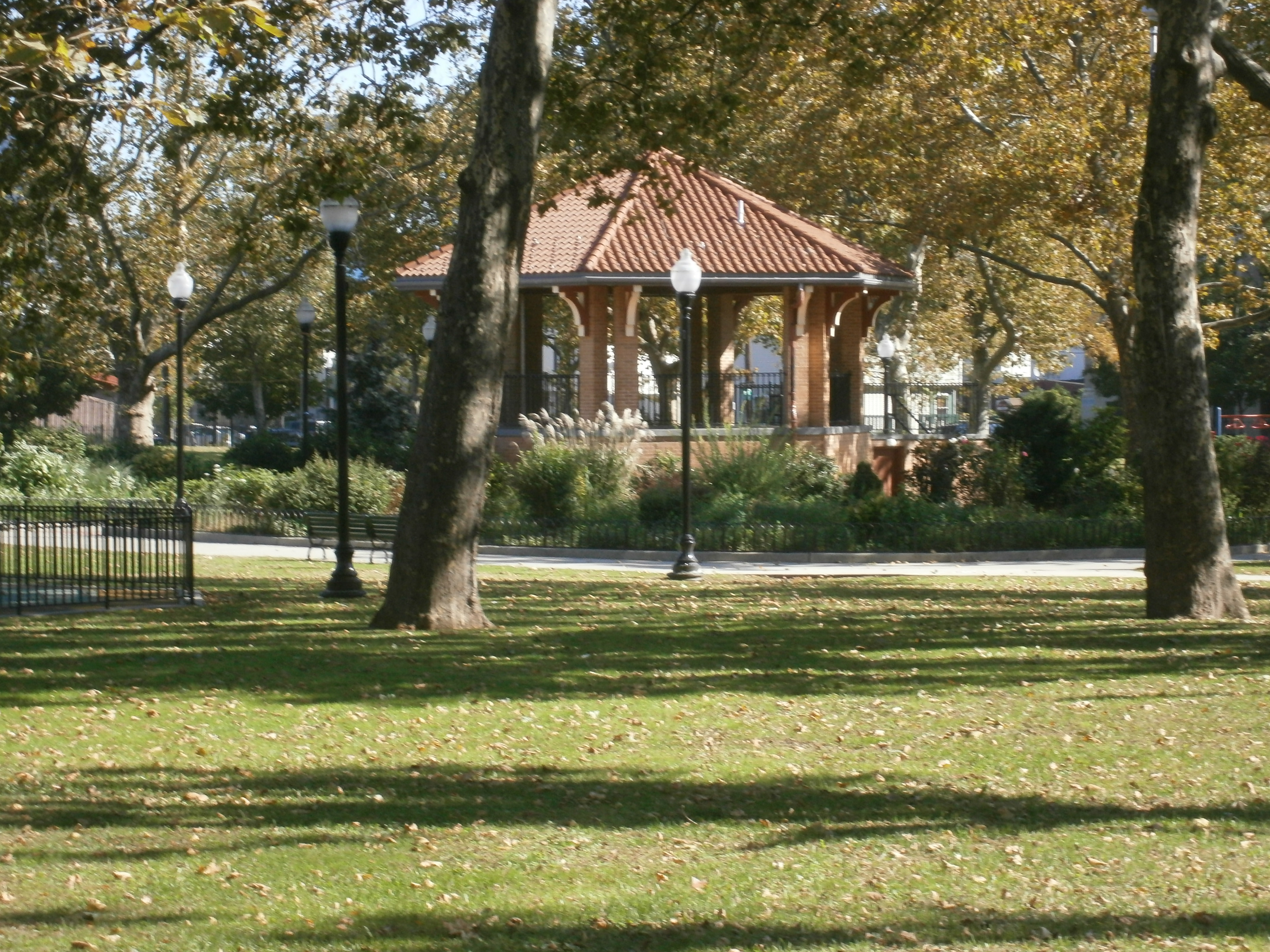
Gazebo at Lafayette Park

Lafayette Park gives its name to the lower, or eastern, portion of the district closest to Downtown Jersey City. It is likely named for the Marquis de Lafayette, who was stationed in Bergen in 1779, and later re-visited in 1824. A city square similar to Van Vorst Park and Hamilton Park the buildings surrounding it were constructed in different periods. Before land-filling in the early twentieth century this area was located on the Upper New York Bay. The Hackensack Indian village of Communipaw and the 16th century New Netherland plantation of Jan Everts Bout, site of the Pavonia Massacre, were located here. Whitlock Cordage is an intact complex of industrial buildings built in the Lafayette section along the banks of the Morris Canal. The Housing Trust of America purchased the property to preserve the structures as affordable housing. Parts of the neighborhood are part of the Communipaw-Lafayette Historic District. Berry Lane Park, which upon completion will be the largest municipal park in Jersey City, is under construction along Garfield Avenue.

== Transportation ==
The Liberty State Park, Garfield Avenue, and Martin Luther King stations of the Hudson-Bergen Light Rail are on the periphery of the section. New Jersey Transit bus routes 6, 8, 16, 81, 87 to Journal Square, Exchange Place, and Hoboken Terminal serve the area locally.

== See also ==
- National Register of Historic Places listings in Hudson County, New Jersey
- List of neighborhoods in Jersey City, New Jersey
- Red & Tan in Hudson County
- Lafayette Branch
