= Bergen Section, Jersey City =

Populated place in Hudson County, New Jersey, US

Bergen Section
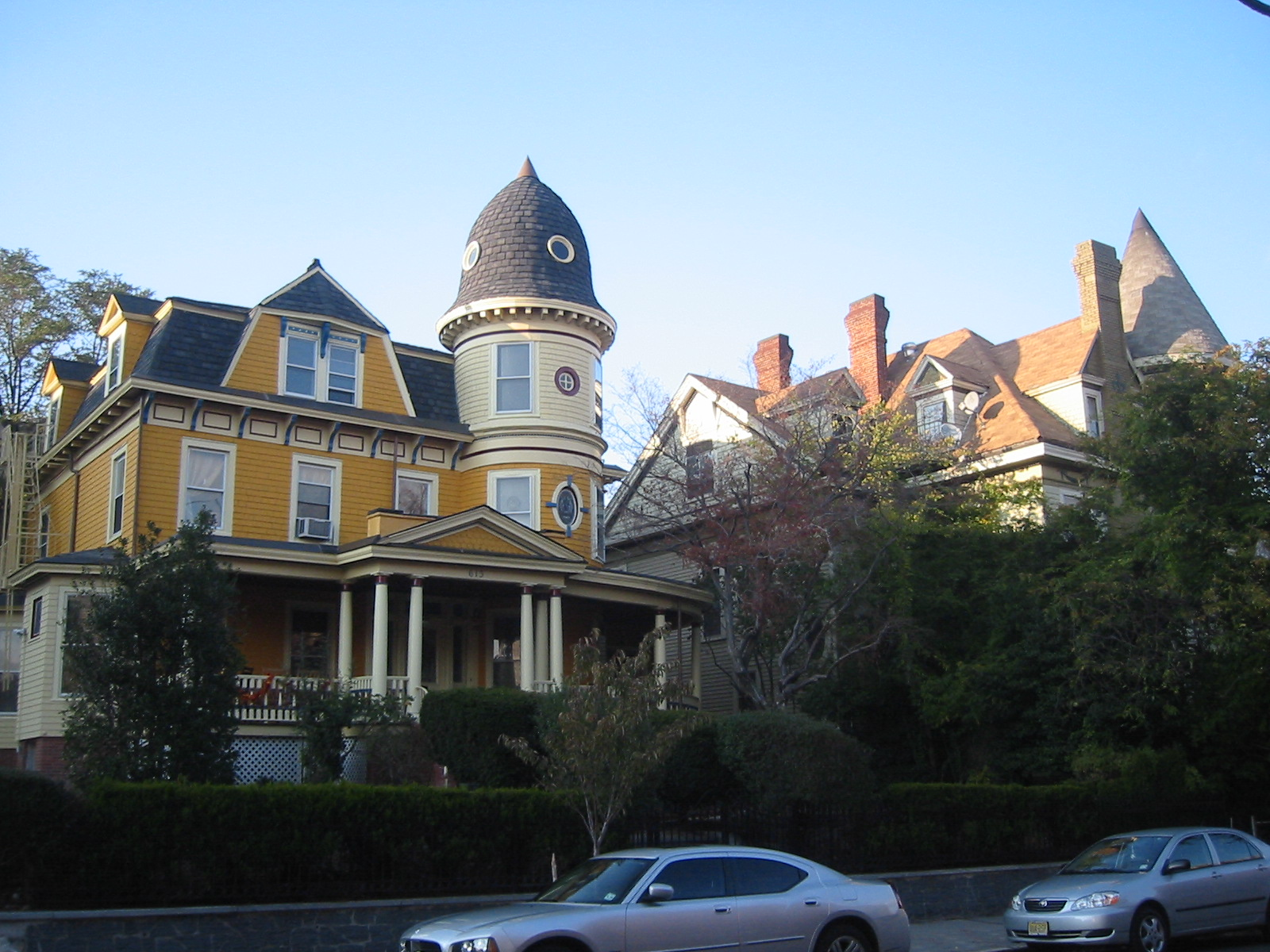
- Restored Victorian mansions on Bergen Avenue

- Bergen Section in Hudson County in New Jersey
- Coordinates: 40°43′45″N 74°03′57″W
- Country: United States
- State: New Jersey
- County: Hudson
- City: Jersey City
- Elevation: 85 ft (26 m)
- Postal code: 07305
- Area code: 201
- GNIS feature ID: 882003

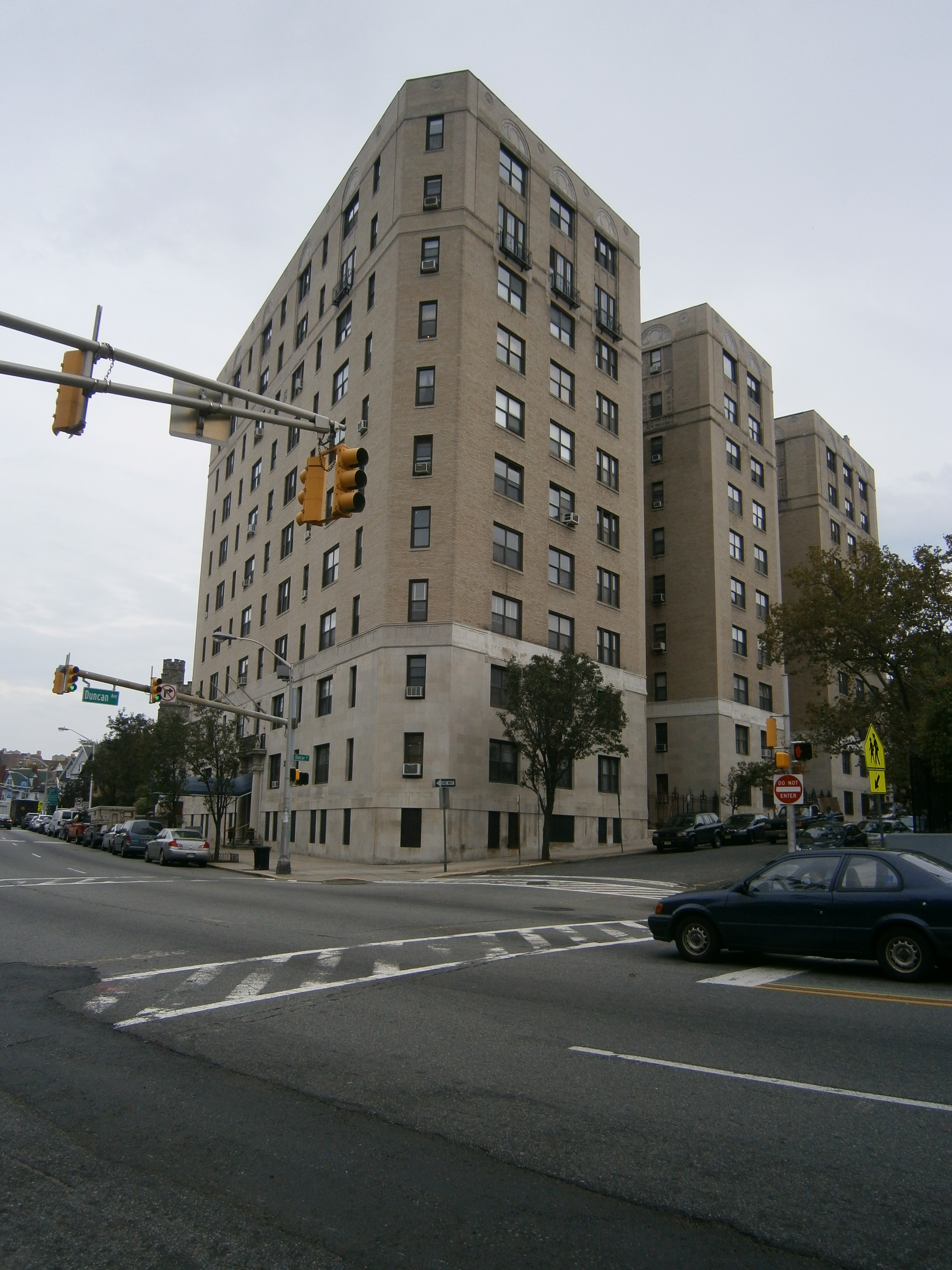
Building on what was then Hudson Boulevard during residence of Mayor Hague

The Bergen Section of Jersey City, New Jersey is the neighborhood on either side of Kennedy Boulevard between Saint Peter's College/ McGinley Square and Communipaw Avenue in the Bergen-Lafayette section of the city. The name Bergen, used throughout Hudson County, is taken from the original Bergen, New Netherland settlement at Bergen Square.

While there was discussion of building a county long road as early as the 1870s, the Boulevard was officially opened in 1896. In the early automobile age it became part of the route of the Lincoln Highway and one of the busiest roads in the state. Bergen Avenue is a major north-south thoroughfare in the city running south from Journal Square along the ridge of the diminishing Hudson Palisades known as Bergen Hill. Monticello Avenue, which takes its name from mid 19th "suburban" development, is a shopping district lined with many turn-of-the-century buildings with storefronts being brought back into use. As its name suggests West Bergen overlaps this neighborhood.

The section retains much of the character that at one time made it the premiere 20th century residential district of the city. A variety of architectural styles can be found along the Boulevard, Bergen Avenue, and sidestreets including 19th-century rowhouses, Victorian and Edwardian mansions. Many of the multi-family buildings are pre-war, built during the period of expansive growth in the 1920s and 1930s, sometimes Art Deco style. including The Hague, residence of one of the city's best-known mayor, Frank Hague. Among the many landmarks in the area are the Fairmount Apartments, Temple Beth-El, and the former Jersey City YMCA. Lincoln the Mystic, a statue of a seated Abraham Lincoln by James Earle Fraser is situated at the entrance to the park which bears the president's name. and is one of the Hudson County's largest public green spaces.

== Historic district ==
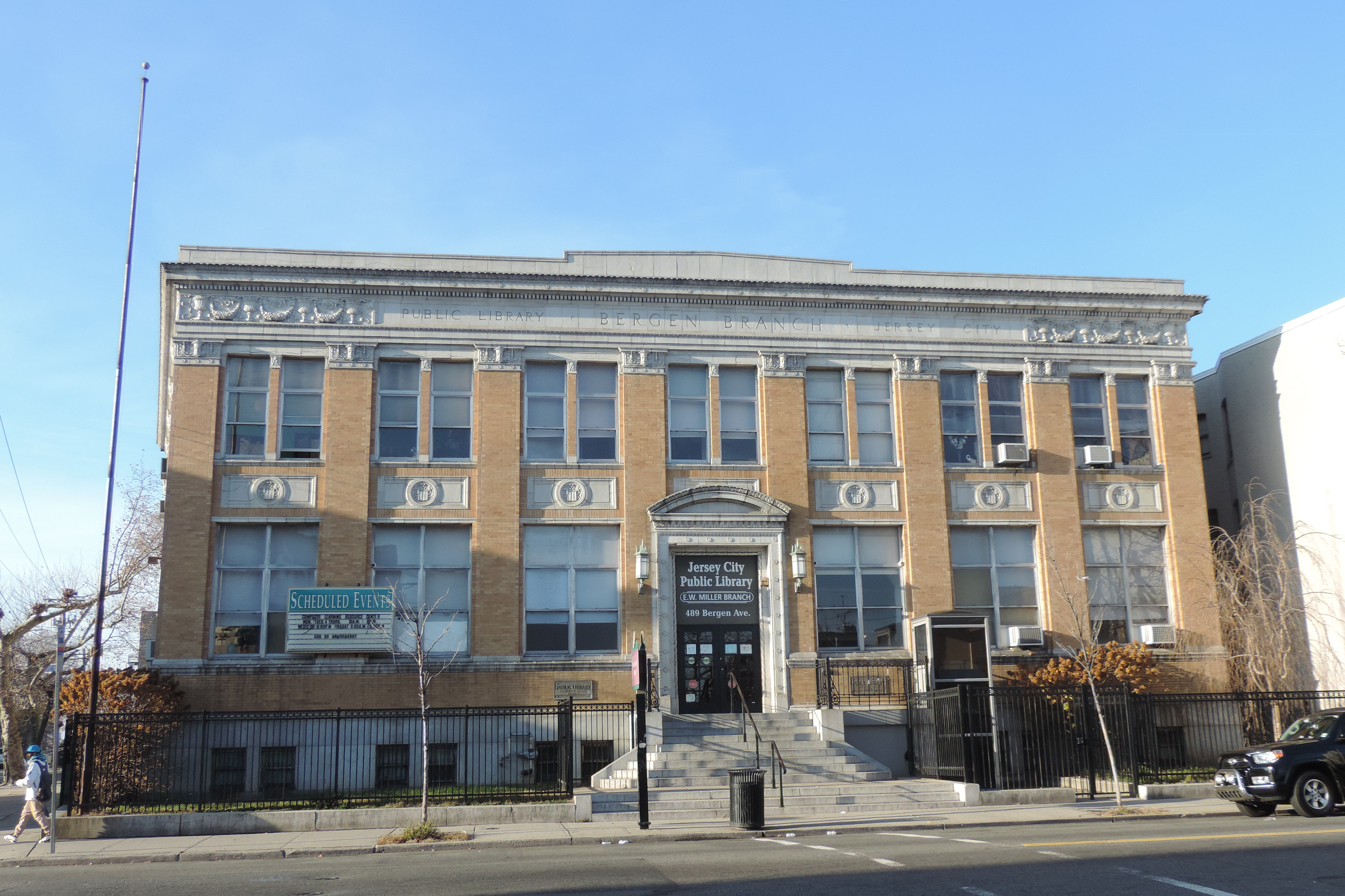
Edmund Miller Library, formerly Bergen Branch

In 1997, the New Jersey State Historic Preservation Office listed part of the neighborhood the West Bergen Historic District on the New Jersey Register of Historic Places. In 2011, The New Jersey Historic Trust" Garden State Historic Preservation Trust Fund provided the city with a $50,000 grant to conduct studies to determine if the area qualifies as a federal historic district. It describes it as architecturally significant with a diverse collection of mostly residential building built between the 1880s and 1930s. There are approximately 300 to 400 contributing property, some of which are large homes not found in the city's other historic districts, which are located Downtown. In 2014 The Jersey City Landmarks Conservancy proposed an area which is larger than the state-designated one called the West Bergen-East Lincoln Park Historic District. Approval was required by the city, and the ordinance was passed in June 2015.

== Transportation ==
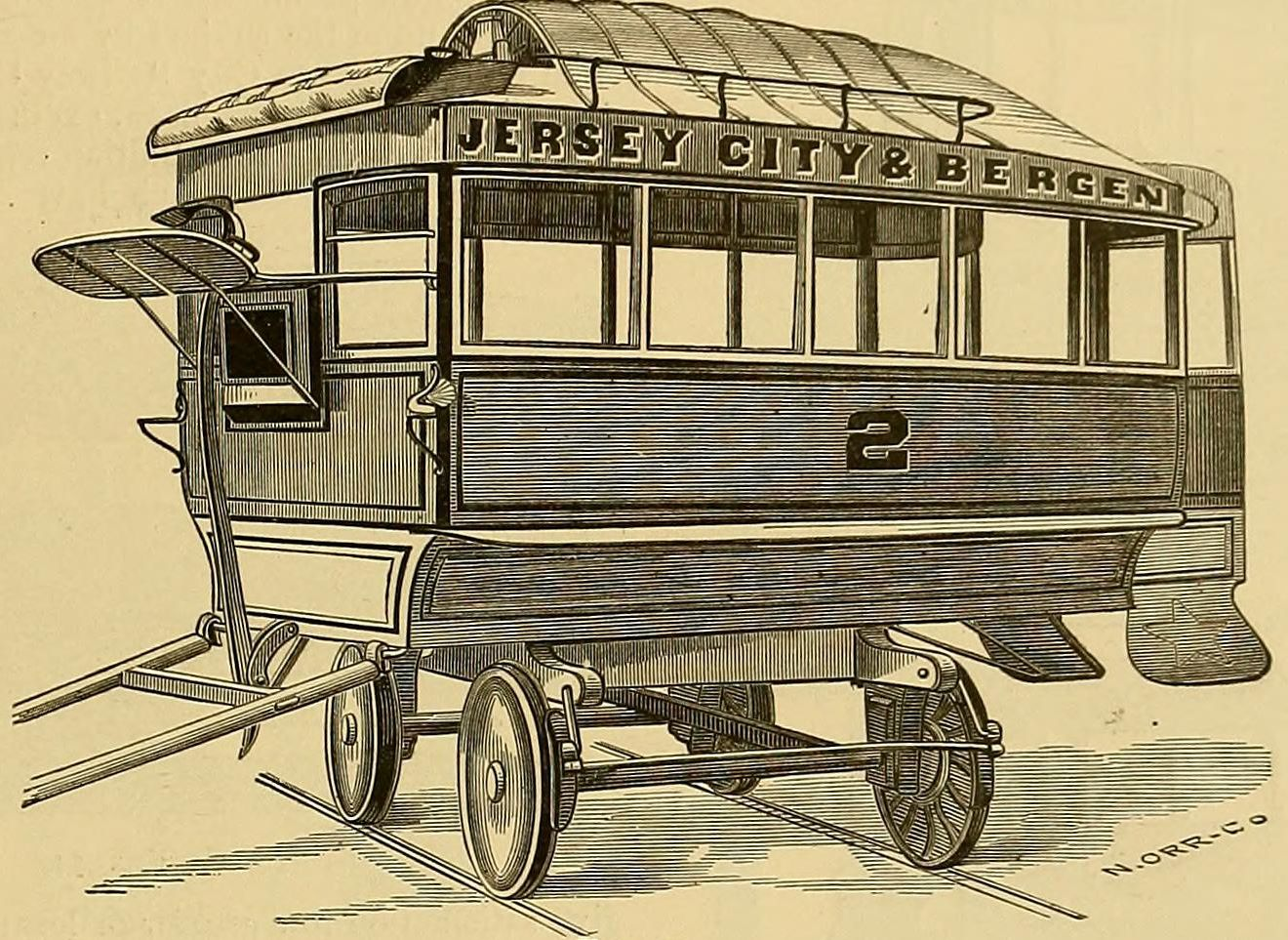
Jersey City and Bergen horse-drawn tram, 1887

- Monticello Avenue:
  - NJT 87 south bound to Greenville and northbound to Journal Square and Hudson Place (Hoboken)
- Bergen Avenue
  - NJT route 8 southbound to Greenville and northbound to Journal Square
- Kennedy Boulevard
  - NJT 10 southbound to Greenville/Bayonne and northbound to Journal Square
  - NJT 119 southbound to Bayonne and northbound service to Jersey City Heights and Port Authority Bus Terminal
- West Side Avenue
  - NJT 80 southbound to Greenville/Bayonne and northbound to Journal Square and Exchange Place.
  - NJT route 80S southbound to Droyer's Point and Hudson Mall and north bound to Journal Square.
  - NJT route 9 along West Side Avenue and Montgomery Street to McGinley Square and Exchange Place
