= James McIntosh (Medal of Honor) =

- Born: November 17, 1829; Canada
- Died: May 28, 1908 (aged 78)
- Burial place: Arlington Memorial Park, Kearny, New Jersey
- Military career
- Allegiance: United States
- Branch: United States Navy
- Rank: Captain of the Top
- Unit: (United States Navy) USS Richmond
- Conflicts: American Civil War • Battle of Mobile Bay
- Awards: Medal of Honor

James McIntosh (November 17, 1829 – May 28, 1908) was a Union Navy sailor in the American Civil War and a recipient of the U.S. military's highest decoration, the Medal of Honor, for his actions at the Battle of Mobile Bay.

Born on November 17, 1829, in Canada, McIntosh immigrated to the United States and was living in New York when he joined the U.S. Navy. He served during the Civil War as a captain of the top on the USS Richmond. At the Battle of Mobile Bay on August 5, 1864, he "performed his duties with skill and courage" despite heavy fire. For this action, he was awarded the Medal of Honor four months later, on December 31, 1864.

McIntosh's official Medal of Honor citation reads:

On board the U.S.S. Richmond during action against rebel forts and gunboats and with the ram Tennessee in Mobile Bay, 5 August 1864. Despite damage to his ship and the loss of several men on board as enemy fire raked her decks, McIntosh performed his duties with skill and courage throughout the prolonged battle which resulted in the surrender of the rebel ram Tennessee and in the successful attacks carried out on Fort Morgan.

McIntosh died on May 28, 1908, at age 78 while a resident of the Home for Disabled Soldiers in Kearny, New Jersey. He was buried in Kearny's Arlington Memorial Park.
