= North Arlington Jewish Cemetery =

- Interactive map of North Arlington Jewish Cemetery

Details
- Location: Belleville Turnpike; North Arlington, New Jersey
- Country: United States
- Coordinates: 40.77250°N 74.13220°W
- Find a Grave: North Arlington Jewish Cemetery

North Arlington Jewish Cemetery is a cemetery dating to the turn of the 19th century, and located in North Arlington, New Jersey, along Belleville Turnpike (New Jersey Route 7). It is situated on a roughly triangular four-acre piece of land, between the gritty industrial park of Porete Avenue and the much larger Arlington Memorial Park grounds on the other side of the Route 7. Porete Ave, which borders the Kearny landfill and the New Jersey Meadowlands, surrounds most of the cemetery. At the time the cemetery was formed, however, it was situated among woods and farmland.

The exclusively Jewish cemetery consists of 12 to 21 divisions, each allocated to a Jewish society or synagogue, except for one area owned by Hudson County, which it uses as potter's field for its Jewish war veterans.

== History ==
Arlington Cemetery Services (the cemetery across the street) owned the land in 1896. It gained tax exempt status for cemetery use, but did not actually expand into the new area until about 1900. One of its constituent associations, the North Arlington Cemetery Association, owned by a Jew named Mintz, requested permission on November 8 1899 from the State of New Jersey to open the parcel as a cemetery, and having received permission on January 2 1900, bought the land from the larger association, and opened the first plots on the east end of the parcel. The oldest marker shows 1899, which predates the official opening of the cemetery.

Mintz then sold the cemetery to a Mr. Savage, who owned the West Arlington Association, which was then sold to a Mr. Cheplowitz, who died around December 1970. West Arlington Association owned the overall cemetery, but its sections were sold to about 20 other benevolent societies, most belonging to a synagogue or temple in the surrounding counties of Hudson, Bergen, and Essex.

Cheplowitz' son did not want to continue managing the cemetery, and agreed to allow a new association to buy him out in mid-1971. The new owners were known as either Israel Arlington Cemetery Services, or United Cooperative Cemetery Services.

== Layout ==
A solitary cemetery road divides the property roughly in half, with the older, southern/eastern half occupied mostly by Reform temples, Conservative synagogues, and secular organizations. Congregation Adas Emuno of Hoboken is the oldest association of the cemetery. This is their second cemetery (their first is fully abandoned), in use since the early twentieth century, possibly during the era of Mintz' ownership. Adas Emuno's section occupies the southeastern corner of the property.

Many of Newark's defunct Orthodox synagogues occupy the northern half. A local Conservative synagogue, Congregation B'nai Israel of Kearny and North Arlington, has space between the cemetery road and the Newark sections.

Rabbi Jacob Mendelson, the chief rabbi of Newark at the time that the Newark section was purchased, is buried close to the northern tip of the cemetery, along with many members of his extended family.

== Condition ==
The cemetery has a long history of neglect, dating back to the 1970s. At that time, the long-term owner-manager died, and the cemetery staff was furloughed to irregular work. A new association took over the cemetery, and promised to have full time staff five days a week, and to maintain the site well. However, by the late 1980s, it had fallen into disrepair and neglect again.

As of 2020 the cemetery is in very rough shape, with many fallen, sunken, or broken gravestones and grave vaults; dilapidated or missing gates and fences; sinkholes or animal burrows; and a crumbled office and maintenance building. The cemetery once had a full-time office and maintenance, but as its associated organizations aged and most closed down or moved, its use declined, and the office was abandoned. The office building is now crumbling, and there is no longer any permanent staff. In the late 1980s, a monument company, Sanford B. Epstein, Inc. (sometimes known as Kenilworth) took over management, maintenance, and interments on behalf of the associations, both active and defunct. The management company has done significant work to clean up and secure the location, though much work remains to be done, and individual graves are only repaired when families request the work and pay for it.

A brief video of the cemetery is shown in the opening montage for The Sopranos.

== See also ==
- List of cemeteries in New Jersey
- List of cemeteries in Hudson County, New Jersey
