= A Cantor's Tale =

- A Cantor's Tale promotional image
- Directed by: Erik Greenberg Anjou
- Produced by: Erik Greenberg Anjou
- Starring: Jacob Mendelson; Jackie Mason; Alan Dershowitz
- Cinematography: Sam Henriques
- Edited by: Karlyn Michelson
- Music by: Frank London
- Distributed by: Ergo Media Inc.
- Release date: July 25, 2005 (San Francisco Jewish Film Festival)
- Running time: 95 minutes
- Country: United States
- Language: English

A Cantor's Tale is a 2005 documentary by Erik Greenberg Anjou. The film profiles Jacob Mendelson, a practitioner of Jewish liturgical music (a cantor) who has dedicated his life to preserving the form's traditional vocal stylings.

== Plot ==
Anjou follows Mendelson around Borough Park, his old neighborhood in Brooklyn. Mendelson, who carries a tuning fork with him at all times, is prone to burst into song. During their journey through Borough Park, Anjou finds that the neighborhood has a fair number of bakers with vocal talents as good as their knishes.

Mendelson also recalls when cantors were as popular as baseball players. "They had groupies," he tells Anjou, a strong incentive for a chubby teenager in high school.

Mendelson's mother, who had been diagnosed with bipolar disorder, was almost obsessed that her son become a cantor. The film reveals an interesting link to celebrity on the part of Mendelson's father: the older Mendelson once co-owned a truck with the father of Steven Spielberg.

The movie's original title was Chazz'n, after the profiled cantor's sobriquet "Chazzan Jack Mendelson." It has also been titled A Cantor's Story.

== Subject ==
Mendelson grew up in the Borough Park neighborhood of Brooklyn. He was given the Hebrew name Yaakov Ben-Zion, after his grandfather, the rabbi of Newark between the world wars.

He has opera and cantorial degrees from Juilliard and Hebrew Union College (HUC) respectively. He has also taught at both HUC and Jewish Theological Seminary.

In 1979, he married Fredda M. Rakusin, a fellow Juilliard graduate, cantor, and opera singer.

Mendelson was preceded in his profession by a number of relatives, including a paternal uncle, Nathan, who was cantor at Montreal's Shaar Hashamayim for 35 years, an older brother Solomon "Tucky" Mendelson, and other members of the extended Mendelson family. Sol and Jacob were members of Moshe Koussevitzky's children's choir at Beth-El, and both were later presidents of the Cantors Assembly.
