= Congregation Adas Emuno (New Jersey) =

Reform Jewish synagogue in New Jersey, US

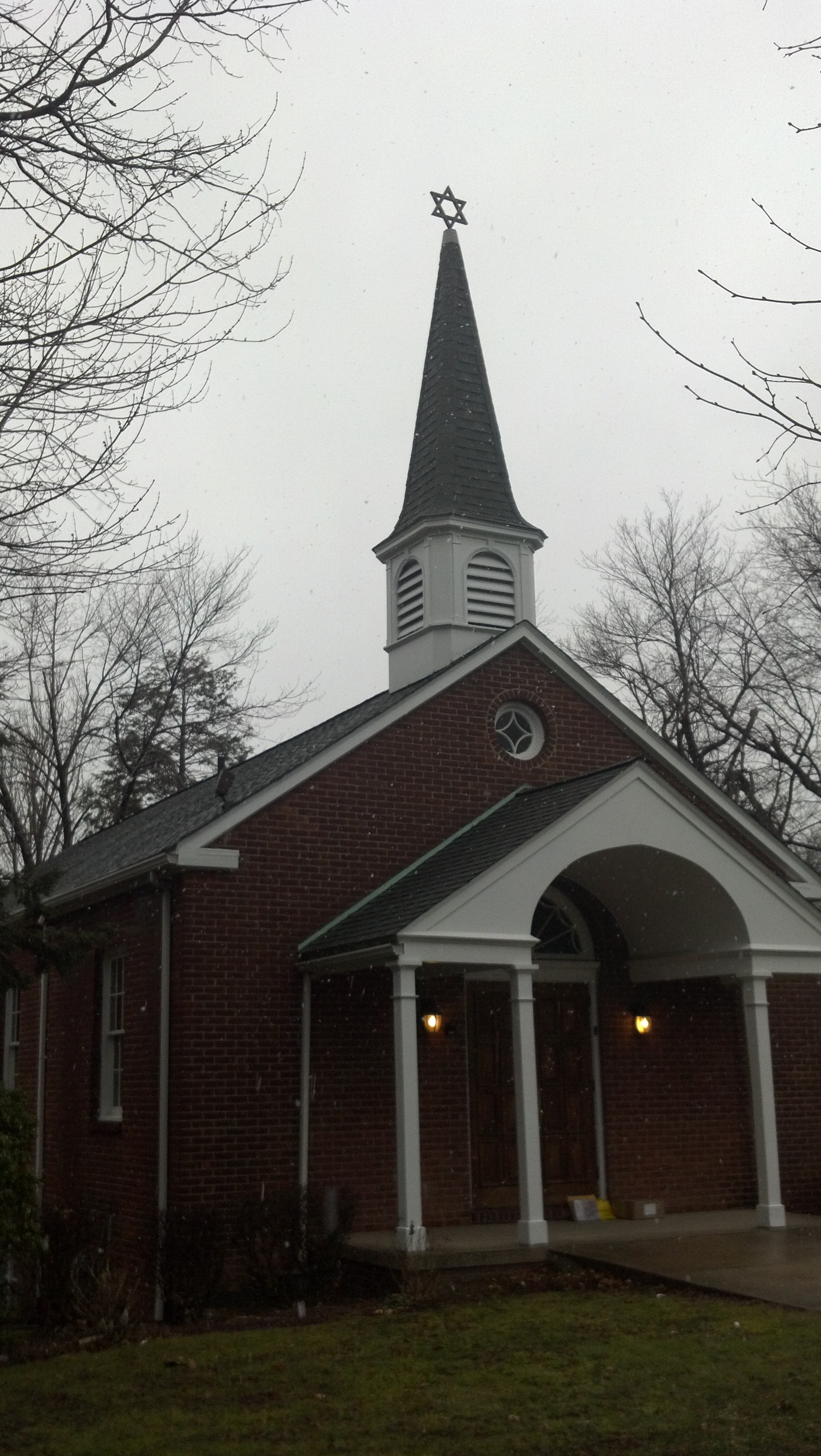
- Adas Emuno synagogue in 2013

- Location in Bergen County, New Jersey

Religion
- Affiliation: Reform Judaism
- Ecclesiastical or organizational status: Synagogue
- Status: Active

Location
- Location: Leonia, Bergen County, New Jersey
- Country: United States
- Interactive map of Congregation Adas Emuno
- Coordinates: 40°51′35″N 73°59′23″W

Architecture
- Type: Synagogue
- Established: 1871 (as a congregation)
- Completed: 1873 (in Hoboken); 1883 (in Hoboken); 1971 (in Leonia)
- Materials: Brick

Website
- adasemuno.org

Congregation Adas Emuno is a Reform Jewish congregation and synagogue in Leonia, Bergen County, New Jersey, in the United States.

== History ==
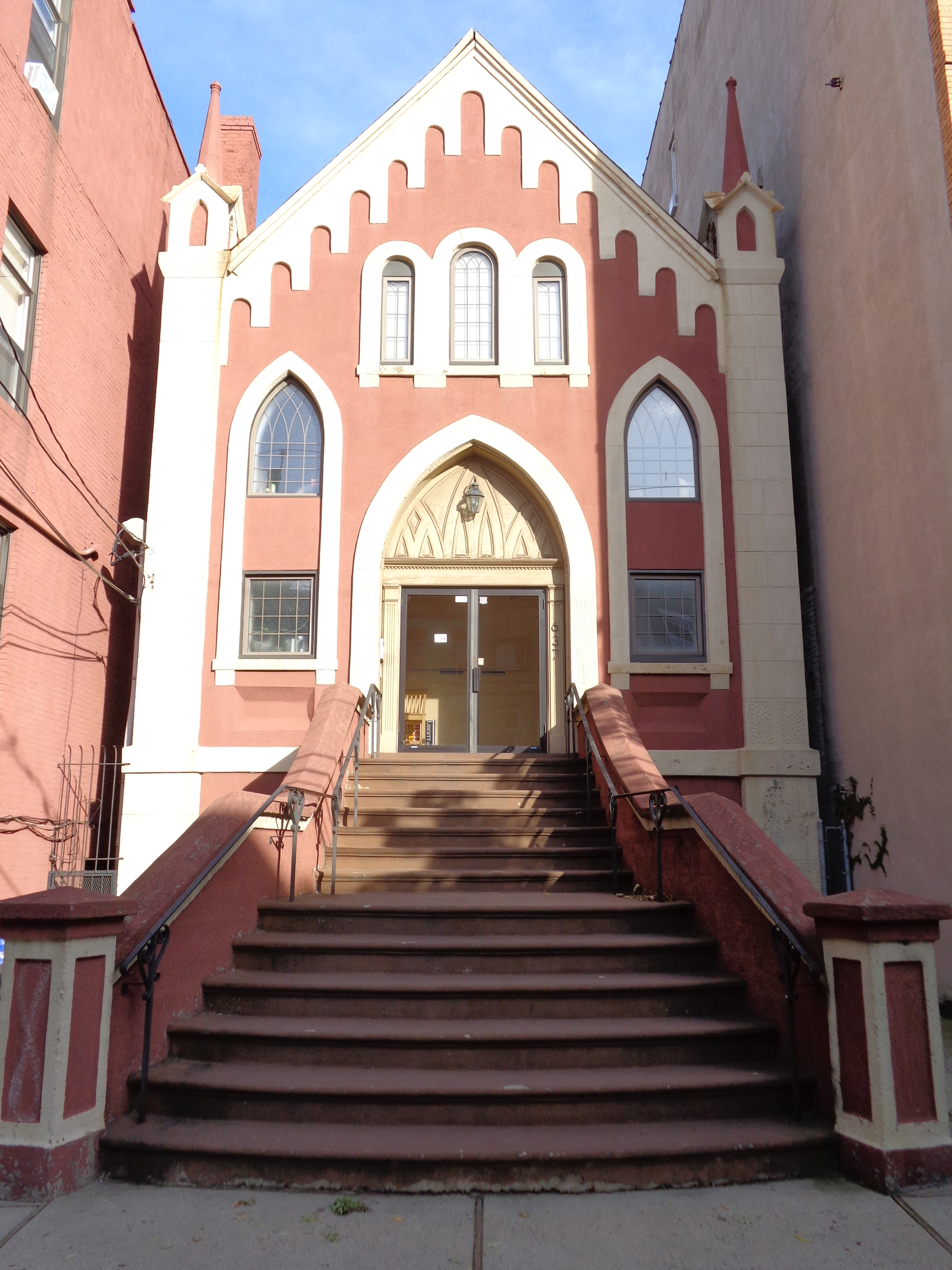
Former synagogue building at 637 Garden Street, Hoboken, built in 1883

The congregation was founded in Hoboken, New Jersey, in 1871. They moved into a new synagogue in 1873, and received a donation of a Torah scroll at that time. In 1883 they erected a small new synagogue building at 637 Garden Street, with a mix of Gothic Revival and Romanesque Revival styles. That building is the oldest synagogue building in New Jersey, though it was subsequently used for some years as a church, and is now a residential building.

In 1971, the congregation moved to Leonia, to a brick building purchased from the Holy Trinity Lutheran Church.

Adas Emuno owns two cemeteries. The older, smaller one is a small section of Hoboken Cemetery (but was originally part of the adjacent Flower Hill Cemetery). The larger, and slightly more recent cemetery is sited in North Arlington, NJ, across Belleville Turnpike from the Arlington Memorial Park. Adas Emuno may have been the first organization to use that cemetery, though many Jewish organizations opened additional sections within it afterwards. While the main gate for the cemetery shows Hebrew year 5669 (generally corresponding to 1909), there are gravestones dating as early as 1899 within the section.

== See also ==
- List of the oldest buildings in New Jersey
- United Synagogue of Hoboken
- Prince Street Synagogue
