= Dixon Mills =

Residential complex in Jersey City, New Jersey

Coordinates: 40.72113°N 74.05048°W

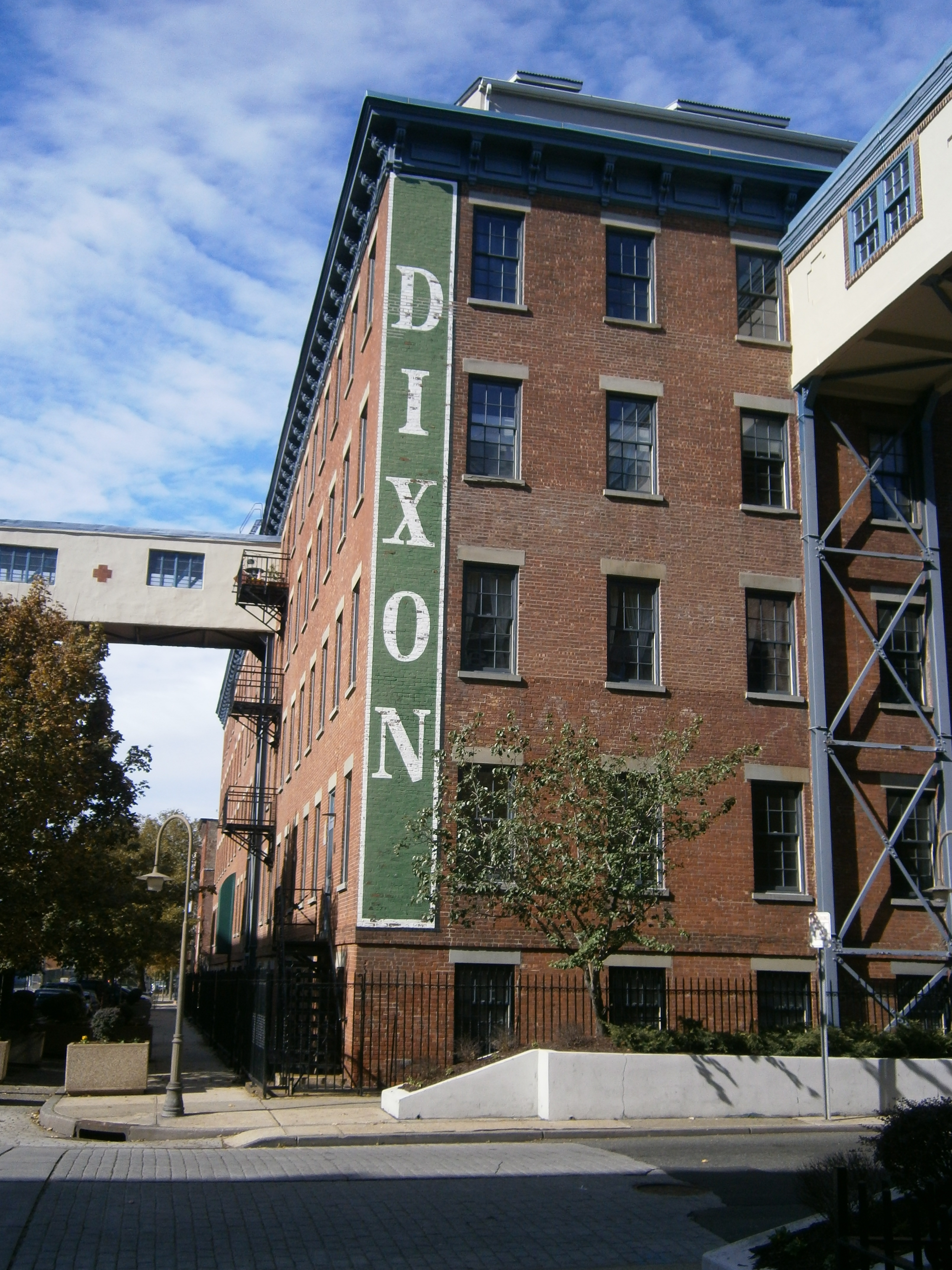
- Interactive map of Dixon Mills
- Country: United States
- State: New Jersey
- Time zone: Eastern (EST)
  - Summer (DST): Eastern (EDT)

Dixon Mills is a residential complex in Jersey City, New Jersey that uses the buildings of the former location of the Joseph Dixon Crucible Company, which was in use between 1847 and 1895. There is a small museum with artifacts from the building and its history in the lobby of the complex.

== History ==
Joseph Dixon moved his crucible factory, which was originally located in Salem, Massachusetts, to what is now the Van Vorst Park neighborhood of Historic Downtown, Jersey City, New Jersey in 1840. Over the years the company produced crucibles, pencils, crayons, stove polish and lubricants at this site.

In the mid-1980s the complex was developed into residences, preserving the structures as they were, including bridges between buildings. There is a small museum with artifacts from the building and its history in the lobby of the complex.

== See also ==
- Jersey Glass Company
- Whitlock Cordage
- The Beacon
- Hudson and Manhattan Railroad Powerhouse
