= Yaakov Ben Zion Mendelson =

Orthodox communal rabbi, Talmudist, Halachist, rabbinical author and scholar

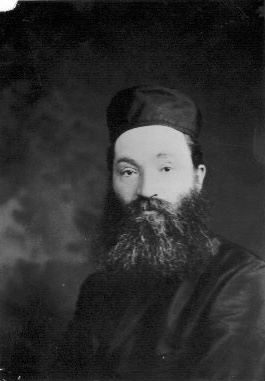

Personal life
- Born: Yaakov Ben Zion Morein; October 12–14, 1875 Kreitzburg, Russian Empire
- Died: August 5, 1941 (aged 65) Newark, New Jersey
- Buried: North Arlington Jewish Cemetery

Religious life
- Religion: Judaism

Yaakov Ben Zion Mendelsohn (Hebrew: יעקב בן ציון הכהן מענדעלסאן) (October 12–14, 1875 – August 5, 1941) (Note: The AJC Year Book gives a birth date of 12 October 1875. Mendelson's autobiography states that he was born on the first day of Sukoth 5736, which corresponds to 14 October 1875 (or late evening of 13 October).) was a renowned Russian-born Orthodox Jewish scholar, communal rabbi, Talmudist, Halachist, and rabbinical author (mechaber seforim).

== Early life ==
Mendelson was born Yaakov Ben Zion Morein in 1875, in Kreitzburg, part of the Vitebsk district of what was then Russia, to his parents Menachem (Yiddish: Mendel) and Beila Rochel Morein. (The town later changed to Latvian hands, and the German name became Latvian Krustpils. In 1962, it was also united with the town of Jēkabpils, across the Daugava River.from it, and are now known together as Jēkabpils).

His rigorous Talmudic education started at age 7, and culminated with semicha ordination from the Rabbi Yosef Rosen, the "Rogatchover Gaon," one of the rabbinic greats of the time. Morein met Rabbi Sholom Dovber Schneersohn ("Rashab") and his son, Rabbi Yosef Yitzchak Schneersohn ("Rayatz"), the fifth and sixth Rebbes of Chabad-Lubavitch as a teenager. It was Rashab who recommended he study with Rosen. Under the influence of Rashab and the Rogatchover, he adopted some Chabad practices, but remained primarily a Lithuanian-oriented rabbi.

Shortly after his ordination, he was betrothed to a cousin, Feiga Skuy, but his marriage was postponed when he was drafted into the Russian Army. The army was very harsh for Jewish soldiers, and commanders were well known for trying to break the Jews from their religion. Morein deserted.

After escaping Russia, he had several close calls evading Russian agents throughout Europe. He changed his surname to Mendelson ("Mendel's son,"), to make it harder for the government to track him.

== The British years ==
Eventually, Mendelson emigrated to London, England. At age 22, he found a position as Rabbi and Dayan of Leeds, and of the ‘Chevras Torah’ shul there. He sent for his cousin Feiga, and they married in Leeds, in 1898.

In 1905, he took a new position as rabbi of Gateshead, and later, as rabbi of Glasgow, Scotland. In Glasgow, Mendelson demonstrated his community leadership and concern for its well-being countless times. In two instances, he thwarted cartels controlling certain commercial aspects of ritual, to keep prices stable. (See details in Communal advocacy and disputes.)

== Chief Rabbi of Newark ==
When war broke out, Mendelson's son Chaim was old enough to be drafted. After Mendelson's experience with the Russian Army, he wanted to avoid that, and relocated to the United States in 1915. He would spend the rest of his life, personally and professionally, in Newark, New Jersey. In 1917, he was appointed Rabbi of Congregation Adath Y'Israel Mishnayes, a synagogue on Price Street. He moved to Congregation Tifereth Israel of Brisk d’Lita in 1919. In 1921 he was appointed as Chief Rabbi of Newark, with primary jurisdiction over matters of Shechita and Kashrus; he held the position until his death.

Mendelson changed synagogue positions several times, leading Congregation Adas Yisroel, then Chevra B'nai Jacob Anshe Galicia, and finally founding his own shul, Congregation Beis Hamedrash Hagadol. To do so, he bought the defunct synagogue building formerly run by Rabbi Meyer Isserman. He opened an expanded building next door on August 14, 1934, in a large ceremony attended by hundreds of locals along with rabbis from Passaic, West New York, the Bronx, Brooklyn, and Philadelphia, and members of the New York press. The new congregation was commonly known as the Bergen Street Shul.

Distinguished for his scholarship and devotion to the Jewish community, Mendelson was a member of Knesseth ha-Rabbanim (the Assembly of Hebrew Orthodox Rabbis of America and Canada), where he was considered an expert in kashruth. He became a leader of the organization, and was featured at or presided over many of its conventions:

- 11th convention, addressing issues of cooperation among Orthodox rabbis, improving education, marital law, religious courts, and kosher meat,
- 13th convention, he gave the keynote address (10 February 1930), focusing on unity across rabbinic organizations, Sabbath observance, Palestine, kashruth, Prohibition, and alien registration.
- 15th convention, presided, and elected vice president of the organization.
- At the September 10, 1940 convention session, he made an impassioned plea, to all of American Jewry, for the support of war refugees.

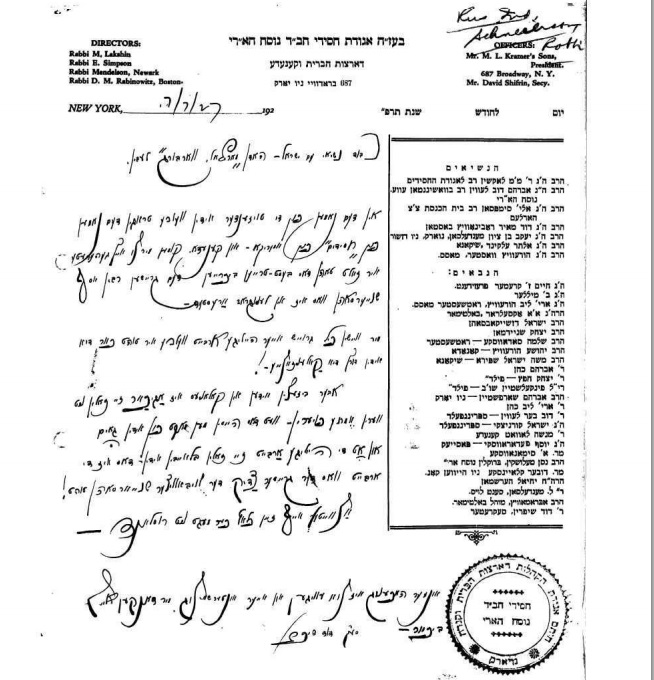

Because of his close relationship with Rashab and Rayatz, Mendelson was a director and vice-president of their American organization, the Association of Chabad Hasidim Nusach Ari of the United States and Canada. His name appeared on their letterthead in two places.

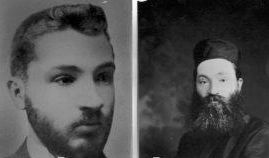
Mendelson as a young man and as a senior rabbi.

== Legacy ==
Mendelson died in 1941, leaving a widow, five sons, four daughters and twelve grandchildren. Another son, Shmuel Dov, died in a scalding accident in Gateshead in 1905. Interment is at North Arlington Jewish Cemetery, whose Newark Orthodox section was purchased and organized under his aegis.

His synagogue, Beis Hamedrash Hagadol, continued to function, until an eminent domain seizure for the construction Interstate 78. Both the synagogue and Mendelson's house, one block east at 349 Chadwick Avenue, were condemned.

He was the personal Talmud teacher to a young Gedalia Dov Schwartz, who became a leading American rabbi in New York and Chicago.

Mendelson was an author of Talmudic and Rabbinic works. He wrote six volumes of scholarship:

- Sha’arei Tzion (Leeds, 1903) - on the Talmud (with approbation from Rabbi Shlomo HaKohen, Dayan of Vilna)
- Sefer Hatzid (Leeds, 1904) - laws relating to ritual slaughter
- Midrash Yaavetz (Glasgow, 1911) - Halacha and Aggadah on the Book of Genesis (Note: Midrash Yaavetz had approbations from Rabbi Nosson Halevi Bamberger of Würzburg; Rabbi Menachem Dovber Dagutski of Manchester; Rabbi Refoel Zilberman of Tzfas; Rabbi Eliyahu Posek of Alapolia in Russia; Rabbi Eliezer Dan Yachai of Lutzin and Rabbi Shlomo Yaakov Koton of Leshenov, and with a warm letter from Rabbi Akiva HaCohen Matlon of Heina in Minsk province, at the time part of Russia.)
- Mishnas Yaavetz on Chagiga (Leeds, 1903) a summary of the final rulings of this volume of Talmud Bavli
- Mishnas Yaavetz (1928) an anthology of three previously unpublished books by the author
  - Vol. One on androgyny
  - Vol. Two of Talmudic novellae
  - Vol. Three of responsa

Many of Mendelson's descendants took leadership positions in national Jewish organizations and local Jewish communities; see Relatives, below.

One of his grandchildren claims to have a collection of zemiros, Sabbath meal devotional songs, composed by his grandfather.

== Relatives ==
Mendelson's son Harry and his descendants reverted to the original family surname of Morein, though other family members continued to use Mendelson. Harry Morein was a founder of the Young Israel of Newark, and an early advocate to change New Jersey's Sunday blue laws, forbidding commerce on Sunday.

Today, he has many descendants involved in communal life at the national and local levels, including kashruth administration at the Orthodox Union and the Fairfield, Connecticut kosher supervision agency (grandson and namesake Yaakov Mendelson), and the teaching faculty of Yeshiva University's Manhattan Talmudical Academy High School (great-grandson Boruch Pesach Mendelson), and cantorial leadership (see below).

He arranged for a cousin, Rabbi Dovid Menachem Morein, to come to Gateshead as the town's first Melamed. Morein's son Wolf was rabbi of the North London Shul, while his daughter Bluma married Rabbi Gedalia Schneider, Rosh Yeshiva of London's Yeshiva Toras Emes ("Schneider's Yeshiva"). It was the only Yeshiva in London of the classic Lithuanian mold, and many of its top students moved on to Gateshead, Bluma's hometown, to become early members of the Gateshead kollel in the 1940s.

Mendelson's son, Cantor Nechemya "Chemmy" (Nathan) Mendelson was a founding member and president (1951-1954) of the Cantors Assembly. He served as Chazzan of Montreal's Congregation Shaar Hashomayim from 1938 to 1973. Nathan's son, David Mendelson, continued as an assistant cantor at the synagogue for many years.

Two grandchildren, brothers Jacob "Jackie" Mendelson and Solomon, or Sol, "Tucky" Mendelson have been presidents of the Cantors Assembly. Sol served in 1987-1989, while Jackie served in 2003-2004. Sol had multiple additional roles in the organization, including Programming Chair, Journal Editorial Board member, journal article author. He led many events on behalf of the Assembly, including:

- 1983: recruitment seminar at University of Hartford Hartt School of Music
- 1987: annual convention
- 1996: annual convention
- 1992: lay meeting
- 1984-1988: committee membership on the approach to Hazanut
- 1989: joint project with National Coalition Supporting Soviet Jewry
- First Gulf War: Israeli support trips (together with brother Jackie), and organization of the trips
- Shoah remembrance project

In addition to Rabbi Mendelson's descendants, several other close relatives by marriage had significant impact on the Newark kehila, mostly originating with his support.

- Louis Skui (later Sky) was Mendelson's brother-in-law and chief shochet of Newark. Upon Mendelson's death, due to the previous dispute with Rabbi Konvitz, Sky was unable to work as a shochet. He opened Sky Hebrew Books (later SkyBook), a large supplier of books and etrogs to congregations across the United States for over 50 years.
- Joseph Gross was president of Mendelson's Bergen Street Shul, administrator of the Mendelson-lead Vaad Hakashruth, and later mechutan to the Mendelsons, after the marriage of children Samuel Gross and Leesa Mendelson. In turn, Samuel was later a president of the shul, in the 1940s and 1950s.

== Communal advocacy and disputes ==
In Glasgow, Mendelson defied business interests to bring down communal costs for Passover Matzah and Mikvah use. At one point, to prevent price gouging, he rented the production facilities of the Consolidated Biscuit company, kashered it for Passover production, and ran Matzah production over one weekend. This kept prices for matzah reasonable, and caused the prior bakery cartel to lose all business for the year.

In Newark, he published a controversial ruling regarding the permissibility, under certain conditions, of using a Shochet who is not Sabbath-observant. The opinion is cited and argued against by Rabbi Shimon Shkop.

In 1921, he succeeded Rabbi Dov Ber Halperin as the kashruth authority for Newark, on consensus of most local rabbis, ritual slaughterers, lay leaders, and kashruth supervisors in the city. The position included responsibility for Jewish slaughterhouses, butchers, and the kosher operations of Swift & Co., and effectively made him chief Orthodox rabbi of the city. Around 1925, another rabbi, Joseph Konvitz, moved to the city and created a rival kosher supervision service. He won the Swift & Co. kosher division's contract, displacing the incumbent city kashruth agency, and attempted to become the sole kashruth authority for Newark. Many noted rabbis of the day were involved in this dispute, including Rabbis Abraham Kook, Moshe Mordechai Epstein, Avrohom Dov Ber Kahana, Joseph Rosen (the Rogotchaver Gaon), Moses Margolies (RAMAZ), and Velvele (Gavriel Zev) Margolis.

The two main parties and their organizations brought allegations, rebuttals, and counterallegations against each other. Konvitz filed a lawsuit in religious court (Beth Din), while Mendelson got a consensus of leading rabbis to back his position. There resulted a permanent rift in the city over rabbinate, with competing Vaadei Kashruth. The conflict lasted until Mendelson's death in 1941. Thereafter, Konvitz led the remaining kosher supervision in the city until his own death three years later.
