= Whitlock Cordage =

Development in New Jersey, US

Coordinates: 40.7150°N 74.0644°W

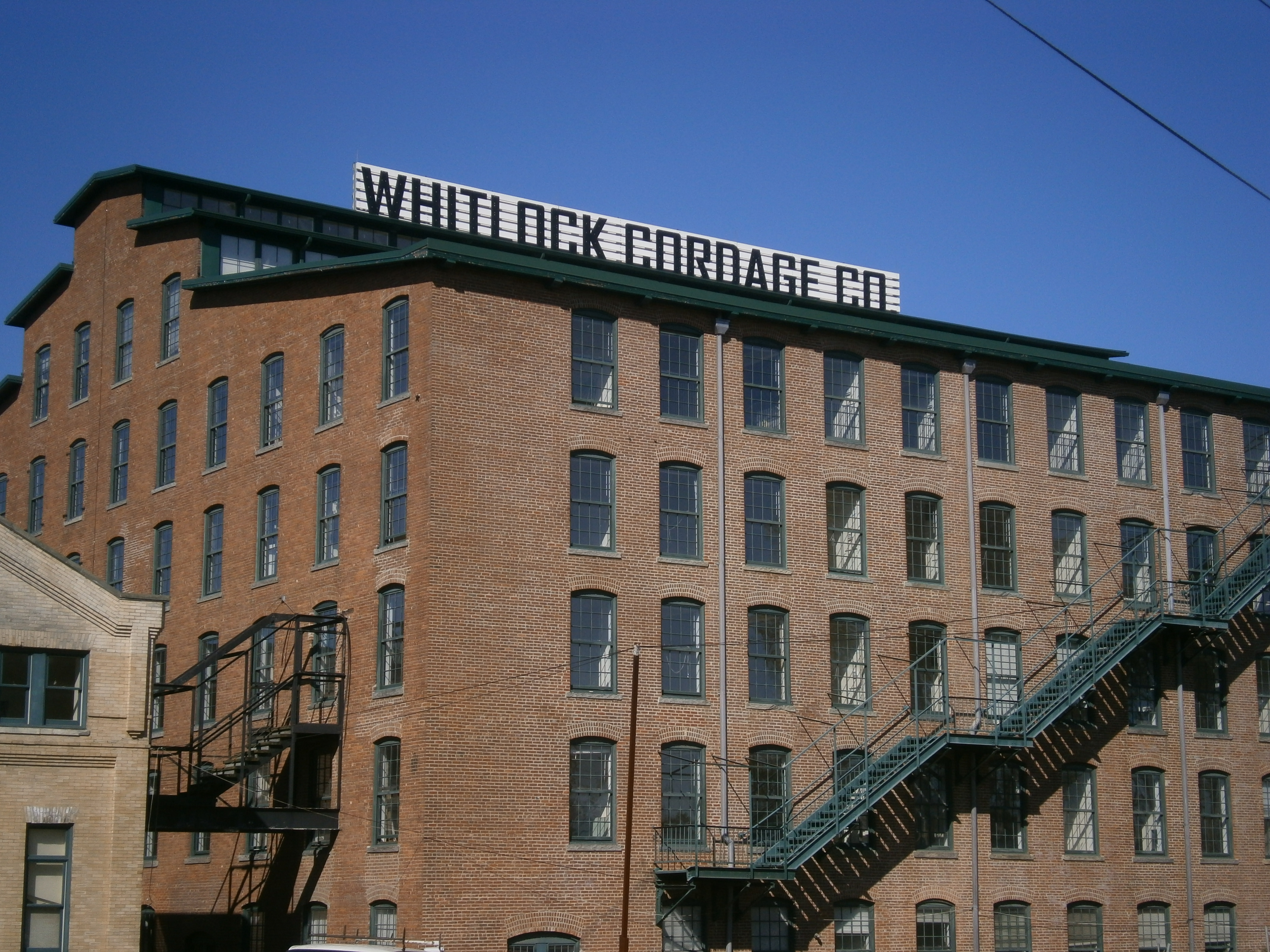
Original buildings

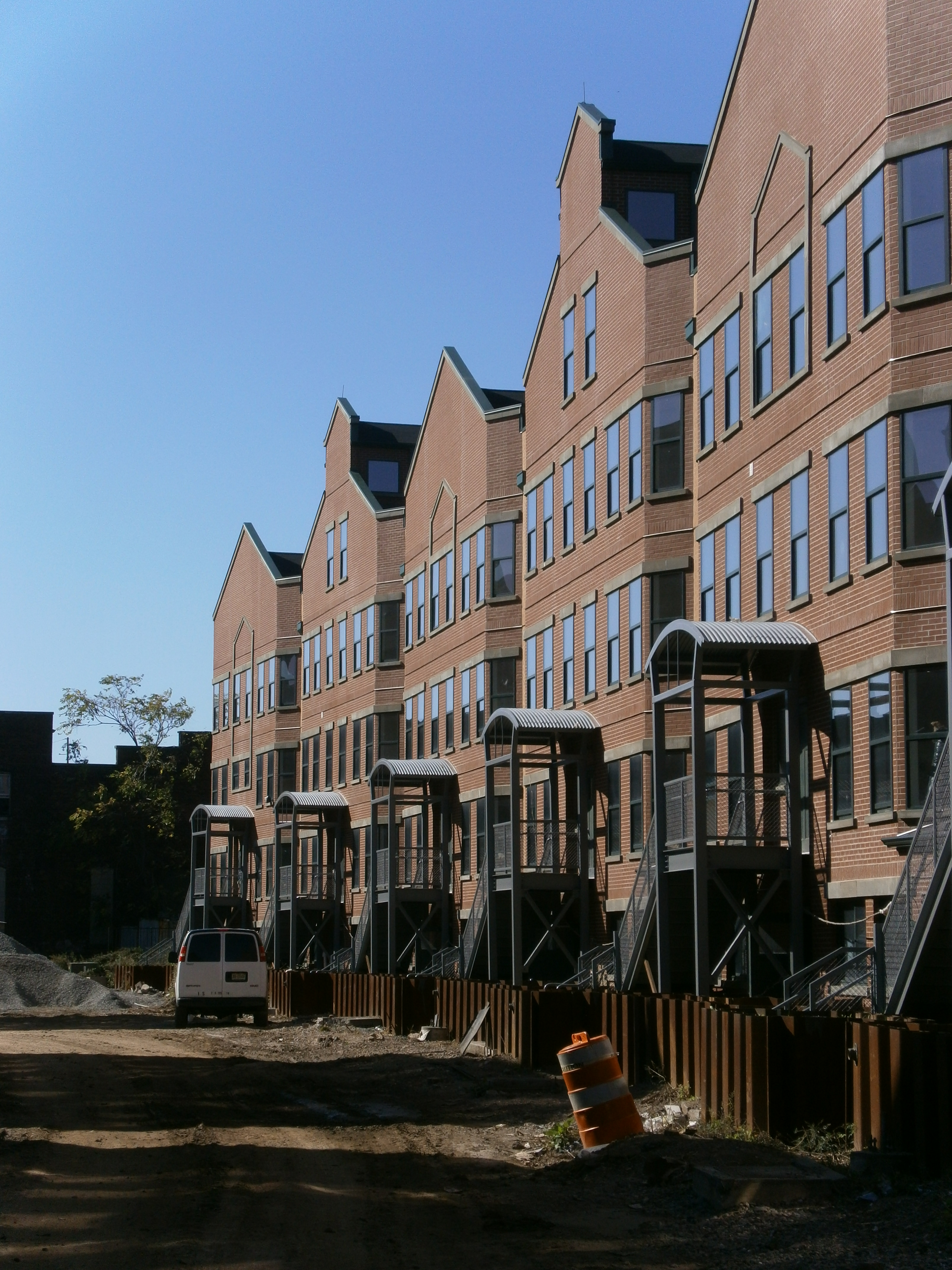
New buildings

Whitlock Cordage is a former industrial complex that has been renovated for residential and commercial use. It is located along the banks of the since-filled Morris Canal in the Lafayette Section of Jersey City, New Jersey.

The older buildings were originally constructed in 1860 as part of the Passaic Zinc Works, with the later buildings constructed by Whitlock Cordage in and after 1905 on a seven-acre site. Whitlock manufactured what many considered to be the world's strongest rope.

The building later became a sweatshop. In 2003 a federal bankruptcy judge had ordered demolition of the property to allow for its resale. Ultimately, the Housing Trust of America agreed to purchase the property and preserve the structures. The project included adaptive reuse of existing buildings as well as new construction and includes a total of 240 affordable and market rate apartments.

The nearby Berry Lane Park is the largest municipal park, and was completed in 2016.

After years of delays the project resumed construction in September 2018.

== See also ==
- The Beacon
- Dixon Mills
- Hudson and Manhattan Railroad Powerhouse
- Operation Bid Rig
