= Arlington Memorial Park =

Cemetery in Kearny, New Jersey

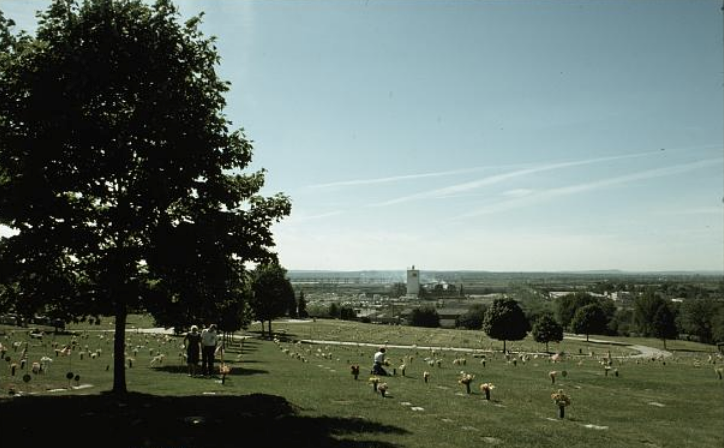
- Memorial Day 1977
- Interactive map of Arlington Memorial Park

Details
- Location: 748 Schuyler Avenue, Kearny, New Jersey 07032
- Country: United States
- Coordinates: 40.77294°N 74.13342°W
- Website: www.arlingtoncemeterynj.com
- Find a Grave: Arlington Memorial Park

Arlington Memorial Park is a cemetery located mostly within the Arlington section of Kearny in Hudson County, New Jersey, on Schuyler Avenue.

Prior to its creation the ground was owned by Julius Pratt, who later negotiated the development of the "attractive and picturesque" cemetery.

The large cemetery contains thousands of graves, many of early settlers of Hudson County, including some remains relocated from the graveyard at Old Bergen Church, and from the many Scots immigrants to Kearny. There are also over 500 American Civil War veteran gravesites, including those of Drummer Boy Willie McGee and Medal of Honor recipient James McIntosh. The town was once site the Home for Disabled Soldiers, an old soldiers' home closed in 1932.

The company also owned a plot in North Arlington, across Belleville Turnpike from its main grounds. It was approved by the State of New Jersey for cemetery expansion, but Arlington Service Association decided not to use it. Instead, a Jewish benevolent association previously affiliated with Arlington bought it and created a new cemetery, North Arlington Jewish Cemetery.

== See also ==
- List of cemeteries in Hudson County, New Jersey
- Kearny Riverbank Park
