= Jersey City YMCA =

- U.S. National Register of Historic Places
- New Jersey Register of Historic Places
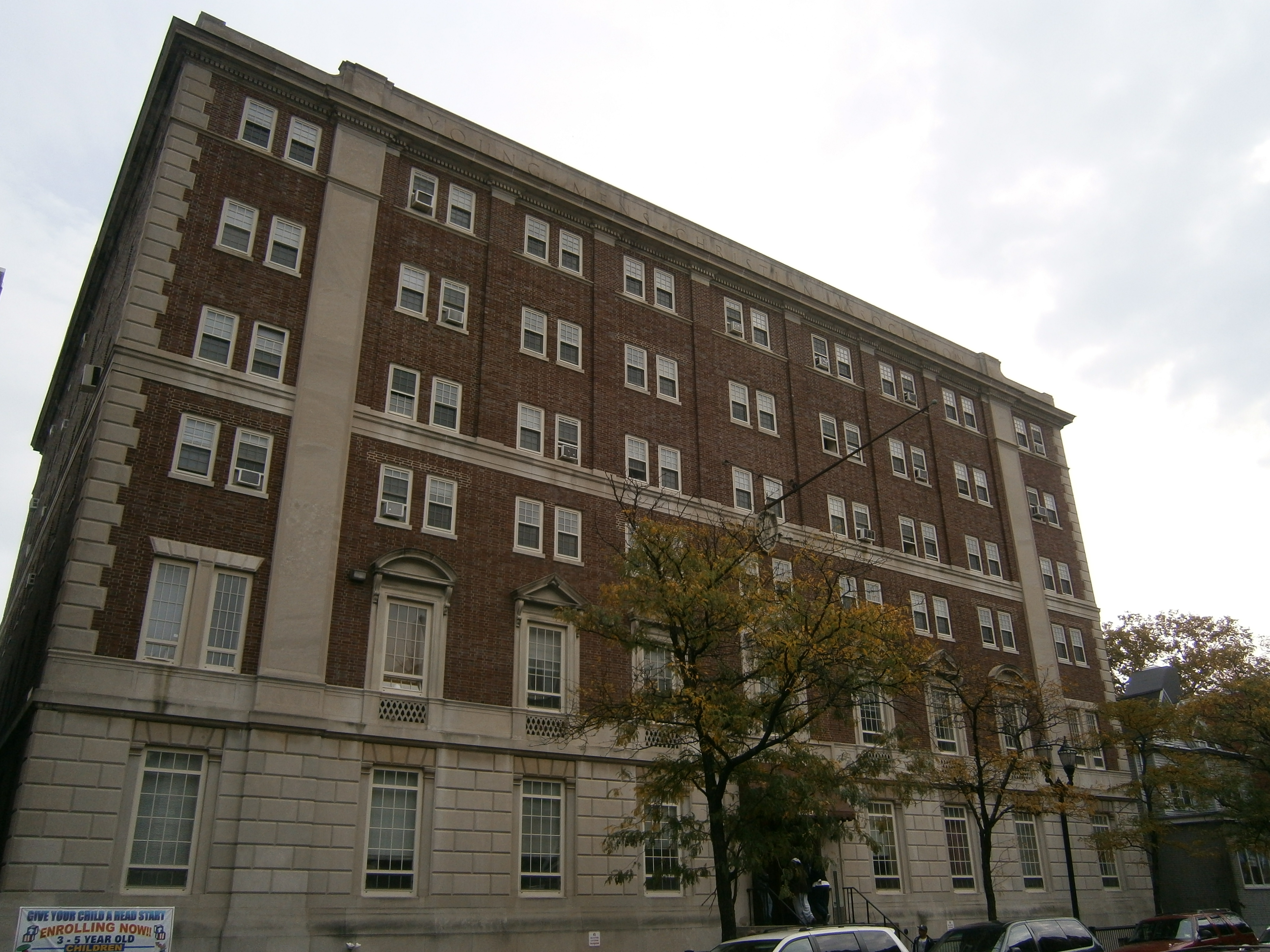

- Location within Hudson County, New Jersey Location within New Jersey Location within the United States
- Location: 654 Bergen Avenue, Jersey City, New Jersey
- Coordinates: 40°43′17″N 74°4′19″W
- Area: 3 acres (1.2 ha)
- Built: 1924
- Architect: John F. Jackson
- Architectural style: Classical Revival, Renaissance
- NRHP reference No.: 99001314
- NJRHP No.: 129

Significant dates
- Added to NRHP: November 12, 1999
- Designated NJRHP: September 29, 1999

The Jersey City YMCA, is located in Bergen Section of Jersey City, Hudson County, New Jersey, United States. The YMCA building was added to the National Register of Historic Places on November 12, 1999. The building is an example of an early twentieth century Renaissance Revival style. Built in 1923, in 1995 the building ceased to be used by the YMCA and was converted into affordable housing.

== See also ==
- Bergen-Lafayette
- Bergen Section, Jersey City
- National Register of Historic Places listings in Hudson County, New Jersey
