= United Synagogue of Hoboken =

The United Synagogue of Hoboken
- The synagogue in 2026

- Location in Hudson County, Hudson County, New Jersey

Religion
- Affiliation: Conservative Judaism
- Ecclesiastical or organisational status: Synagogue
- Leadership: Rabbi Robert Scheinberg
- Status: Active

Location
- Location: 115-117 Park Avenue, Hoboken, New Jersey
- Country: United States
- Coordinates: 40°44′18.5″N 74°1′59.5″W

Architecture
- Architects: Max J. Beyer; Radner, Usdin and Taub
- Type: Synagogue
- Style: Exotic Revival; Gothic Revival; Romanesque Revival
- Completed: 1915

Website
- hobokensynagogue.org
- United Synagogue of Hoboken
- U.S. National Register of Historic Places
- New Jersey Register of Historic Places
- Area: less than one acre
- NRHP reference No.: 08000563
- NJRHP No.: 4421

Significant dates
- Added to NRHP: June 27, 2008
- Designated NJRHP: May 6, 2008

The United Synagogue of Hoboken is a Conservative synagogue in Hoboken, Hudson County, New Jersey, in the United States.

== History ==
In 1946 The Hoboken Jewish Center and The Star of Israel Synagogue merged to form The United Synagogue of Hoboken. Originally, Moses Montefiore Synagogue had been invited to join the merger, but it declined when it learned that there would be mixed seating for religious services.

== Architecture ==
The 1915 building of the Congregation Star of Israel is among the oldest synagogue buildings in New Jersey. It was closed for two decades before being reopened in 1989. It continues in use by the congregation. A thorough external restoration was completed in 2009 with the assistance of a $280,000 matching grant from the New Jersey Historic Trust. The synagogue is listed on both the NJ Register of Historic Places and the National Register of Historic Places.

== See also ==
- National Register of Historic Places listings in Hudson County, New Jersey
- Congregation Adas Emuno (New Jersey)
- New Jersey Churchscape
