= McGinley Square =

Populated place in Hudson County, New Jersey, US

Coordinates: 40°43′31″N 74°4′5″W

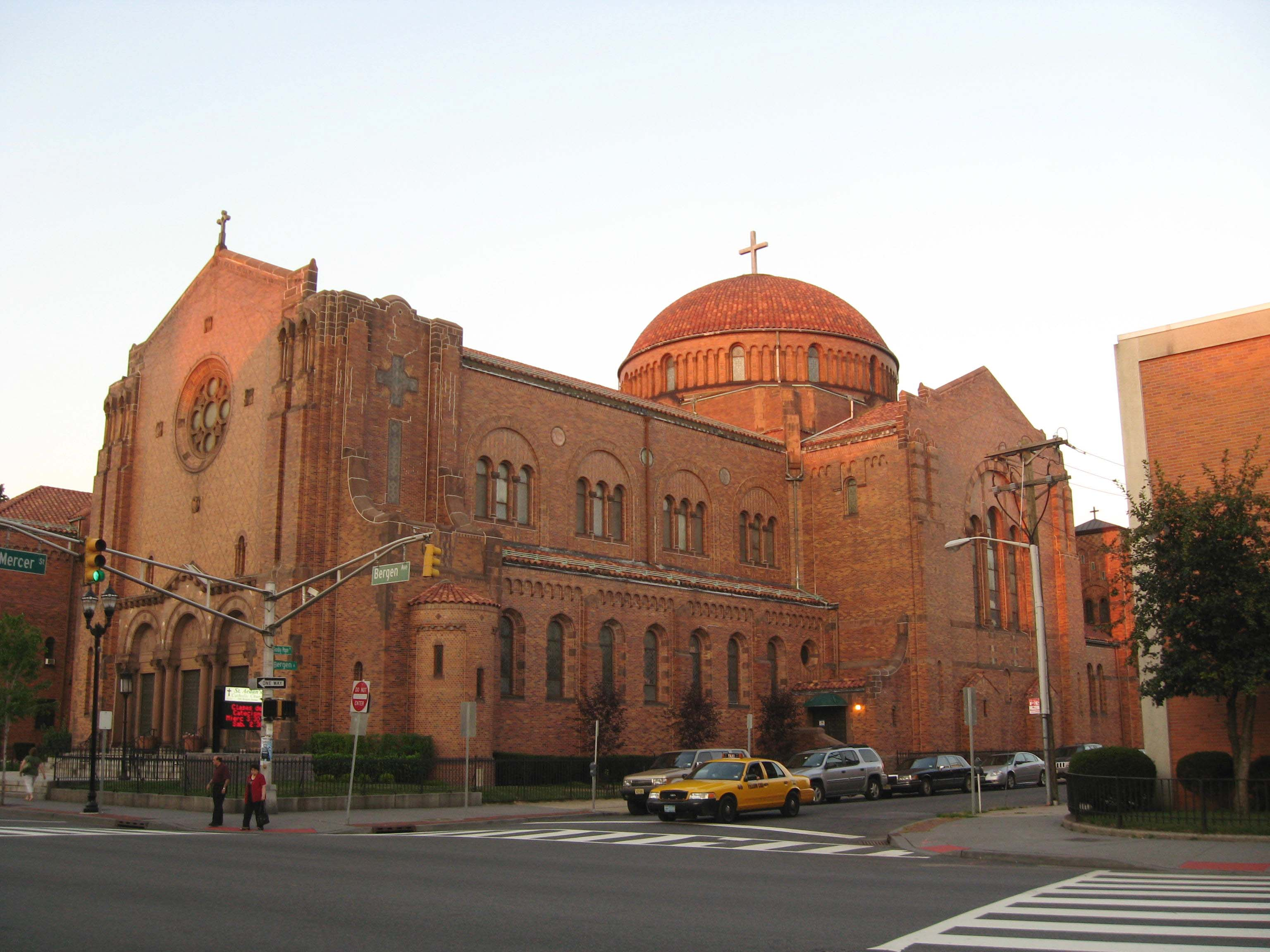
St Aedan's Church

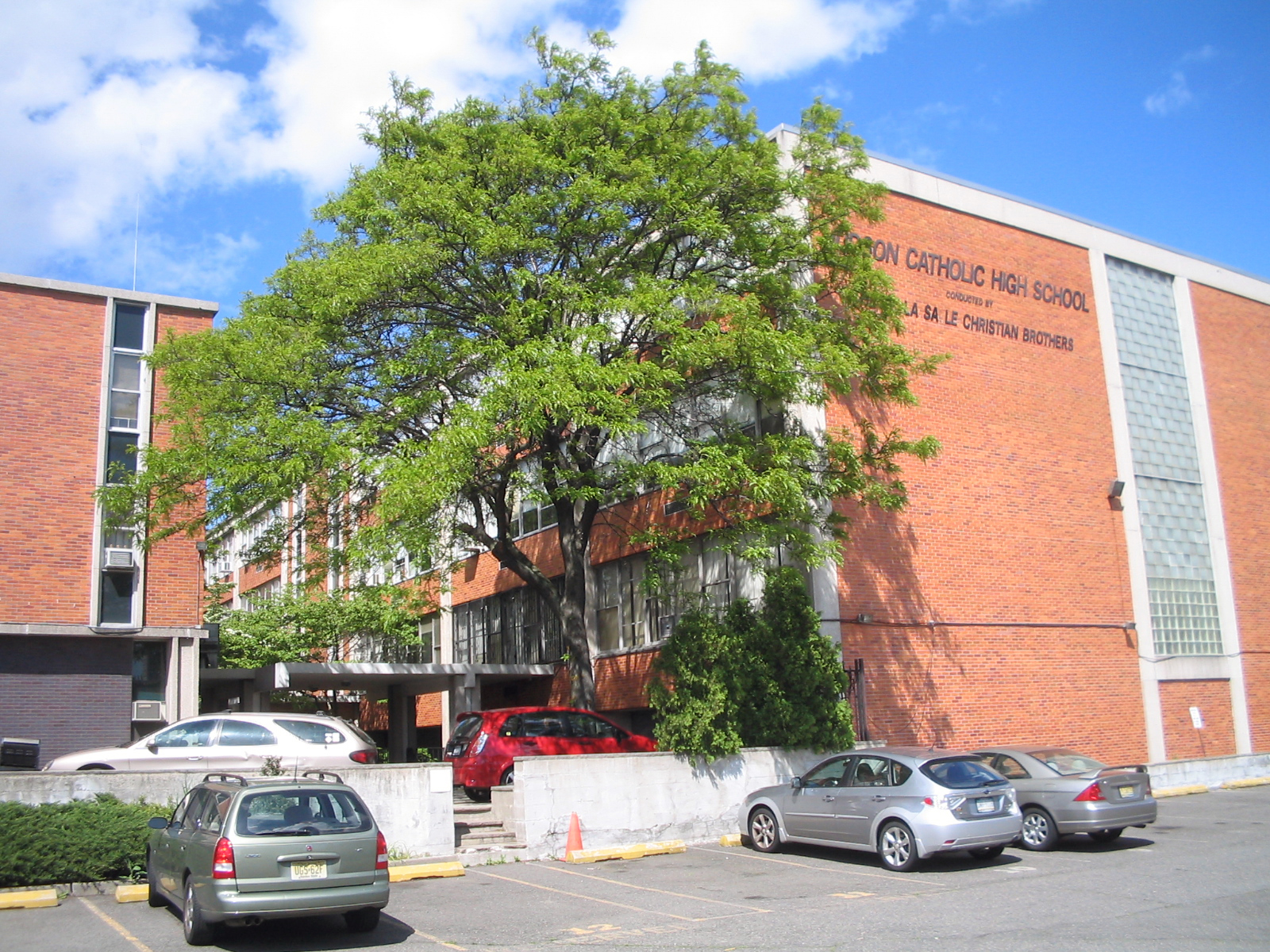
Hudson Catholic

McGinley Square is a neighborhood in Jersey City, New Jersey, located near the middle of the city, south of Journal Square. The square itself is at the intersection of two of the city's major thoroughfares, Montgomery Street (which runs from Downtown at Exchange Place to West Side), and Bergen Avenue (which runs between Greenville and Journal Square).

View of McGinley Square

The area was named after Monsignor Roger McGinley, the builder of St. Aedans Church. Hudson Catholic Regional High School, the Jersey City Armory, the Jersey City YMCA, St. Mark Coptic Orthodox Church, and Bergen Square are all within a short walk from the square.

By the late 2010s, the area around the square was planned for development. and was chosen by the U.S. Department of Housing and Urban Development to receive a $250,000 Choice Neighborhoods grant to explore ways to develop the area into a mixed-use neighborhood. Residents formed the McGinley Square Redevelopment Plan, which called for the construction of affordable and workforce housing, retail outlets, restaurants, and entertainment facilities. Large blocks of the neighborhood belong to Saint Peter's University, which in March 2016 received approval to build a 21-story mixed use tower at 688-700 Montgomery Street, which included three levels of retail and entertainment space, including a movie theater and 300-car parking garage. Plans were mired in a controversy regarding the use of eminent domain, but were nonetheless approved. Construction had been set to begin in August 2012, with completion set for 2016; as of 2018 it had not yet begun.

Several community organizations are active in the McGinley Square area. Bergen Communities United is a non-profit organization responsible for community planning in McGinley Square and the neighborhoods immediately to the south. The McGinley Square Partnership is a business improvement district, with local business owners using dues and NJ Urban Enterprise Zone funds for improvements to the commercial area. The Highland Avenue Block Association advocates for residents' interests.
