= Fairmount Apartments (Jersey City, New Jersey) =

- U.S. National Register of Historic Places
- New Jersey Register of Historic Places
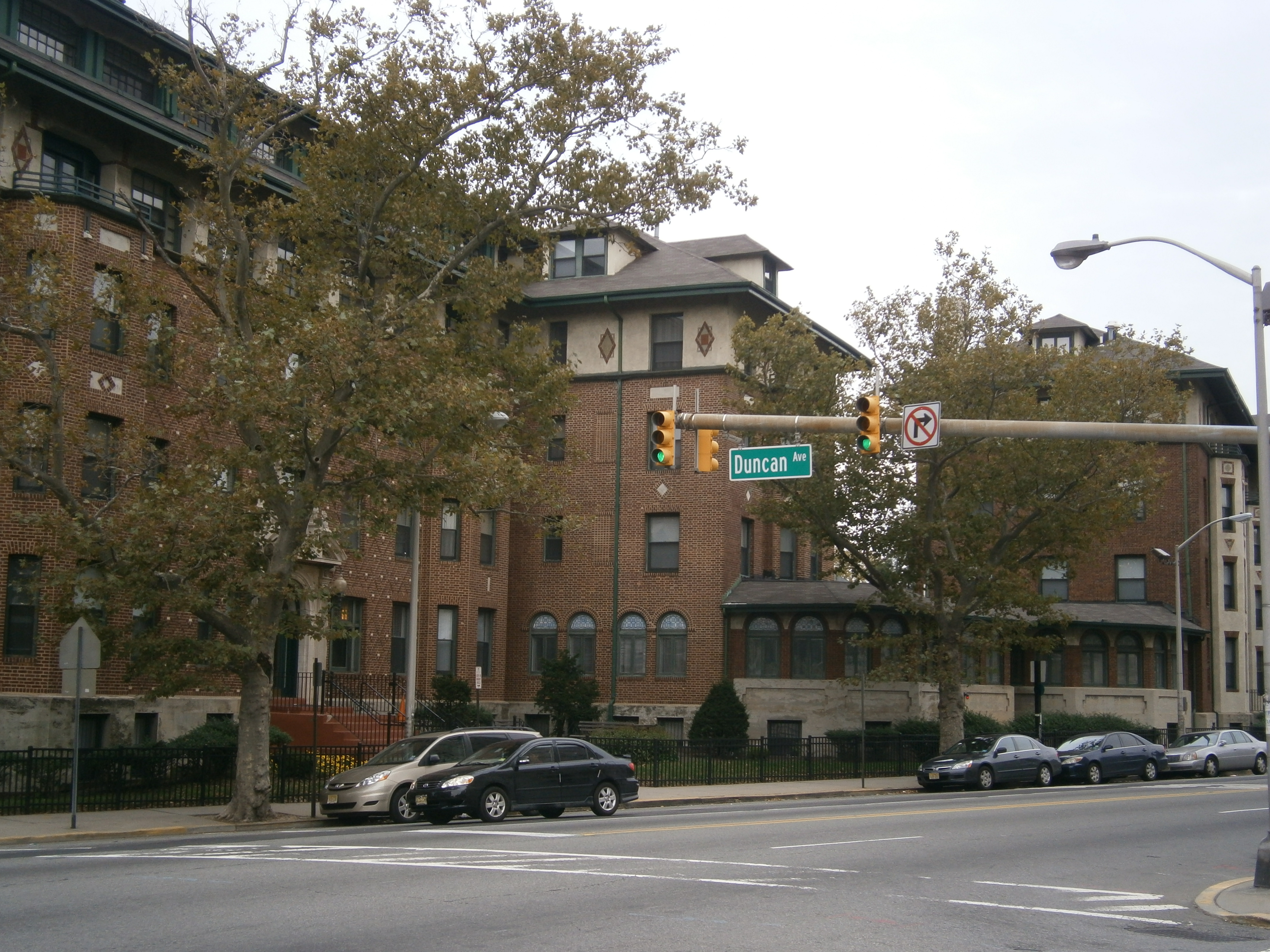

- Location within Hudson County, New Jersey Location within New Jersey Location within the United States
- Location: 2595 Kennedy Boulevard, Jersey City, New Jersey
- Coordinates: 40°43′33″N 74°4′23″W
- Area: 0.6 acres (0.24 ha)
- Built: 1909
- Architect: Newman and Harris
- Architectural style: Classical Revival, Bungalow/Craftsman
- NRHP reference No.: 95000183
- NJRHP No.: 1480

Significant dates
- Added to NRHP: March 3, 1995
- Designated NJRHP: December 9, 1994

The Fairmount Apartments, also known as the Grand Lady of Jersey City, are located in Jersey City, Hudson County, New Jersey, United States. The Apartments were added to the National Register of Historic Places on March 3, 1995. The Apartments are an example of an early twentieth century Arts and Crafts style apartments. The building consists of two L-shaped 4 1/2-story brick-and-concrete structures connected by a 1-story structure.

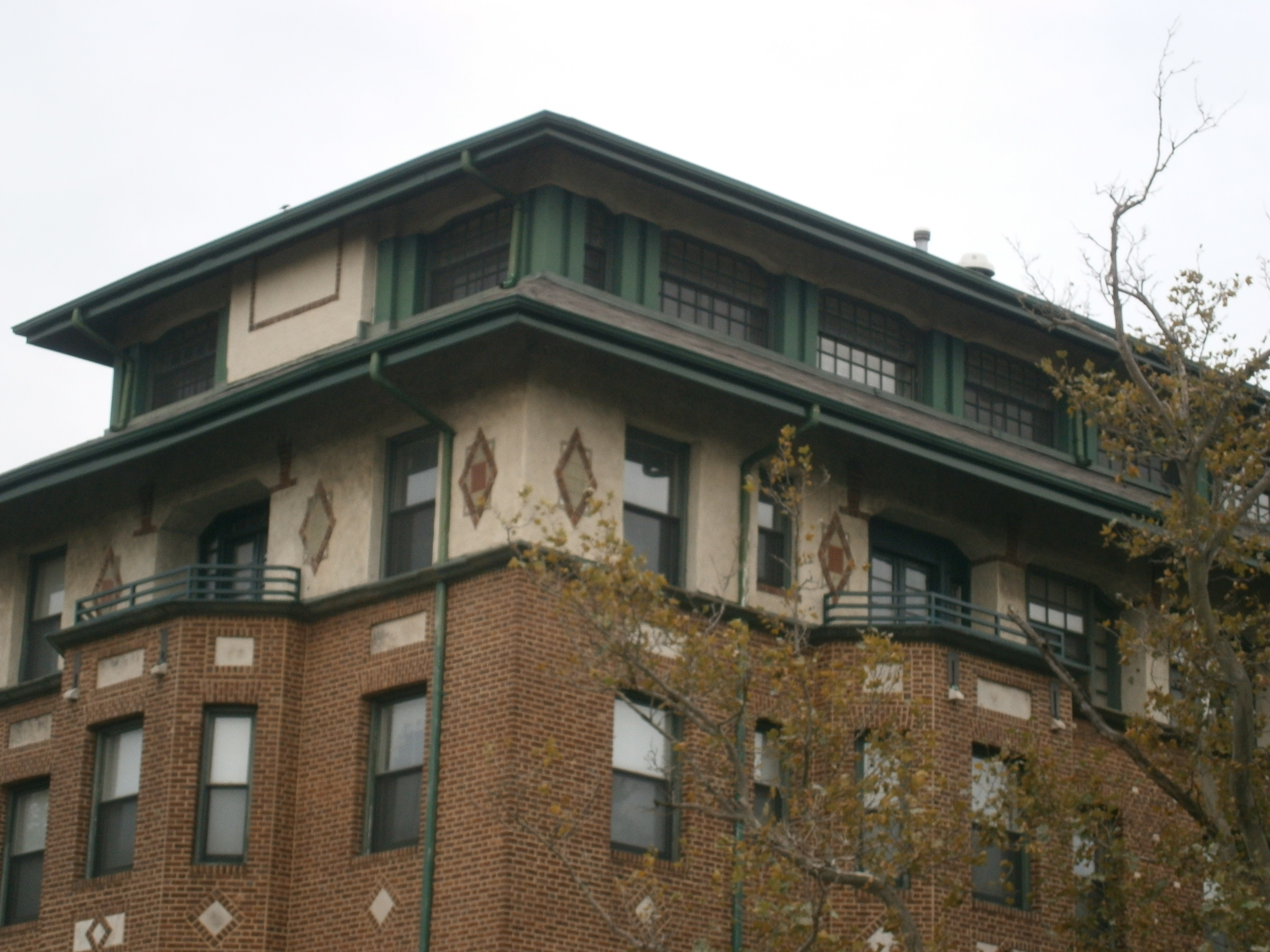
Arts and Crafts architectural detail

== History ==
The Fairmount Apartments were designed by the firm of Newman and Harris. The eastern section was constructed in 1909 and the western section was built in 1912. There were 33 apartments in each section. The building was purchased in 1962 by Father Divine. The building was renovated in 1995 and currently has 59 apartments of senior residences. As of 2025, there are plans to renovate the buildings.

== See also ==
- Bergen Section, Jersey City
- National Register of Historic Places listings in Hudson County, New Jersey
