= List of neighborhoods in Jersey City, New Jersey =

Populated places in Hudson County, New Jersey, US

- Bergen-Lafayette
  - Beacon
  - Bergen Hill
  - Communipaw
  - The Junction
  - Jackson Hill
- The Heights
  - Central Avenue
  - Chelsea
  - Sparrow Hill
  - Transfer Station
  - Washington Village, around Palisade Avenue
  - Mount Pleasant, immediately south of Washington Park
  - Van Vorst Heights, historical name for the north and south Riverview microneighborhoods
  - Western Slope
- Historic Downtown
  - Grove Street
  - Hamilton Park
  - Harsimus
  - Boyle Plaza
  - Van Vorst Park
  - The Village
  - West End (historic)
  - Hudson Waterfront
  - Exchange Place / Colgate Center
  - Harborside Financial Center
  - Newport
  - Paulus Hook
  - Powerhouse Arts District, formerly known as "WALDO"
- Greenville
  - Curries Woods
  - Port Liberte
  - Country Village
  - Claremont
- Journal Square
  - Bergen Square
  - Five Corners
  - The Hilltop
  - India Square
  - The Island
  - Marion
  - McGinley Square
- West Side
  - Hackensack Riverfront
  - Country Village
  - Croxton
  - Droyer's Point
  - Lincoln Park / West Bergen
  - Riverbend
  - Society Hill

== See also ==
- Historic Districts in Hudson County, New Jersey
- List of neighborhoods of Hudson County, New Jersey

Neighboring towns in Hudson County:

- Bayonne
- North Hudson
  - North Bergen
  - Weehawken
  - Hoboken
  - Union City
  - West New York
  - Guttenberg
- Secaucus
- West Hudson
