= A&C Bus Corporation =

Bus company in New Jersey

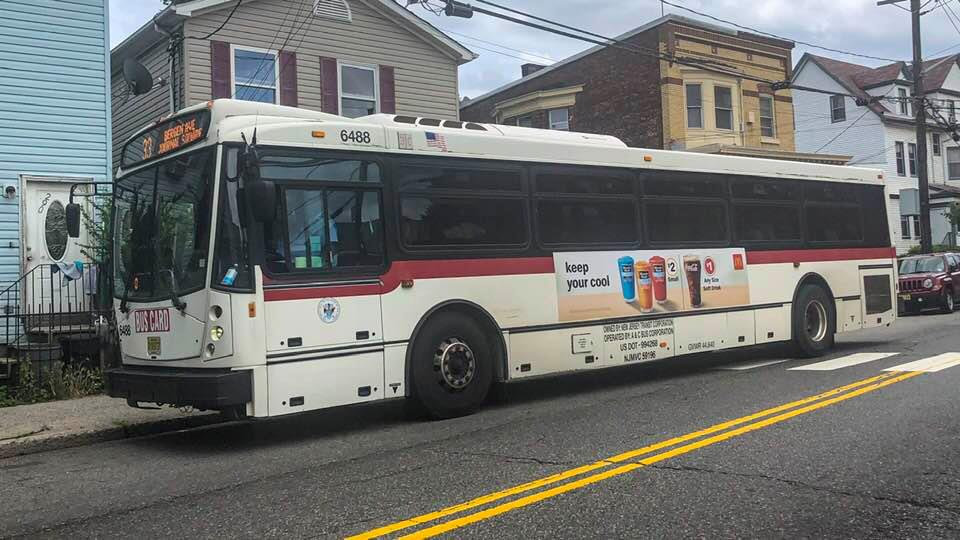
- Formerly: Montgomery & Westside IBOA
- Parent: A&C Bus Corporation
- Founded: 1927
- Ceased operation: 2023
- Headquarters: 430 Danforth Avenue; Jersey City, NJ 07305
- Service area: Jersey City, New Jersey
- Service type: Local bus service
- Routes: 4
- Fleet: 29 (all returned to New Jersey Transit)
- Operator: A&C Bus Corporation

A&C Bus Corporation was an American bus company that operated in Jersey City, New Jersey. The company was established in 1927. In July 2023, A&C announced that it would discontinue operations. On October 28, 2023, the four routes then operated by A&C were taken over by NJ Transit Bus Operations.

== Routes ==
The company had four routes which served the West Side of the city.

Route	Terminals		Operates via	Notes
33 Bergen Avenue	Curries Woods	Journal Square Transportation Center	Bergen Square; McGinley Square; Old Bergen Road	Began service on March 16, 2011; NJT replaced and renamed to 8
31 Montgomery and West Side	Newport Centre Mall	West Side; Danforth Avenue	Montgomery Street, West Side Avenue	NJT replaced and renamed to 9
30 Society Hill	Droyer's Point	Journal Square Transportation Center	Sip Avenue, West Side Avenue	NJT replaced route as 80S
32 - 440 Shopper	Hudson Mall	Journal Square Transportation Center	Sip Avenue, West Side Avenue	NJT replaced and renamed to 14

=== Former routes ===
==== Bergen Avenue route ====
Prior to A&C Bus Corporation's operation of the Bergen Avenue route, the route was operated by Bergen Avenue IBOA. When Bergen Avenue IBOA was unable to make an insurance payment, it abruptly stopped running its only route on March 12, 2011, the New Jersey Department of Transportation (NJDOT) granted emergency operating authority to A&C Bus Corporation. A&C Bus Corporation began operating the route on March 16, 2011, with no changes in bus fares, however it reduced operating hours to 6:30AM–10:00PM (running every half-hour). Since that time, the owners of Bergen Avenue IBOA stated that it intended on selling the rights to operate the route, however the NJDOT stated the company's rights ceased when it abruptly stopped operating with no warning to passengers.

==== Route 4 ====
Route	Terminals		Operates via	Notes
4	Curries Woods	Newport Centre Mall	Ocean Avenue; Pacific Avenue; Communipaw Junction; Grove Street Station	Discontinued on March 2, 2019

Prior to A&C Bus Corporation's assuming operations Route 4 was run by Red & Tan in Hudson County, which discontinued service on November 6, 2011. A&C Bus began operating the route between Greenville and Newport Centre Mall shortly after. It discontinued service on March 2, 2019, citing low ridership. New Jersey Transit route 86 was extended to replace part of the route. NJ Transit Route 1 was also rerouted to replace some of the former Route 4 service along Communipaw and Pacific Avenues beginning on June 22, 2019.

== Fleet ==
The fleet was made up of buses leased from New Jersey Transit.

Year	Make & Model	Length	Picture	Powertrain (Engine & Transmission)	Numbers	Notes
2011–2013	NABI; 416.15 (transit)	40 ft (12.19 m)		Cummins ISL9/ ZF Ecolife 6AP1400B	5757, 5759–5760, 5919–5923, 6463–6488 (33 buses)	Replaced older Nova Buses RTS RT80-2Ns between 2012 and 2014; 5757 and 5919 were retired due to water damage from Hurricane Sandy. 5919 is used as a maintenance training bus at the Ferry Street shops by New Jersey Transit.; New Jersey Transit took all buses back when the company became defunct.

== See also ==
- List of NJ Transit bus routes (1–99)
