= List of neighborhoods in Hudson County, New Jersey =

A list of historical, traditional, local, and recent names for districts and neighborhoods in Hudson County, New Jersey includes:

- Arlington
- Babbitt
- Beacon
- Bergen Hill
- Bergen Neck
- Bergen Point
- Bergen Square
- Bergen-Lafayette
- Bergenline
- Bergenwood
- Boulevard East
- Boyle Plaza
- Bulls Ferry
- Castle Point
- Caven Point
- Claremont
- Communipaw
- Constable Hook
- County Avenue
- Country Village
- Croxton
- Curries Woods
- East Newark
- Elysian Fields
- Exchange Place
- Five Corners
- Downtown Jersey City
- Droyer's Point
- Greenville
- Guttenberg
- Hackensack Riverfront
- Hamilton Park
- Harmon Cove
- Harmon Meadows
- Harsimus
- Horseshoe
- Hudson Heights
- Jersey City Heights
- Journal Square
- Kearny Uplands
- Kings Bluff
- Liberty State Park
- Lincoln Park/West Bergen
- Marion Section
- McGinley Square
- Meadowview
- MOTBY
- New Durham
- Newport
- North End
- North Hudson
- Nungessers
- Pamrapo
- Paulus Hook
- Pavonia
- Port Jersey
- Port Liberte
- Powerhouse
- Racetrack
- Riverbend
- Schuetzen Park
- Secaucus Plaza
- The Shades
- South Kearny
- Snake Hill
- Transfer Station
- Union Hill
- Van Vorst Park
- WALDO
- Weehawken Heights
- West Hudson
- West Side, Jersey City
- Western Slope
- Woodcliff

== See also ==
- Historic townships of Hudson County, New Jersey
- National Register of Historic Places listings in Hudson County, New Jersey
- Historic Districts in Hudson County
