= Skyway Park =

Park being developed in Jersey City, New Jersey

- Location within Hudson County, New Jersey
- Location: Jersey City, New Jersey
- Coordinates: 40.737137°N 74.087128°W
- Area: 32 acres (0.13 km^{2})
- Created: 2009
- Open: 2021

Skyway Park is a 32-acre (13 ha) park being developed in Jersey City, New Jersey on the Hackensack River, partly under the Pulaski Skyway, from which it takes its name. The brownfield land was the site of the PJP Landfill. It is a component of the Hackensack River Greenway, a linear park along the banks of the river and Newark Bay.

== Brownfield site ==
The United States Environmental Protection Agency declared the parcel at the PJP Landfill a Superfund site in 1982 and the landfill was capped in 1985.

In 2008, AMB Corporation bought approximately 51.76 acres (20.95 ha) of the site. This property was to be capped and a warehouse constructed, while the rest of the property owned by AMB would be turned into greenspace. The Remedial Action Construction began in 2008. It has been redeveloped, and is home to a warehouse and a walkway. The remaining portion of the site is managed by Waste Management of New Jersey, Inc. and CWM Chemical Services, LLC (collectively “CCS”), which are responsible for a multi-layer, modified solid waste cap, wetlands reconstruction and enhancement efforts, and environmental monitoring.

== Location and design ==
Initially introduced as Marion Greenway Park, the project first received funding in 2009. The park is in the Marion Section on the West Side of the city between U.S. Route 1/9 Truck and the Hackensack River, north of Lincoln Park, with which it has the potential to be connected as part of the Hackensack River Greenway project.

=== Covid memorial ===
The park will include one of the first memorials in North America for victims of the coronavirus pandemic. The site will have one tree planted for each Jersey City resident who died of the disease. Construction has been delayed by the environmental approval process.
