= Bergen City, New Jersey =

Former city in Hudson County, New Jersey

Coordinates: 40.69°N 74.08°W

Bergen was a city that existed in Hudson County, New Jersey, United States, from 1855 to 1870.

== History ==
Bergen was originally incorporated as a town by an Act of the New Jersey Legislature on March 24, 1855, from portions of Bergen Township. In 1862, it did a reverse takeover, absorbing the remaining portions of Bergen Township. On April 14, 1863, portions of the town were taken to form Greenville Township. Bergen was reincorporated as the City of Bergen on March 11, 1868:

Be It Enacted by the Senate and General Assembly the State of New Jersey, That the city of Bergen shall after consist of all the territory included within the following boundaries, that is to say: beginning at the most west corner of the city of Hudson, in the county of Hudson where the New Jersey railroad crosses the Hackensack River; thence easterly along the centre line of the New Jersey rail road its several courses to the centre of Mill Creek; then southerly along the centre of Mill Creek its several course into New York Bay, until it intersects the boundary line of the state of New York; thence southerly along said boundary line of the state of New York until it intersects the dividing line between the township of Greenville and the city of Bergen; thence westerly along said line to the middle of the Hackensack river; thence northerly along the middle of the Hackensack river its several courses to the place of beginning, comprising the same territory heretofore known and incorporated as The Town of Bergen.

In 1866, Library Hall was built and served as the town hall for Bergen Township, then later as Bergen City, before annexation. Library Hall has been preserved and is now a residential building.

On May 2, 1870, both Bergen City and Hudson City were annexed by Jersey City. Bergen City roughly corresponds with the southern part of Journal Square, part of the West Side (West Bergen) and the Bergen-Lafayette neighborhoods.
