= Bayfront, Jersey City =

Populated place in Hudson County, New Jersey, US

Coordinates: 40.714°N 74.101°W

Bayfront is an urban redevelopment project in Jersey City, New Jersey.

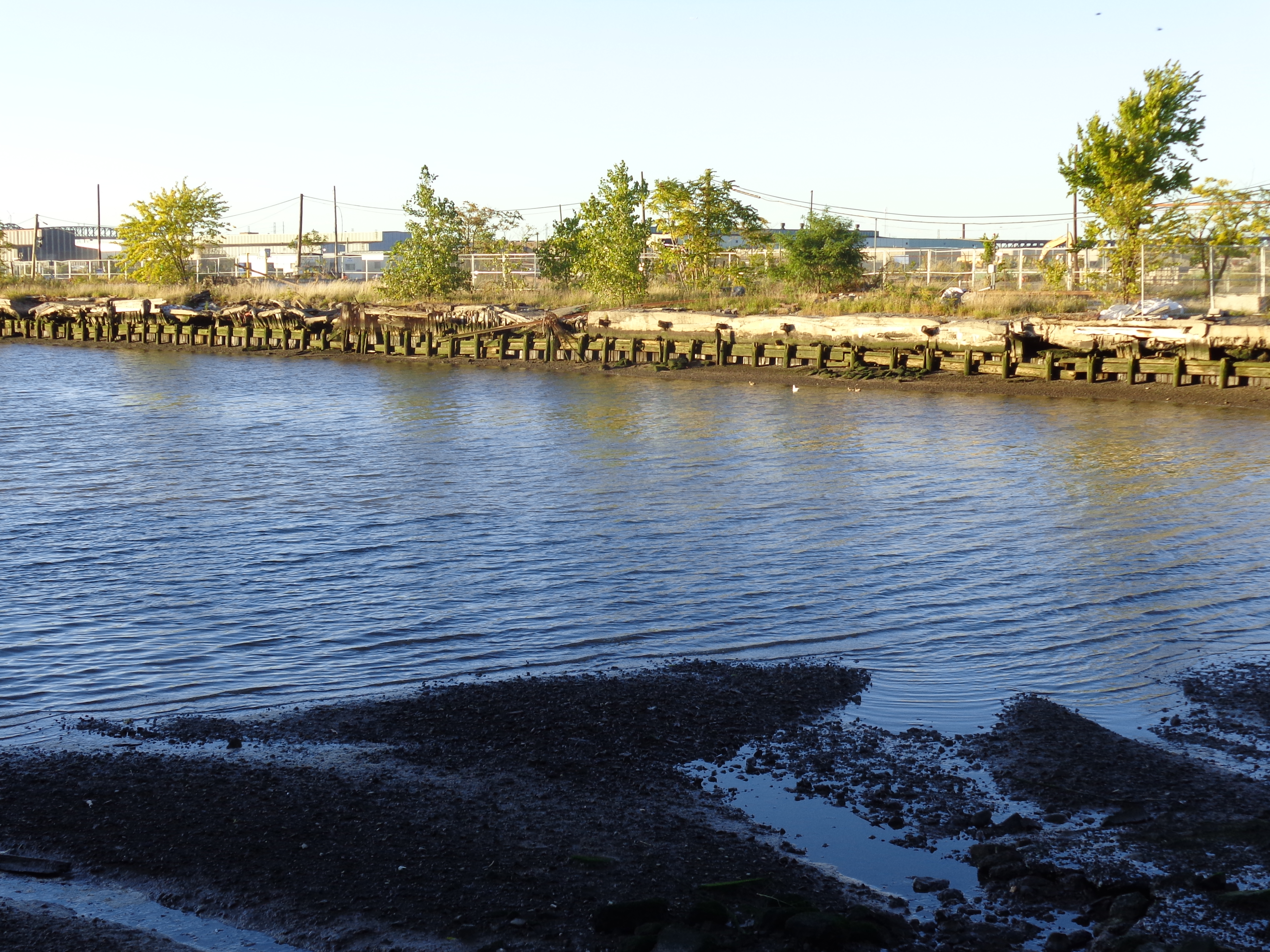
View looking north across cove from Droyer's Point

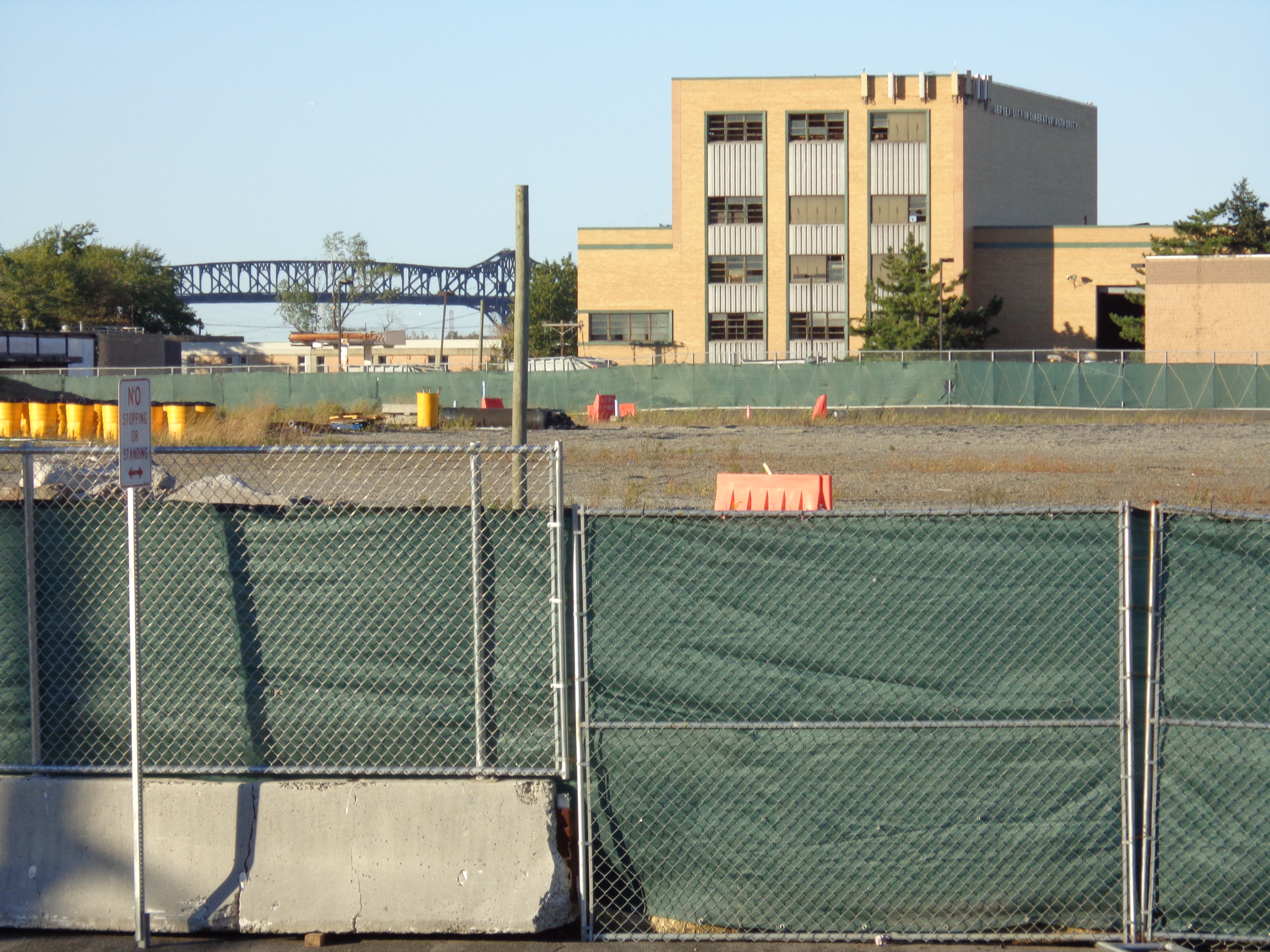
Bayfront site looking north to Jersey City Public Works building and Pulaski Skyway

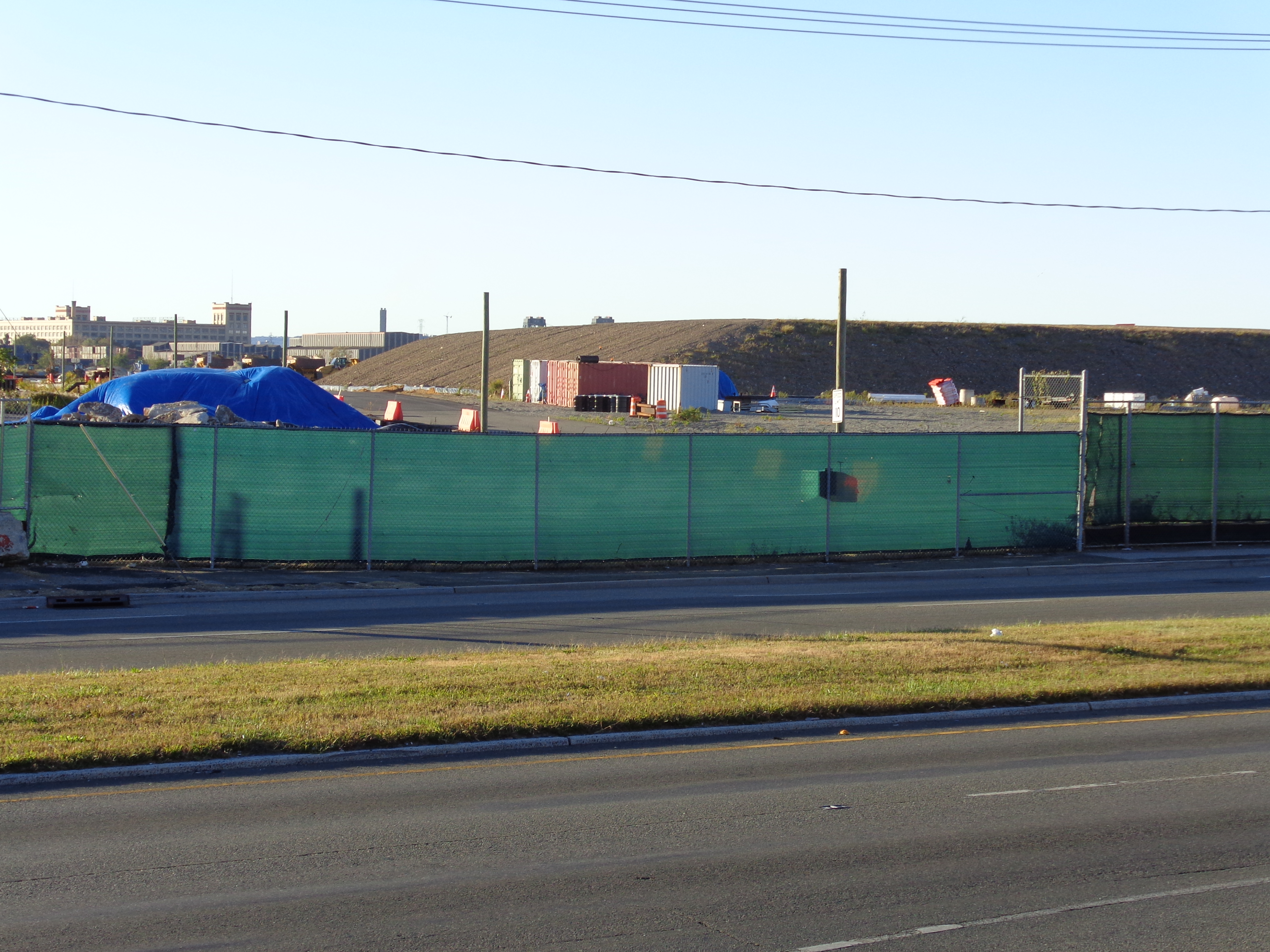
Route 440 may be reconfigured as "urban boulevard", making it more pedestrian friendly

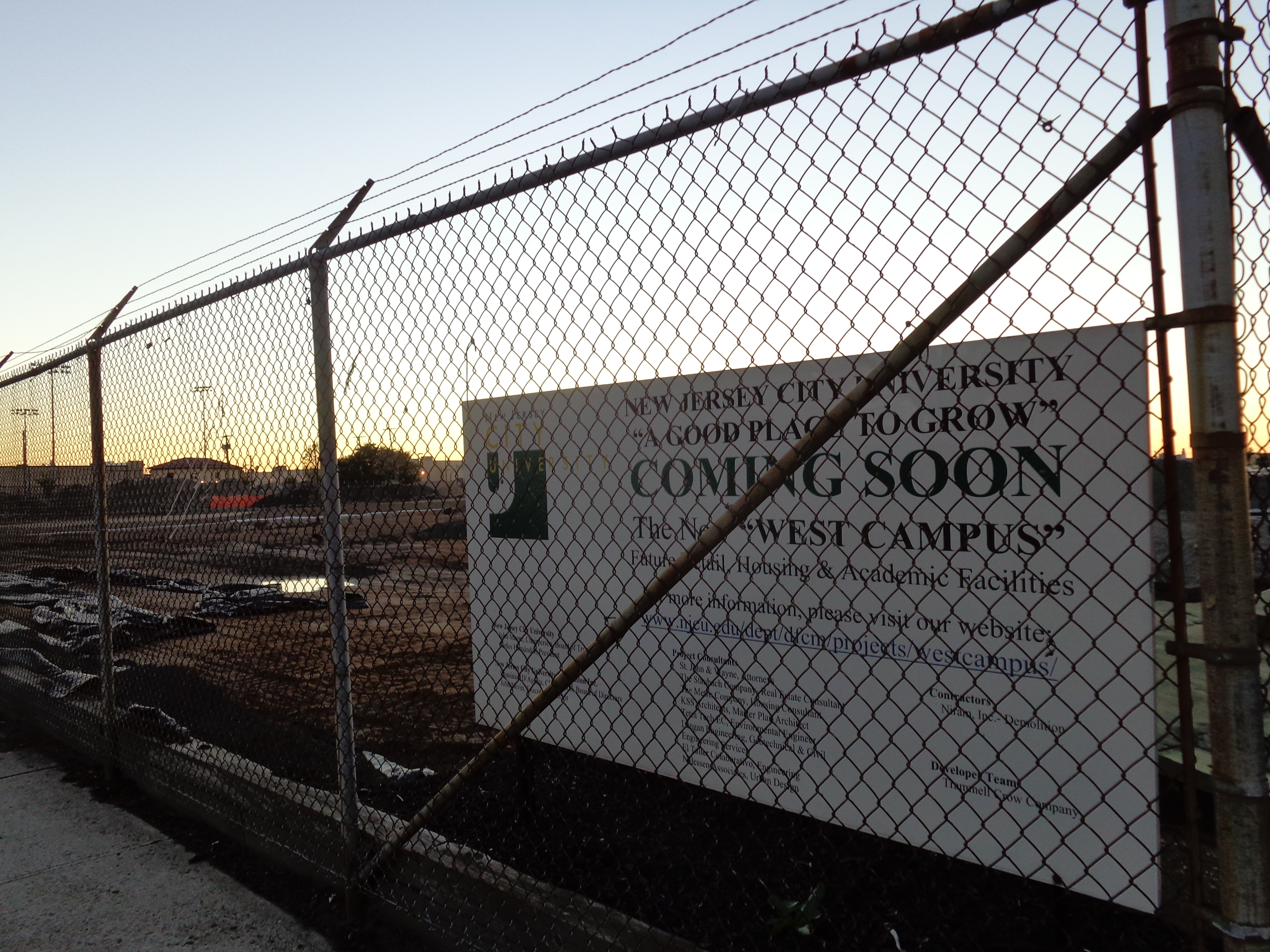
New Jersey City University is expanding to a West Campus

== Hackensack Riverfront ==
The Hackensack Riverfront is an area on the eastern banks of the Hackensack River near its mouth at Newark Bay. It is on the West Side of the city, specifically west of NJ Route 440. It lies north of Droyer's Point and south of Lincoln Park. It is home to the Hudson Mall, Four Hundred Forty Shopping Center and the former Jersey City Public Works incinerator as well as the planned site. Kearny Point and the piers of the former Federal Shipbuilding and Drydock Company, now River Terminal, are on the opposite bank. The Hackensack RiverWalk is a partially complete greenway promenade intended to run from the Bayonne Bridge to the Hackensack Meadowlands in North Bergen, mostly at the water's edge.

== Bayfront project ==
Bayfront is a proposed mixed-use development to be situated on a 100-acre (0.40 km^{2}) brownfield site and developed though a public-private partnership once environmental remediation of toxic waste is completed by Honeywell, which purchased a company that once operated facilities there. Though separated by the highway, Bayfront and the West Campus of New Jersey City University (NJCU) were intended to transform large parts of the city from industrial and manufacturing zones into residential, educational, recreational and commercial zones. Development plans are required to incorporate public access to the river's edge along the bulkhead and will connect to the esplanade at Droyer's Point. While construction was expected to begin in 2016, chromium and other waste reclamation was still being completed as of 2017. The project won't be completely "built out" until 2043, however. Under the 2008 agreement, the city turned over 35 acres (0.14 km^{2}) of municipal land to Honeywell, which agreed to cover the cost of the environmental cleanup. That land along Route 440 is home to the Jersey City Incinerator Authority (JCIA), the Department of Public Works (DPW), and the Jersey City Municipal Utilities Authority (JCIA). JCIA and the DPW will relocate to a new location on Linden Avenue. Some JCMUA functions will also be relocated and downsized. Remediation work was completed in 2009 of several other formerly contaminated sites, including the sites of the old Roosevelt Drive-in and the new NJCU West Campus. The city will purchase the property and apportion the land, lay out infrastructure, and resell parcels to developers.

In July 2022, the first phase of the project, called Bayfront Promenade, was given approval by the city. In May 2025, the building broke ground. Bayfront Promenade will be a 210-mixed use development with 80% affordable housing.

== Boulevard and BRT ==
In March 2011, NJDOT granted nearly $640,000 for engineering work to transform Route 440, between the two projects and beyond to an urban boulevard.

Plans include the use of the Journal Square BRT, a bus rapid system along the boulevard. As envisioned, the BRT corridor would run from Droyer's Point and reach Journal Square via Sip Avenue.

== HBLR extension ==
Currently bus service is provided by A&C Bus Corporation route 32 from the shopping centers or Droyer's Point to Journal Square. In May 2011 after two years of studies, New Jersey Transit announced a plan for 0.7 mile extension of the West Side Branch of the Hudson Bergen Light Rail from its current terminus. The new track would be laid along the former Newark and New York Branch right-of-way on an elevated viaduct from the West Side Avenue Station over Route 440 to the northern end of the redevelopment area, where a new station would be constructed. The trip between the two stations would take 1 minute and 50 seconds. The project, eligible for federal funding, is estimated to cost $171.6 million. As of March 2017, funding for final design and engineering work was appropriated. Construction of the first phase of the extension commenced in March 2020.

== Ferry study ==
Bayfront is considered potential site of ferry service along the Hackensack. Studies will be commissioned in 2020.

== See also ==
- Canal Crossing
- Route of the Lincoln Highway
- Marion Section
