= West Side, Jersey City =

Populated place in Hudson County, New Jersey, US

Coordinates: 40.724751°N 74.082884°W

The West Side of Jersey City is an area made up of several diverse neighborhoods on either side of West Side Avenue, one of the city's main shopping streets. Parallel and west of Kennedy Boulevard, West Side Avenue carries two county route designations.

West Side Avenue at its northern end begins in the Marion Section as a dead end at the PATH trains, though there is no station there After crossing Broadway and Sip Avenue it passes Holy Name Cemetery on the west and nearby Saint Peter's University to the east. "The Bubble", an air-supported structure that is part of Yanitelli Center, is visible on the slope of Montgomery Street.

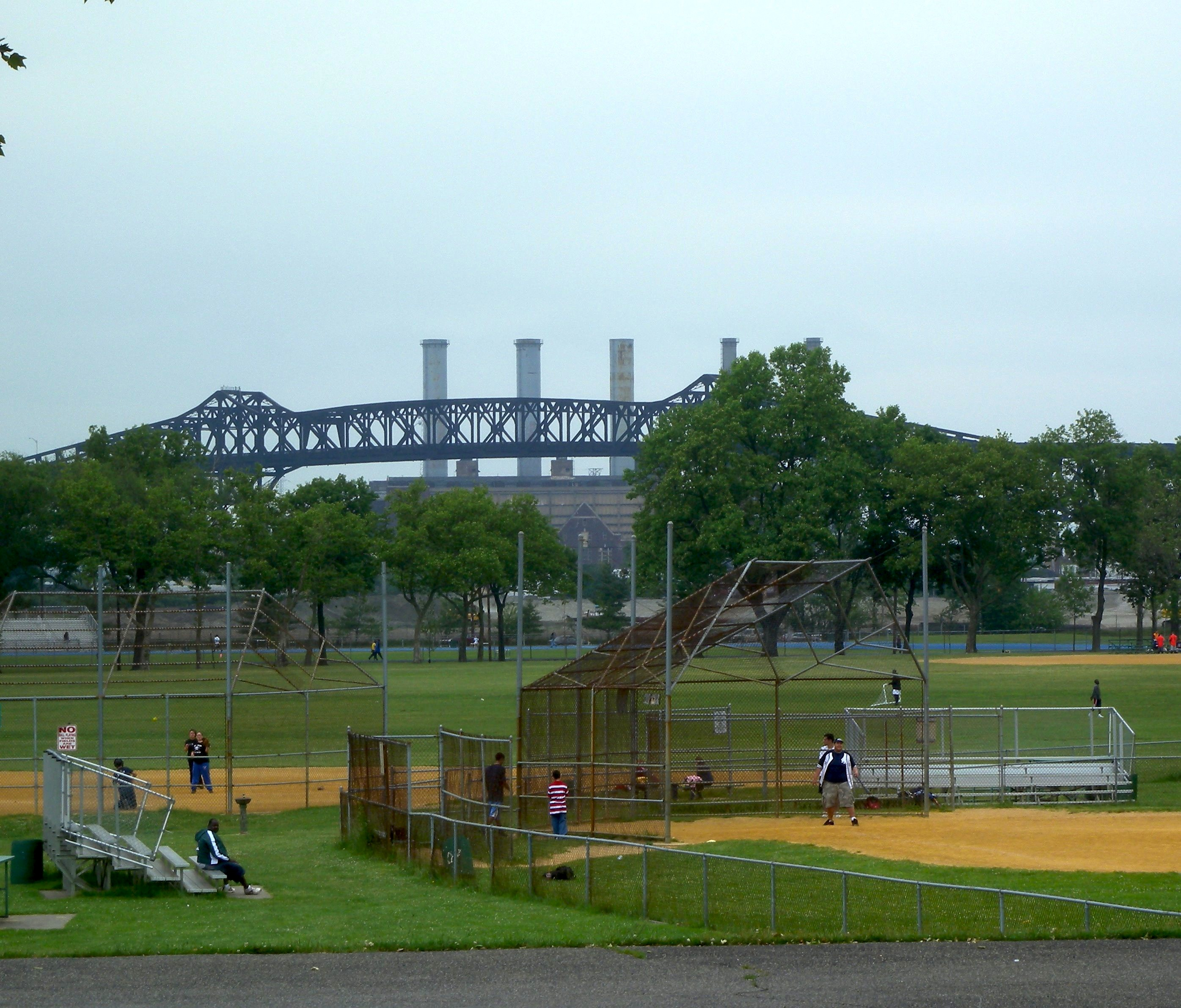
Lincoln Park and Pulaski Skyway

Lincoln Park is one of the largest county parks in Hudson County and includes recreational facilities (tennis, track, athletic fields, golf range, biking, running) and picnicking areas. Overpasses provide pedestrian access over Truck 1-9 from the older, more urban eastern section of the park to the more natural west section on the Hackensack River. The streets ascending from the park contain an eclectic mix of architectural styles including Victorian and Edwardian mansions, and pre-war and Art Deco apartment buildings in the Bergen Section. St Aloyius Church is a prominent landmark near the park.

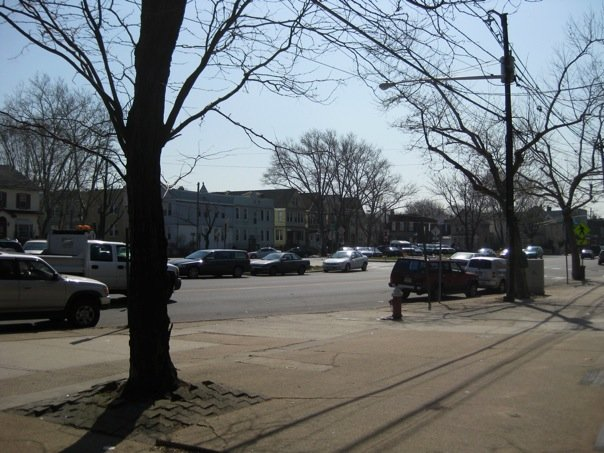
Mallory Square, a small Filipino American neighborhood in the Lincoln Park/West Bergen area of Jersey City's West Side

At Communipaw Avenue the street enters the heart of West Bergen. West Bergen is so called in reference Bergen-Lafayette Section and in the 19th century was part of Bergen Township and Bergen. (The name Bergen is from the original Bergen, New Netherland centered on Bergen Square). One of the very few older residential districts of the city west of the avenue radiates from Mallory Avenue as it runs south from Lincoln Park.

The West Side Avenue Station is the terminus for the single branch of the Hudson Bergen Light Rail. The station is on an embankment above the east side of street, and consists of an island platform and two tracks. Bumper blocks are at the west end of the station, a pedestrian bridge and elevator connecting it a large park and ride lot and bus stations. The former Central Railroad of New Jersey right of way formerly continued west across the Newark and New York Railroad Bridge at Newark Bay and there are proposals to extend the line to a station close by. The Jersey City Board of Education is located nearby.

The West Campus of New Jersey City University began development in 2006, and will more than double the campus's with academic buildings, residences, retail spaces, parking, and a "University Promenade." Along with Bayfront, Jersey City, another planned community, the West Side will be expanded with residential, retail, and recreational areas.

West Side Avenue's southern end is the Country Village section of Greenville at Danforth Avenue close to NJ-440, across which is the Droyer's Point and completed sections of the Hackensack RiverWalk.

Several New Jersey Transit bus routes serve the district.

== See also ==
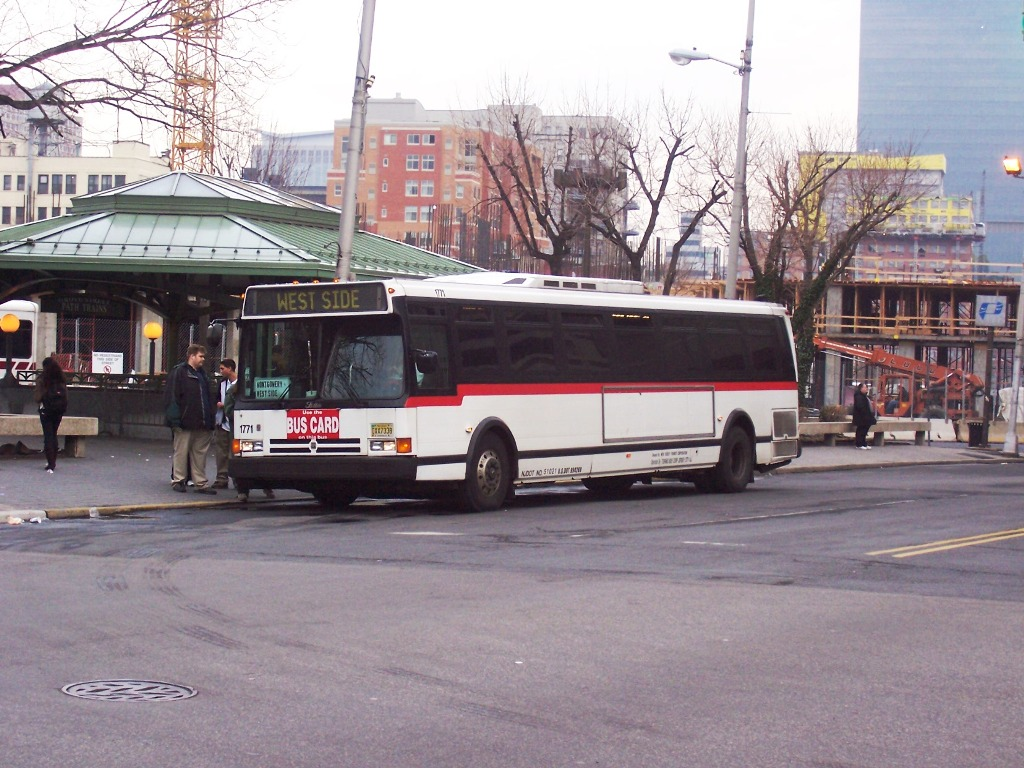
Montgomery West Side bus travels from Downtown JC

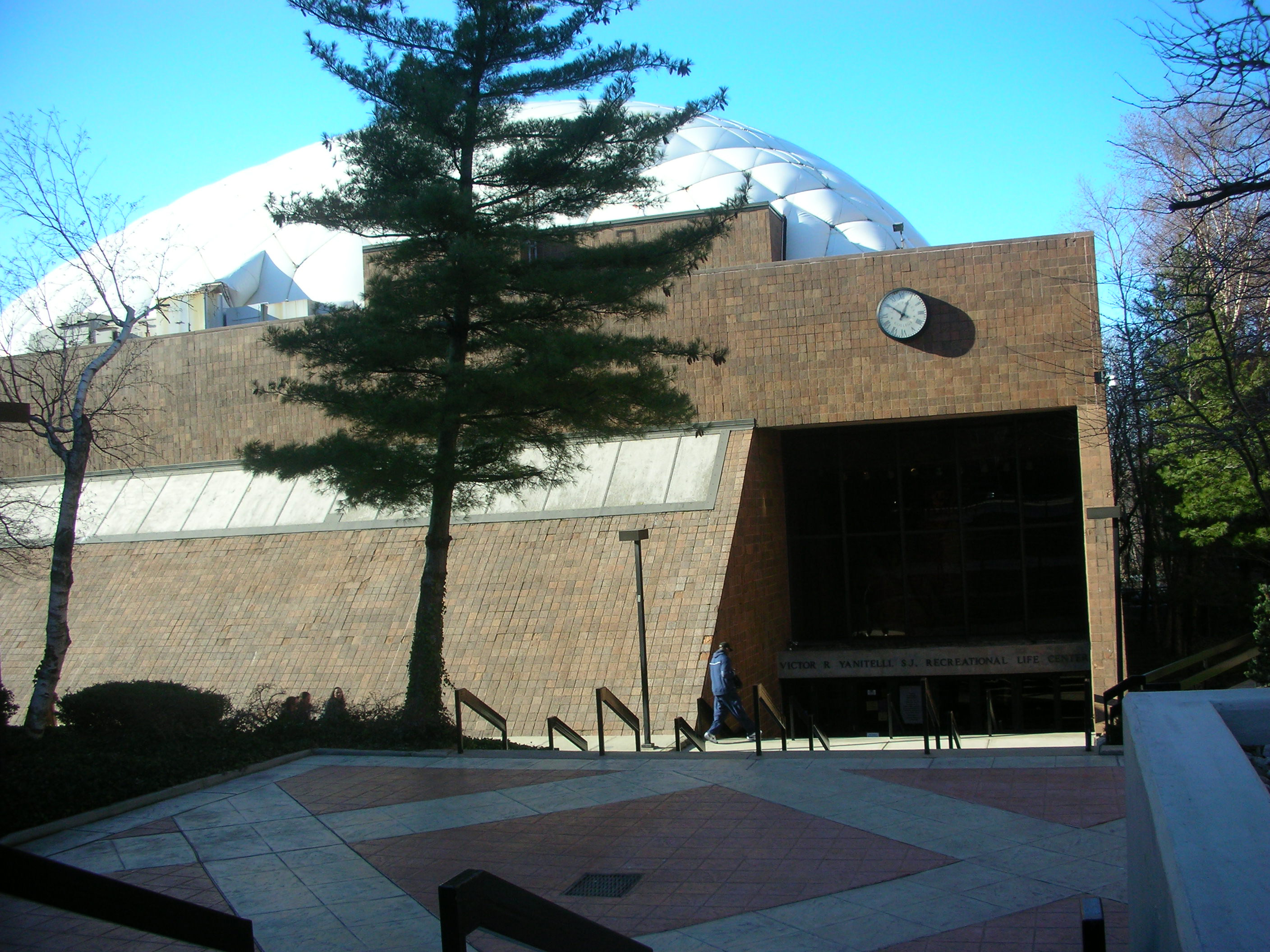
The Yanitelli Center on the campus of Saint Peter's University

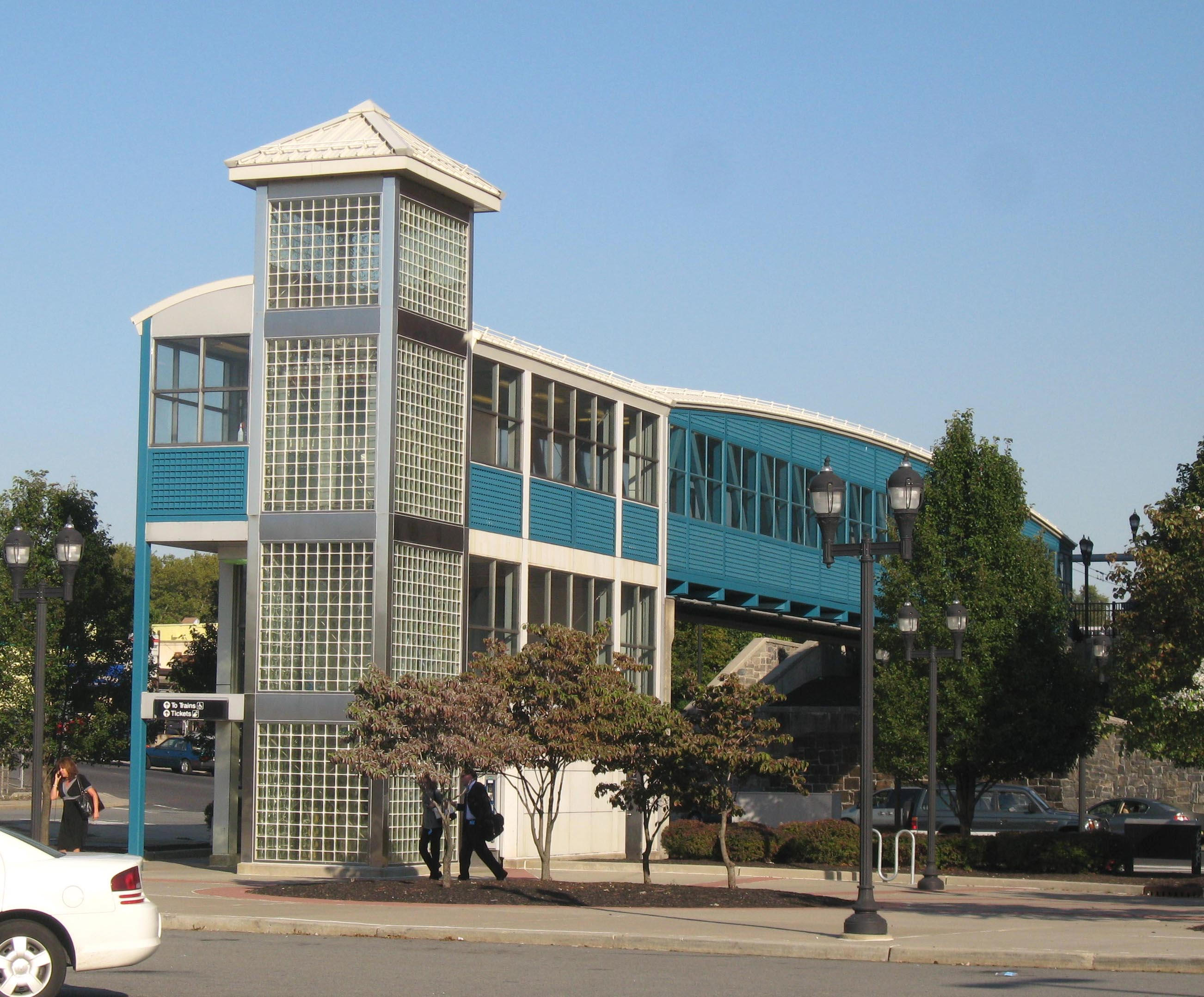
West Side Avenue (HBLR station)
- Hudson Parks
- National Register of Historic Places listings in Hudson County, New Jersey
- List of neighborhoods in Jersey City, New Jersey
- Fairmount Apartments (Jersey City, New Jersey)
- Temple Beth-El
