= Droyer's Point =

Populated place in Hudson County, New Jersey, US

Coordinates: 40°42′36″N 74°6′20″W

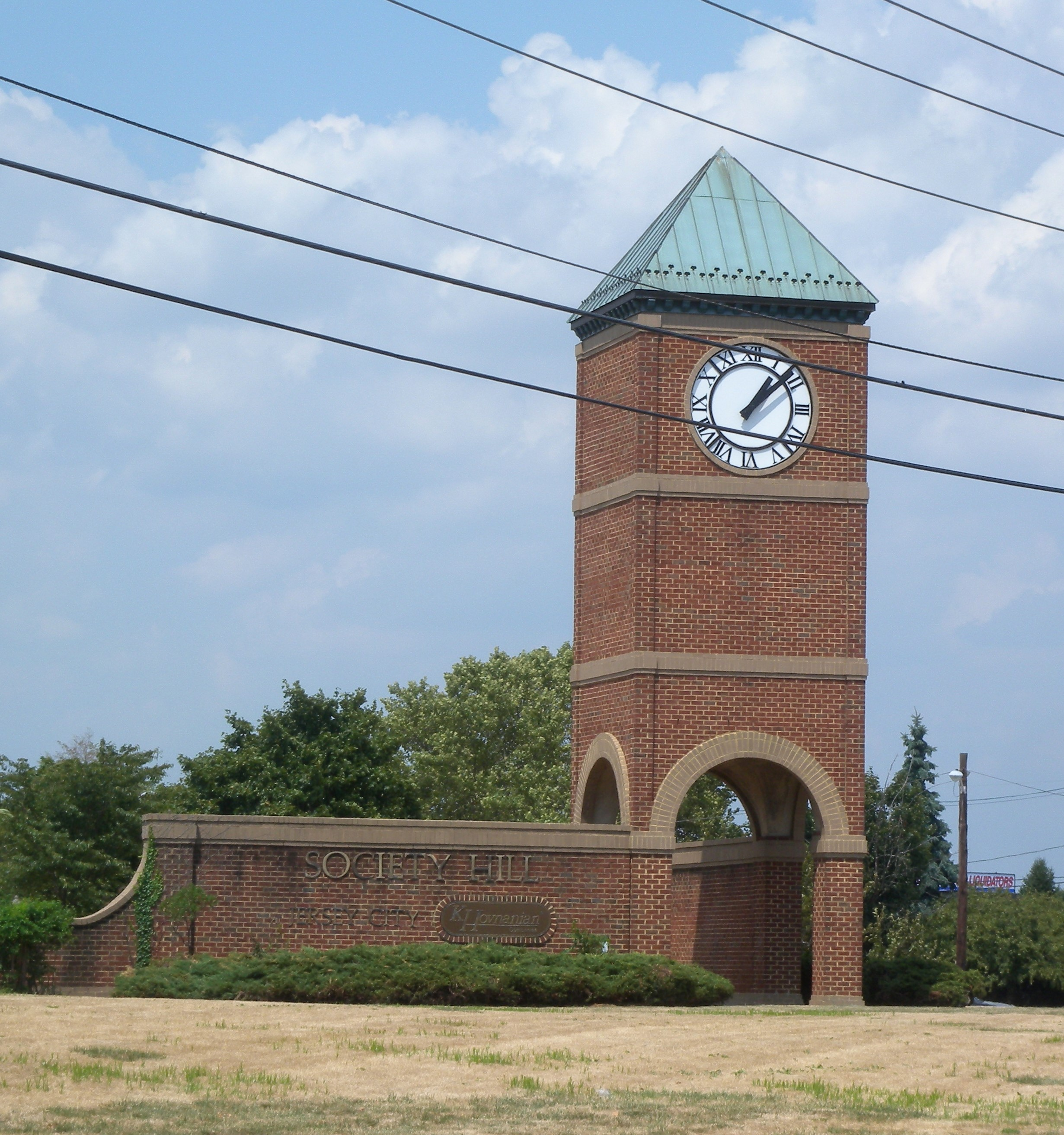
Clock tower in Society Hill

Droyer's Point is a section of Jersey City, New Jersey, at Newark Bay that was the site of the Jersey City Airport and later of Roosevelt Stadium, both of which were demolished. It has become a residential and commercial district.

== Geography ==
In the southwestern part of the city, Droyer's Point is located on the Newark Bay. Its eastern perimeter is New Jersey Route 440. The point is entered from the highway's intersection with Danforth Avenue. To the north, Kellog Street creates its boundary with the brownfield and site of Bayfront, a planned urban development project. The point itself is opposite Kearny Point, with which it marks the mouth of the Hackensack River.

== Description ==
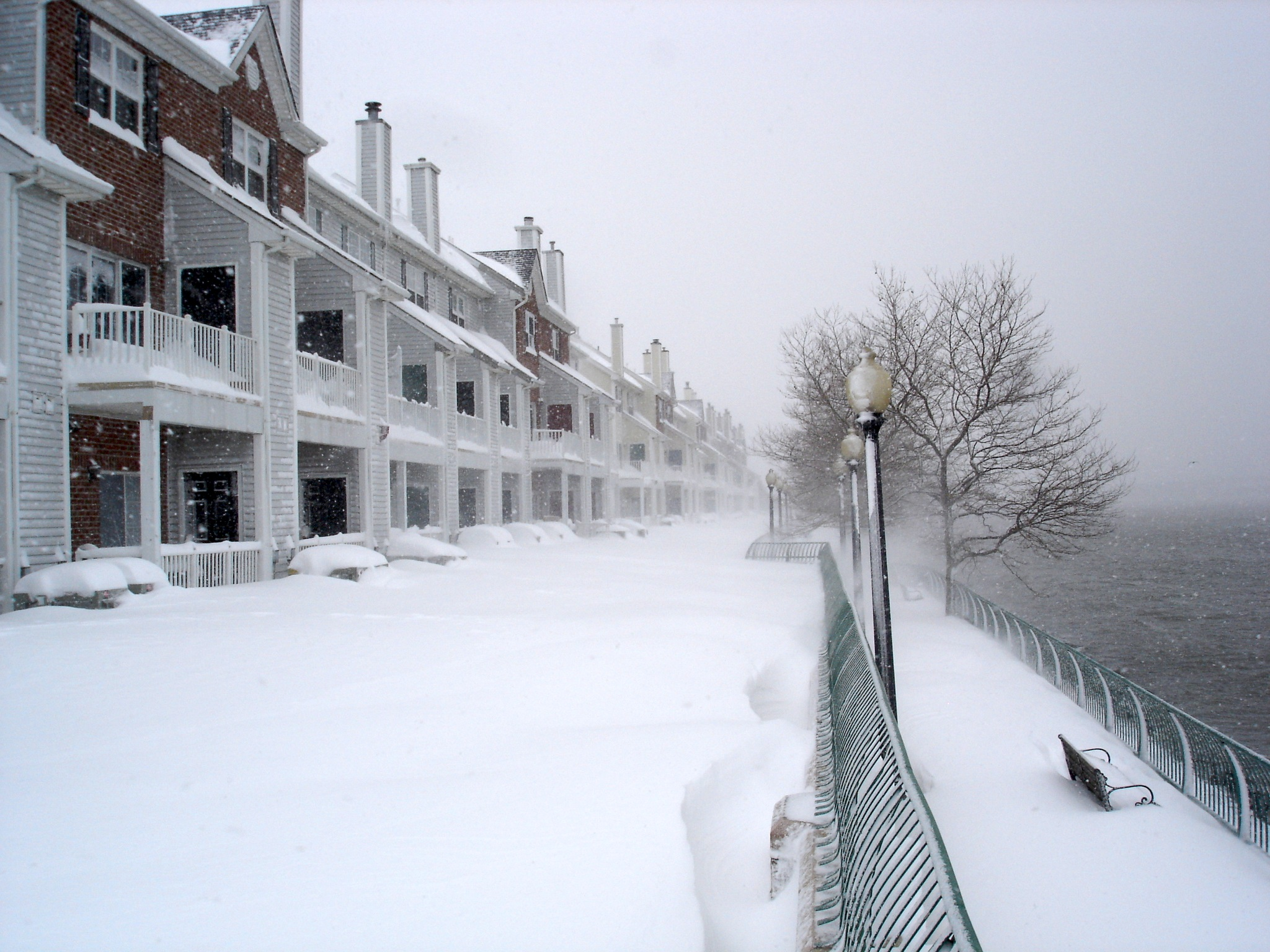
Winter on the Hackensack RiverWalk at Society Hill

Since the 1990s Droyer's Point has been developed as a residential and recreation area. At its southern end is the Athletic Complex of New Jersey City University – its other locations are further inland on the West Side. Just to the north are the residential communities built by Hovnanian Enterprises. Construction was delayed until there was remediation of chromium found at the site. Known as Society Hill, the first phase of townhomes were built c1993-94, with phase two being constructed c1995-96. The Droyer's Point townhouses were built c2003-04. The complex includes condominium and rental townhomes and apartments, including amenities such as pools, tennis courts, clubhouses and a marina. Completed portions of the Hackensack RiverWalk, a public waterfront promenade which is accessible to the public through entrances outside the development, run along the shoreline.

== History ==
=== Minkakwa and Morris Canal ===
Originally a tidal marsh, the area was the territory of the Hackensack and Raritan at the time of European contact in the 17th century. They called the area on Minkakwa, meaning a place of good crossing. This is likely so because it was the most convenient pass between two bays (the other being the Upper New York Bay) on either side of the Bergen Neck peninsula and near a natural break in Bergen Hill, the formation that rises to become the Hudson Palisades. Interpreted as place where the coves meet, in this case where they are closest to each, it describes a spot advantageous for portage. Just inland of Droyer's Point the construction of the Morris Canal in the 1830s took advantage of the geology to cut across Pamrapo. The canal then ran parallel to the bay before connecting to the river at a location further to the north. A filled portion of the landmark can still be seen as an unmarked right of way in the nearby Country Village neighborhood.

=== Jersey City Airport ===
In the 1920s the land which was owned by the city became the object of development which included land reclamation and the construction of bulkhead, with the intention of expanding the city's port facilities south of the CRRNJ Newark and New York Branch (which traveled from Downtown Newark across the river and Bergen Hill to Communipaw Terminal). While the planned distribution facilities never materialized, the area did become the site of the short lived Jersey City Airport, which opened in 1927. For a short time the airport was operated by Eddie August Schneider, a native of the city and one of early aviation's youthful celebrities. After the end of World War Two, Jersey Skyports was founded by three former Naval aviators, Edward Selig Binder, John Barteluse, and Bill Christie, and operated for five years. The Jersey City Seaplane Base which was owned by Harry Frank, was later located nearby.

=== Roosevelt Stadium ===
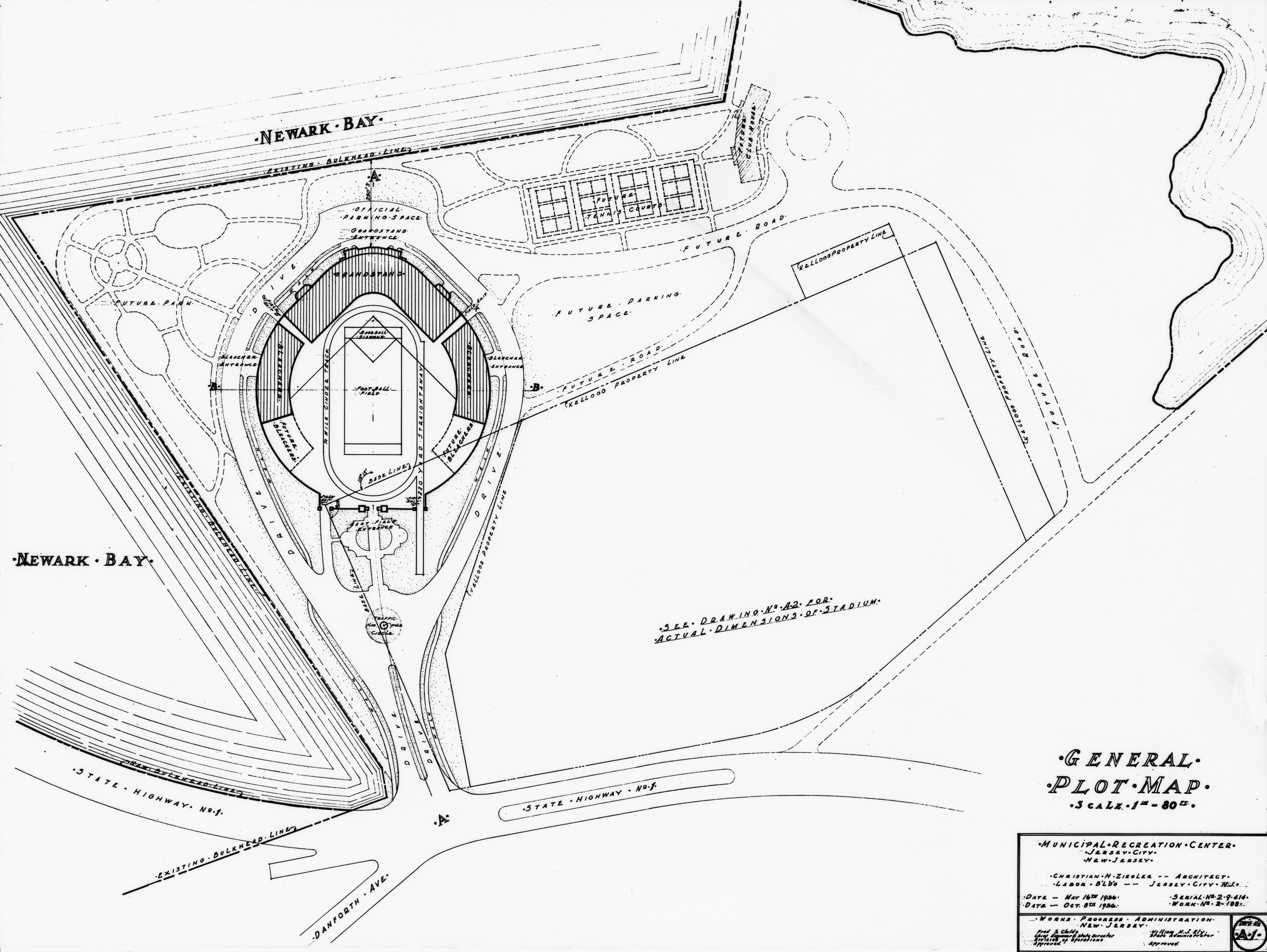
Map of Droyer's Point during stadium era

The Art Deco style Roosevelt Stadium was Works Progress Administration project secured by Jersey City Mayor Frank Hague, as was the Jersey City Medical Center. It was named for President Franklin D. Roosevelt, the author of that New Deal agency. Groundbreaking took place in 1935. The baseball park's opening was scheduled for April 22, 1937 with the opening of the 1937 International League season. Mayor Hague declared a half-holiday for the city's schools and employees. New York Giants owner Horace Stoneham was expected at the opener along with Senator A. Harry Moore. Rain washed out the planned events and the opening was postponed until April 23 with Mayor Hague throwing out the first pitch and Sen. Moore and owner Horace Stoneham on hand for the ballpark's dedication.

The stadium was also the home field of the Jersey City Giants, and was used for seven "home" games by the Brooklyn Dodgers during their last couple of seasons in Brooklyn, 1956 and 1957. On April 18, 1946, Roosevelt Stadium hosted the Jersey City Giants' season opener against the Montreal Royals, marking the professional debut of the Royals' Jackie Robinson. The stadium also hosted boxing bouts including fight with Max Baer, "Two Ton" Tony Galento, Marcel Cerdan and Tony Zale. In 1950, Sugar Ray Robinson defended his welterweight title; in 1951, Jersey Joe Walcott beat heavyweight champion Ezzard Charles. During the 1970s the stadium was used every summer as a major concert venue with performances by the Grateful Dead, Allman Brothers Band, Beach Boys, Eric Clapton, Tony Bennett, and Crosby, Stills, Nash and Young, among others. In November 1982, the Jersey City Council voted to demolish the stadium. It was demolished in 1985.

== Transportation ==
The district is served by New Jersey Transit buses with service to Journal Square via West Side Avenue. There is discussion to extend the Hudson Bergen Light Rail from the current West Side Avenue (HBLR station) terminus to a location near the waterfront, but there is no projected date for the project. The Danforth Avenue Station is located about a mile to the east. Direct commuter bus service to Manhattan is provided by privately operated NYC Commuter.
