= Country Village, Jersey City =

Populated place in Hudson County, New Jersey, US

Coordinates: 40°41′57″N 74°06′09″W

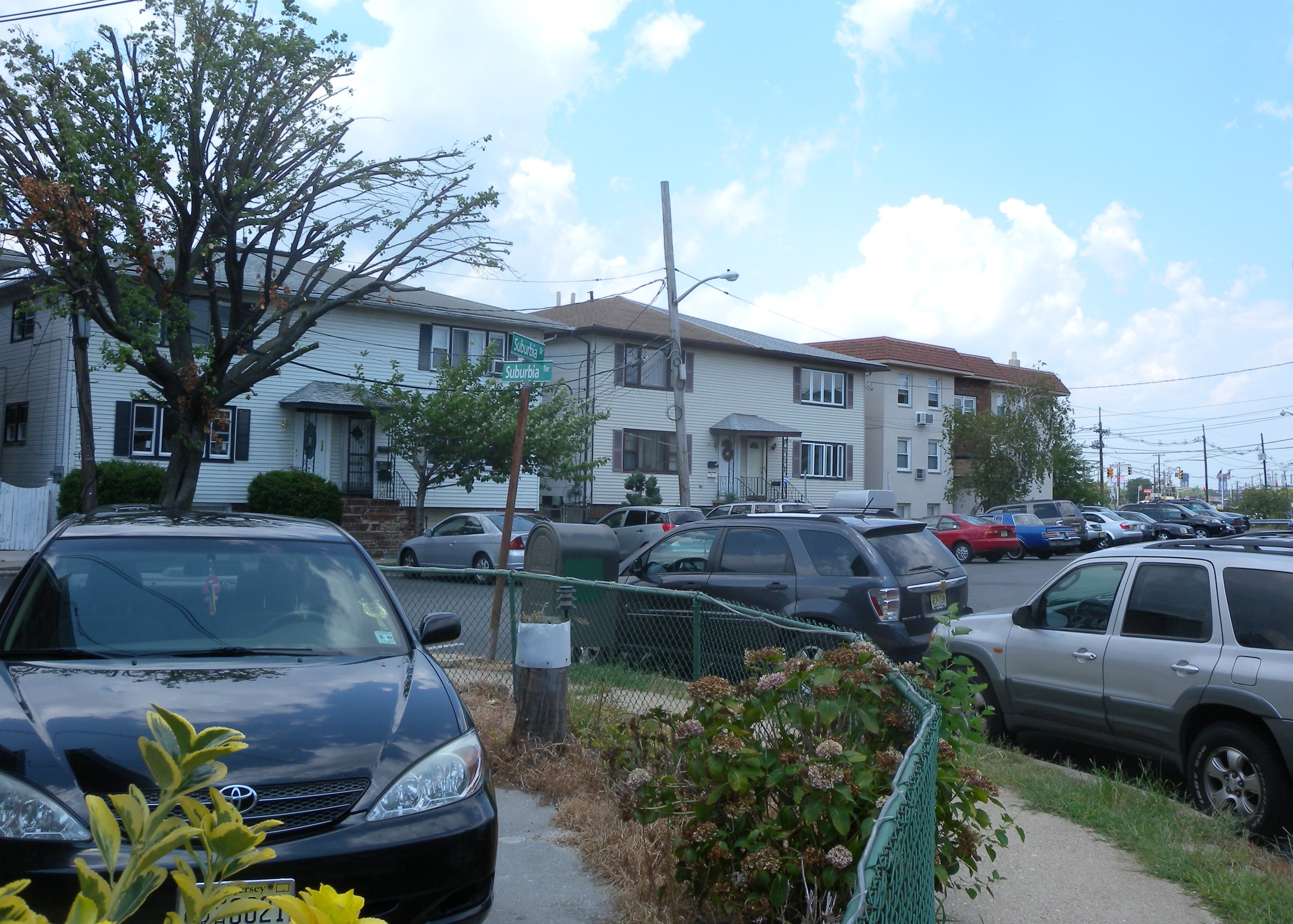
At the intersection of Suburbia Terrace and Suburbia Drive

Country Village is a residential enclave in the southwestern corner of the Greenville section on the West Side of Jersey City, New Jersey that was built as planned community in the early 1960s.

== Design and geography ==
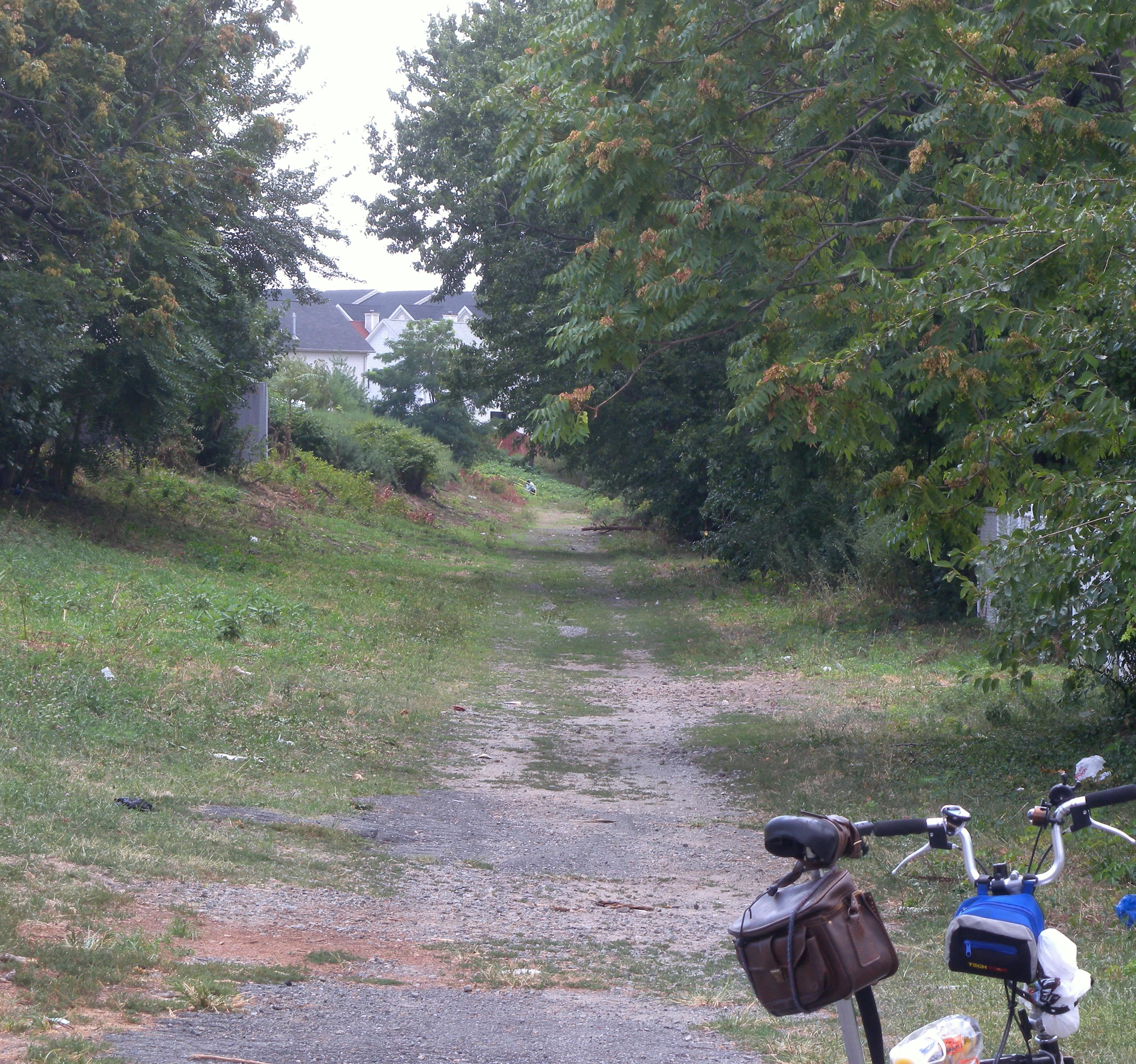
Filled Morris Canal backs some of the yards in the neighborhood.

Designed as "suburbia-in-the-city" the community consists of one-family Colonial style homes, two-family Cape Cod-style homes, and one-family ranch-style homes streets with the names Sycamore Road, Norcroft Road, Suburbia Terrace, Delmar Road, and Oakdale Road. The houses are densely placed and some have garages so there are few front gardens, though most streets are tree-lined.

Country Village is enclosed on its southern and western perimeter side by New Jersey Route 440, across from which is Newark Bay. Access to the waterfront is limited due to the highway, presenting an obstacle to the development of the Hackensack RiverWalk planned along its shores. The city-line with Bayonne cuts through a small southern part of the neighborhood. The line was originally created along the banks of the Morris Canal, a short filled section of the national historic site running through Country Village as an unmarked, undeveloped, right of way. It creates the official eastern perimeter of the enclave, though the western slope descending from Kennedy Boulevard is somewhat similar in style and character. Danforth Avenue, a major crosstown and commercial street of Greenville, is to the north, its intersection at West Side Avenue marking the origination point of that avenue. To the south are the approaches to two bay crossings, the Newark Bay Bridge and the Lehigh Valley Railroad Bridge.

The neighborhood is in the city's Ward "A" and along with neighboring Bayonne is part of Freeholders District 1.

== History ==
The purpose of the new housing was to offer middle-income urban dwellers an opportunity to buy homes in a residential area with an "out of town" feel without the need for long commutes. In 1959 Jersey City Planning Commission rezoned the 42-acre (170,000 m^{2}) undeveloped industrial tract for residential use. Census figures for the city had revealed a steady decline in the population. (After reaching a height of 316,715 in 1930 and by 1960 the downward trend had reached 276,101.) It was hoped that the creation of new residential districts would increase the population of the city once again. The low-lying area had never been developed because of drainage and sewerage problems. Interested parties in the site were discouraged by the land reclamation requirements for factories to be constructed there. In 1960, however, the builder Alexander Muss took on the task of filling in the lowland area with 400,000 square yards of landfill costing over $500,000. The source of the landfill was sand pumped in from the bottom of Newark Bay. When completed, the 553 houses that cost from $19,000 to $23,000 were reportedly all sold by 1964.

== Transportation ==
NJ Transit buses 8, 9, 10, 14, 80, and 129 serve this area.
