= Curries Woods =

Populated place in Hudson County, New Jersey, US

Coordinates: 40.68903°N 74.09557°W

Curries Woods is a neighborhood in the southern part of Greenville in Jersey City, New Jersey bordering Bayonne. It was named after James Curie, who was on the town Committee for Greenville when it was its own Township in the 19th century. The area remained rural until the later part of the century when the Central Railroad of New Jersey built a line connecting ferries to Elizabeth, New Jersey and New York City. Currie's Woods still remained untouched through the late part of the century and it was valued for its woods, rocky shore and dunes on Newark Bay. A lot of the land was eventually lost, but a tract was set aside in the early part of the 20th century. A small cemetery, the Old Greenville Cemetery, was nearby. This park lost much of its land to the city's largest Housing Authority project in 1959, except a small tract in Bayonne, Mercer Park.

== Pamrapo ==
An 1837 map of the peninsula between the Upper New York Bay and the Newark Bay in Hudson County. The map is oriented with North pointing to the right. Pamrepaw is located in the center of the peninsula.

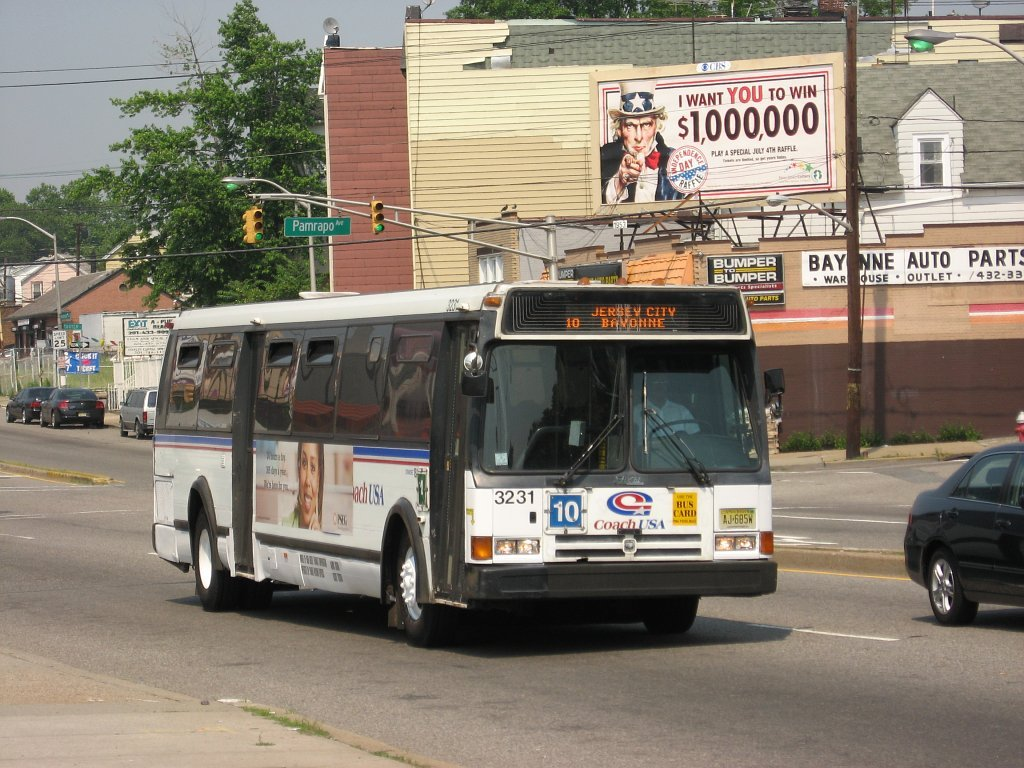
Pamrapo Avenue near the city line

The area overlapping the city line was earlier called Pamrapo. The name is a derivation of a phrase from the Algonquian language spoken by the Hackensack people, a phratry of the Lenni-Lenape who lived in the northeastern New Jersey at the time of European contact in the 17th century. A possible meaning could be rock or point of rocks which would refer to the terrain and the original ravine in Bergen Hill, or lower Hudson Palisades, found there. Spellings included Pimbrepow, Pembrepock, Pemmerepoch, Pimlipo, Pemrepau, Pemrapaugh, Pamrapough, Pamrepaw and Pamropo. Two streets, one in Greenville and another in northern Bayonne still bear the name. Patents for land Achter Kol (beyond the ridge) were issued in 1654, as an extension of the Pavonia, New Netherland settlement, which were centered on Communipaw and Harsimus. The Pamrapo Bank, founded in Bayonne in the 19th century, takes its name from this area. The Central Railroad of New Jersey maintained a station called Pamrapo along the right of way now used by the Hudson Bergen Light Rail.

== City line ==
While the original Lehigh Valley Terminal Railway tracks, New Jersey Route 185, New Jersey Turnpike Newark Bay Extension (I-78) create a physical boundary and de facto border with Bayonne the actual city cuts diagonally across the neighborhood along the route of the Morris Canal. The unusual path of the canal was made necessary by Bergen Hill, lower the Hudson Palisades. Travelling parallel to the base of the ridge it was cut through a natural break in the rock formation, and then travelled northwest to join the Hackensack River, a filled portion still seen in Country Village.

== Transportation ==
Merritt Street, a 0.14 miles (0.23 km) section of which part is designated Hudson County Route 707, is a short street in the neighborhood where Old Bergen Road and Ocean Avenue end and Avenue C begins. The street is terminus for New Jersey Transit Bus 6.

== See also ==
Odonyms in Hudson County, New Jersey
