= Hackensack River Greenway =

Trail along the lower Hackensack River and Newark Bay

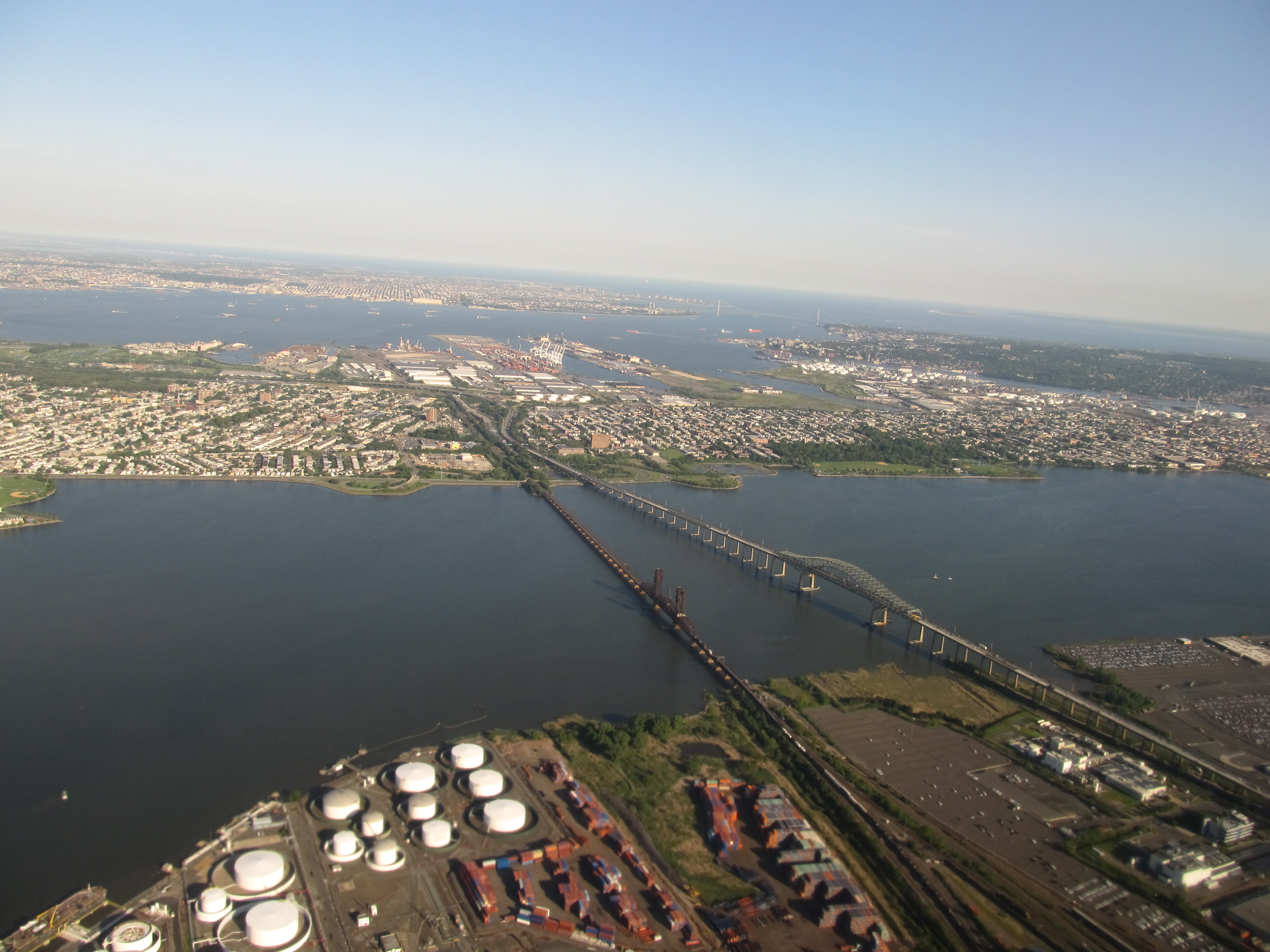
Newark Bay looking east to Jersey City and Bayonne

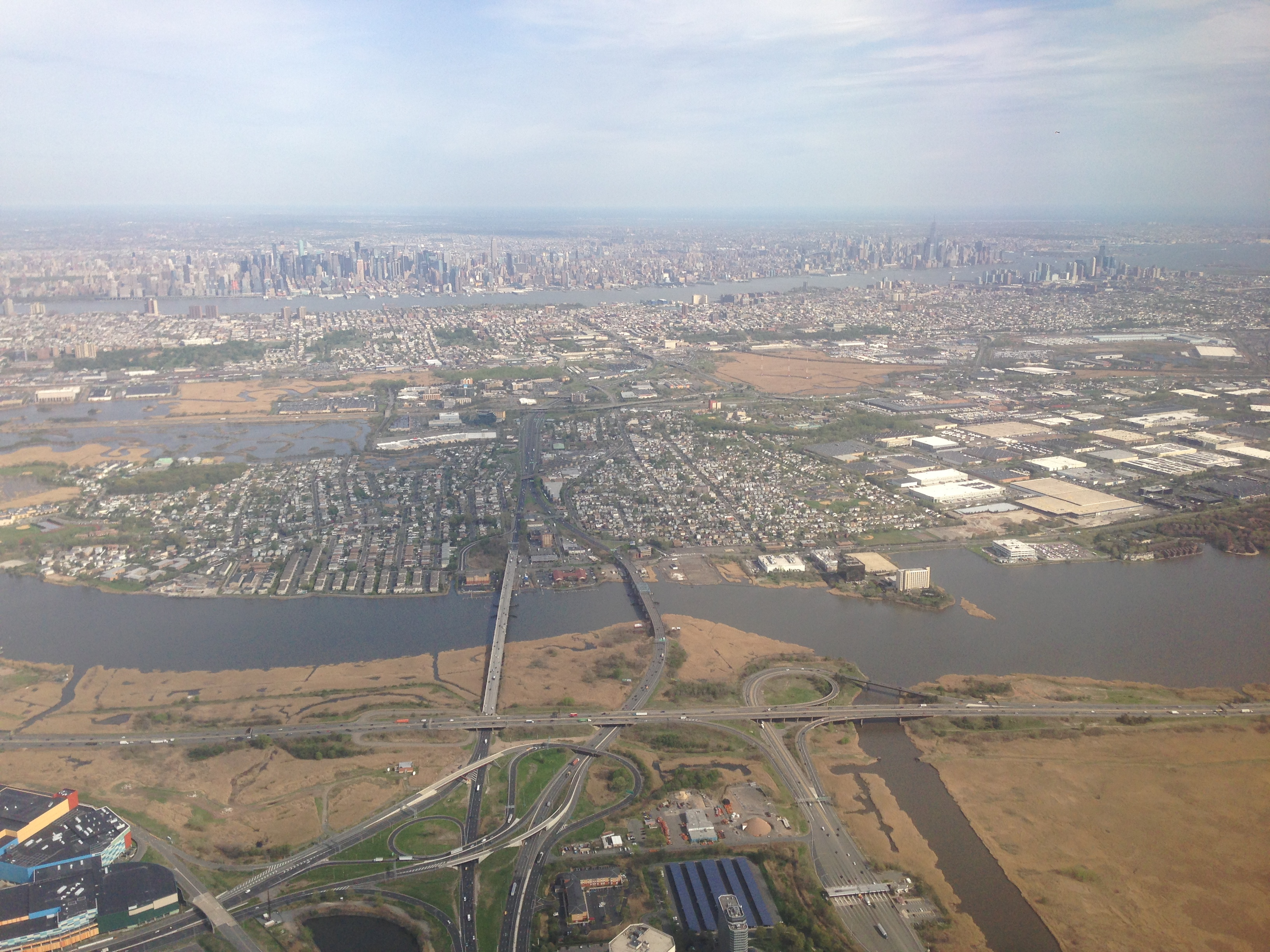
The Hackensack in Secaucus

Hackensack River Greenway, once known as the Hackensack RiverWalk, is a partially constructed greenway along the Newark Bay and Hackensack River in Hudson County, New Jersey, United States.

The 18-mile (29 km) linear park, which closely follows the contour of the water's edge where possible, runs along the west side of Bergen Neck peninsula between its southern tip at Bergen Point (40.644476°N 74.141422°W), where it would connect to the Hudson River Waterfront Walkway, and the Eastern Brackish Marsh in the north (40.801873°N 74.026798°W). The walkway passes through the contiguous municipalities of Bayonne (5.5 linear miles), Jersey City (5.6 linear miles), and Secaucus with a potential connection to a walkway in North Bergen. It passes through new and established residential neighborhoods, county and municipal parks, brownfields, industrial areas, commercial districts, and wetland preserves. While existing parks and promenades have been incorporated and new sections have been built there remain gaps. It will pass under sixteen bridges (some no longer in use) and cross over eight natural creeks. A section will run concurrently with the proposed Essex - Hudson Greenway and it will intersect with the proposed Morris Canal Greenway.

After a preliminary assessment in 2015, in September 2022 the Lower Hackensack was declared a federal superfund site, triggering a process to remediate and restore the water and shoreline.

Since 1988, in accordance with the public trust doctrine New Jersey law requires new construction built within 100 feet (30 m) of the water must provide 30 feet (9.1 m) of public space along the water's edge. In 2025, the Jersey City Municipal Council approved the creation of the "Hackensack River Greenway Overlay", new zoning mandates that developers building along the riverfront reserve at least 30 feet (9.1 m) of land for a public riverfront walkway to safely accommodate pedestrians and cyclists, equipped with lighting, seating, bike racks, landscaping and routine maintenance. Additionally, developers must provide public access points to the river every 300 feet (91 m).

The Hackensack River Greenway Through Teaneck is a National Recreation Trail which is not connected to the one in Hudson County.

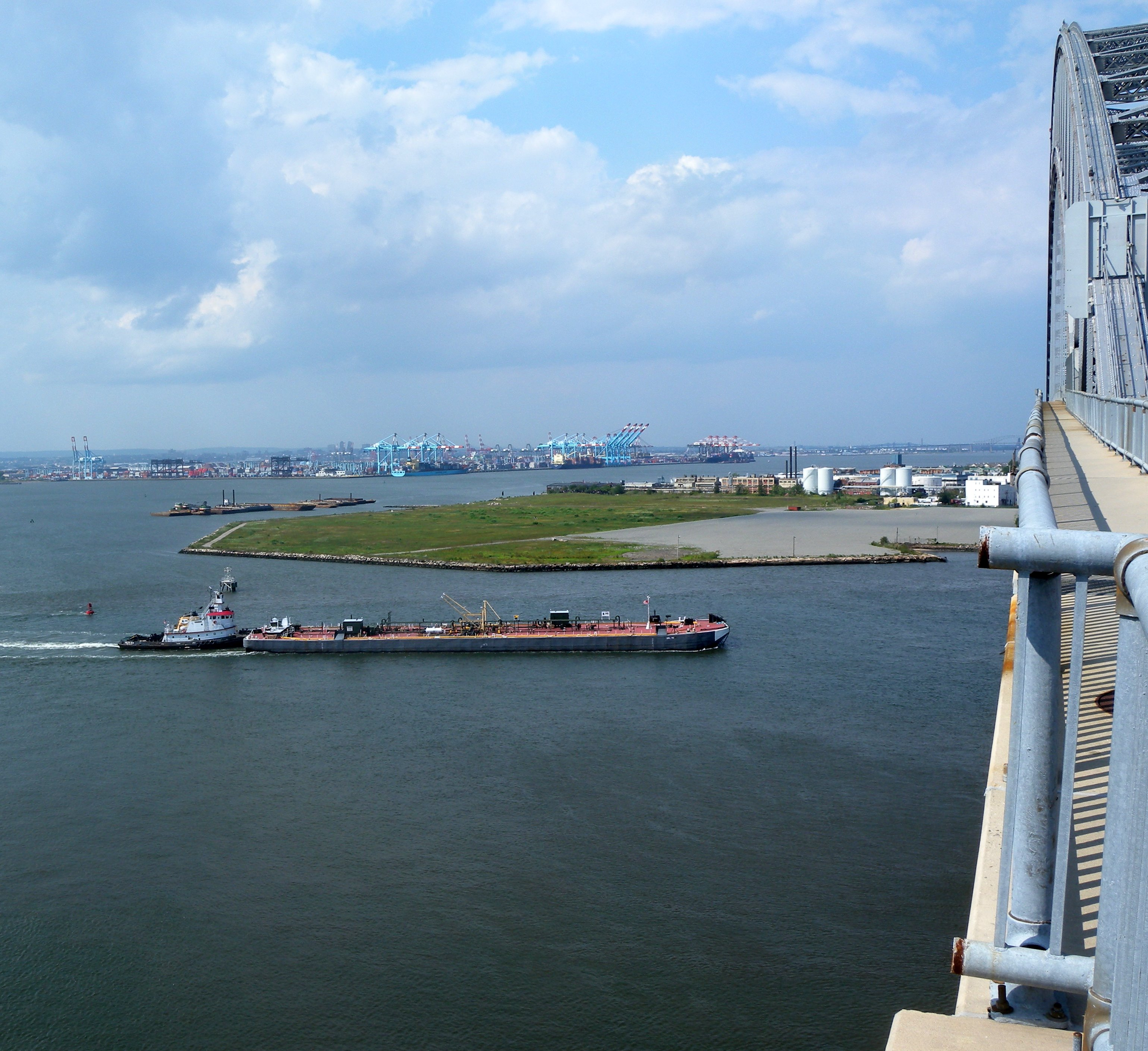
Bergen Point from Bayonne Bridge

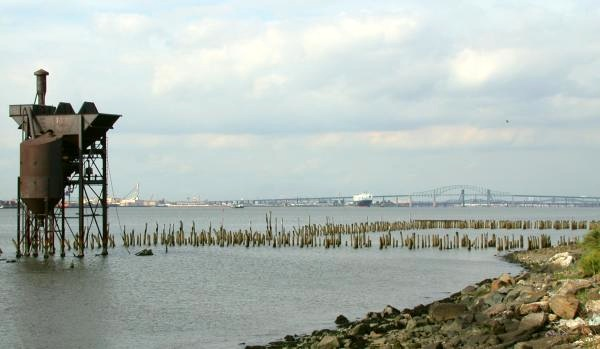
Newark Bay from Bayonne shoreline

== Route and points along walkway ==
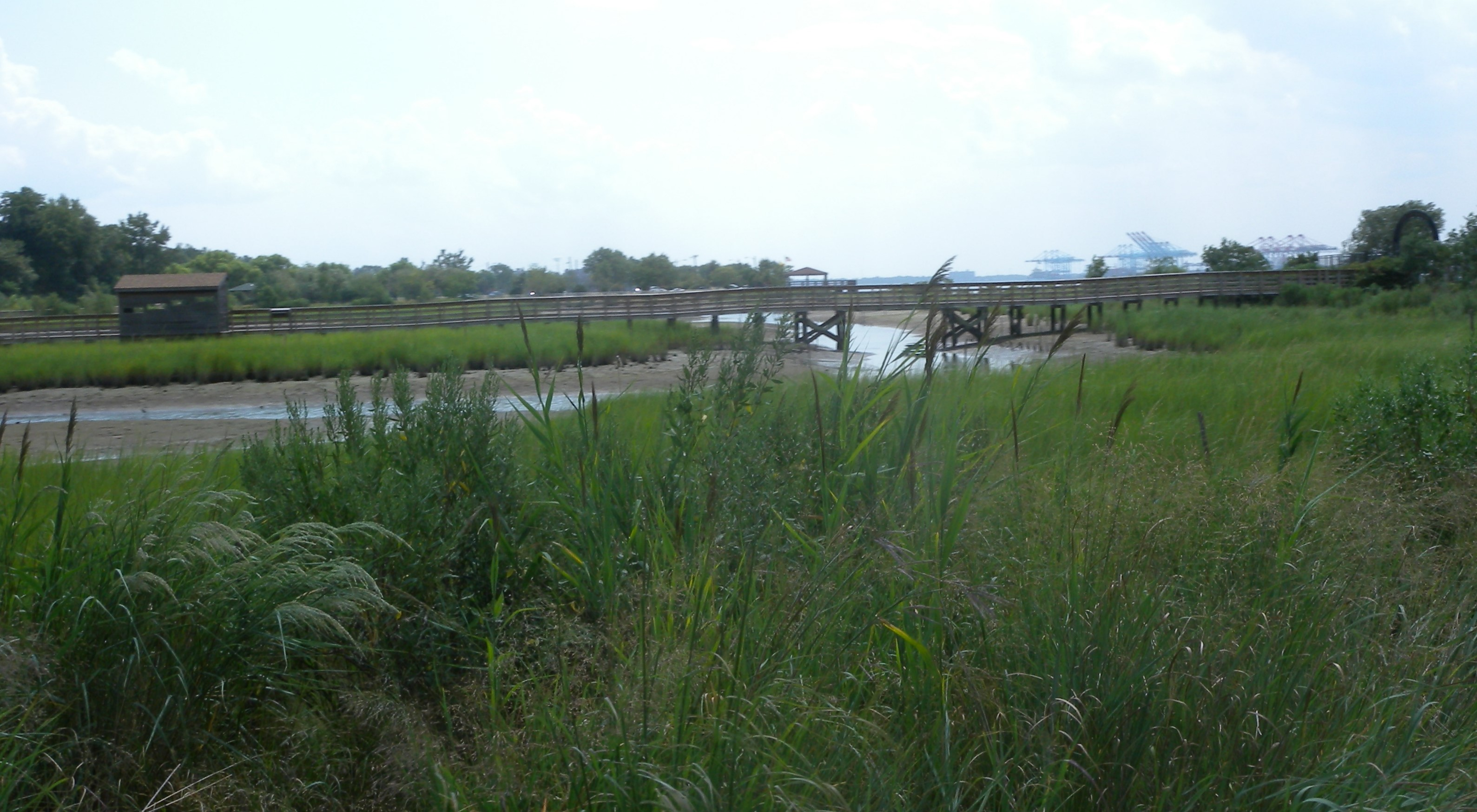
Rutkowski Park walkway

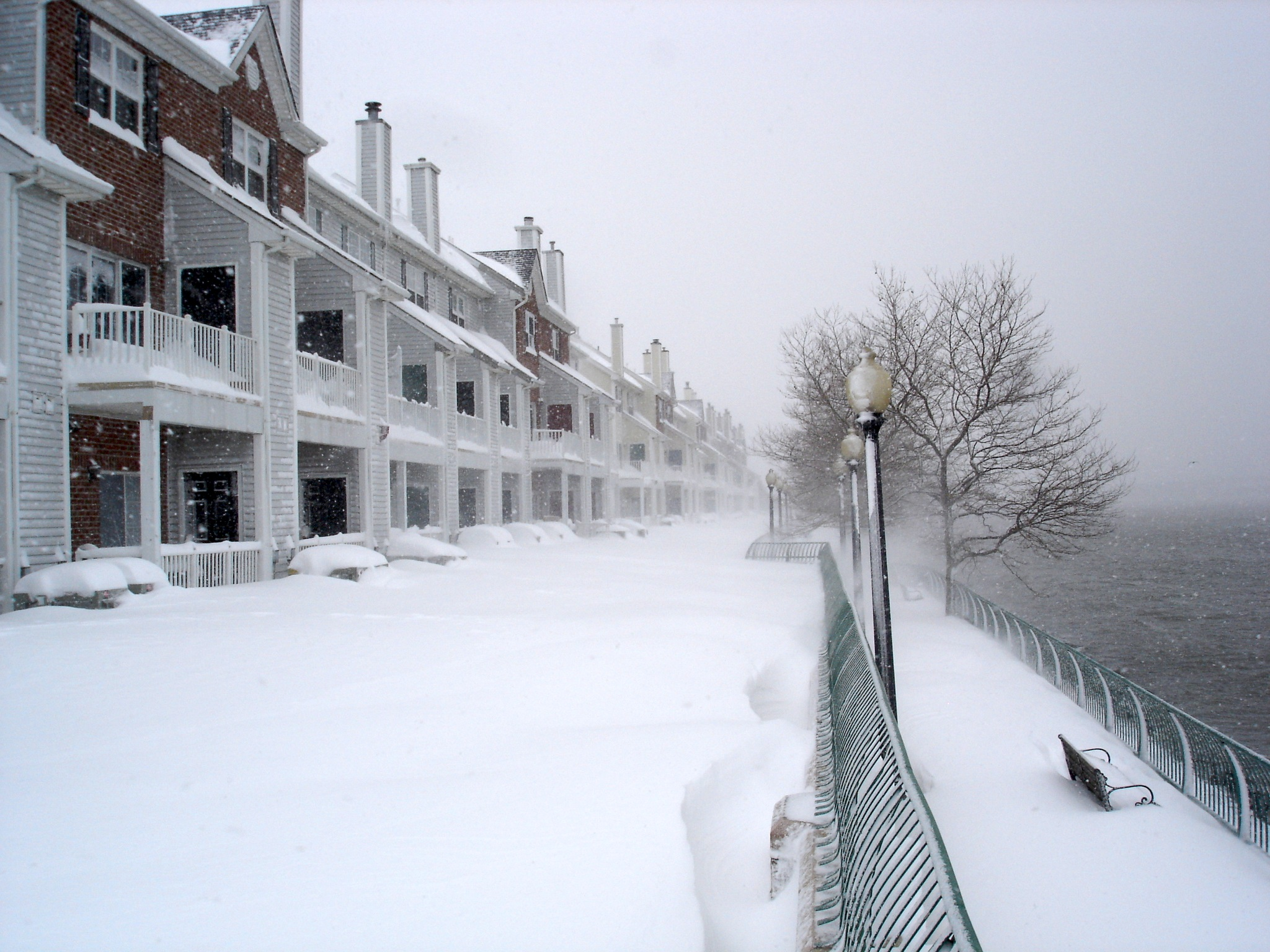
Promenade at Droyer's Point

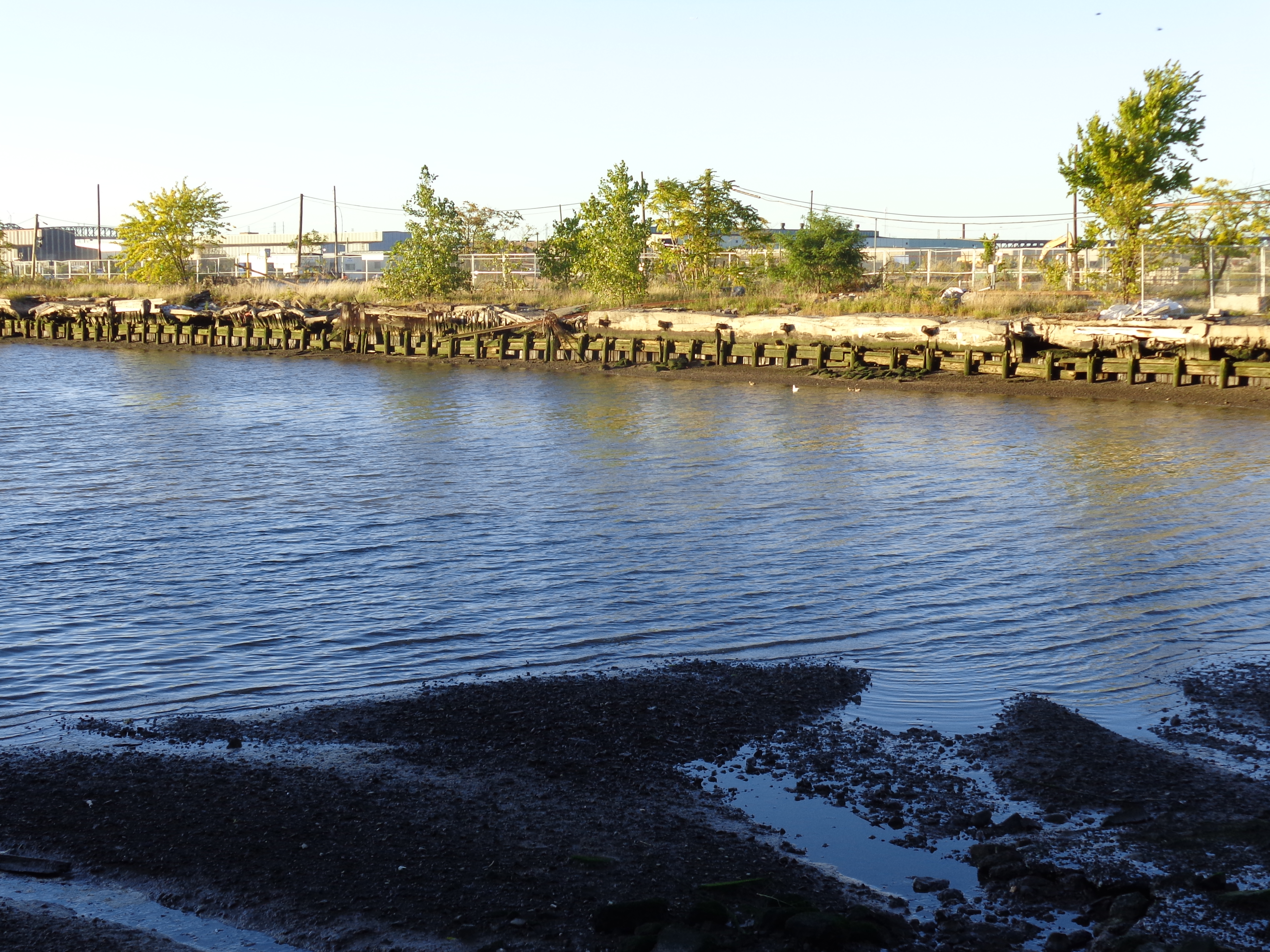
Cove between Droyers Point and Bayfront

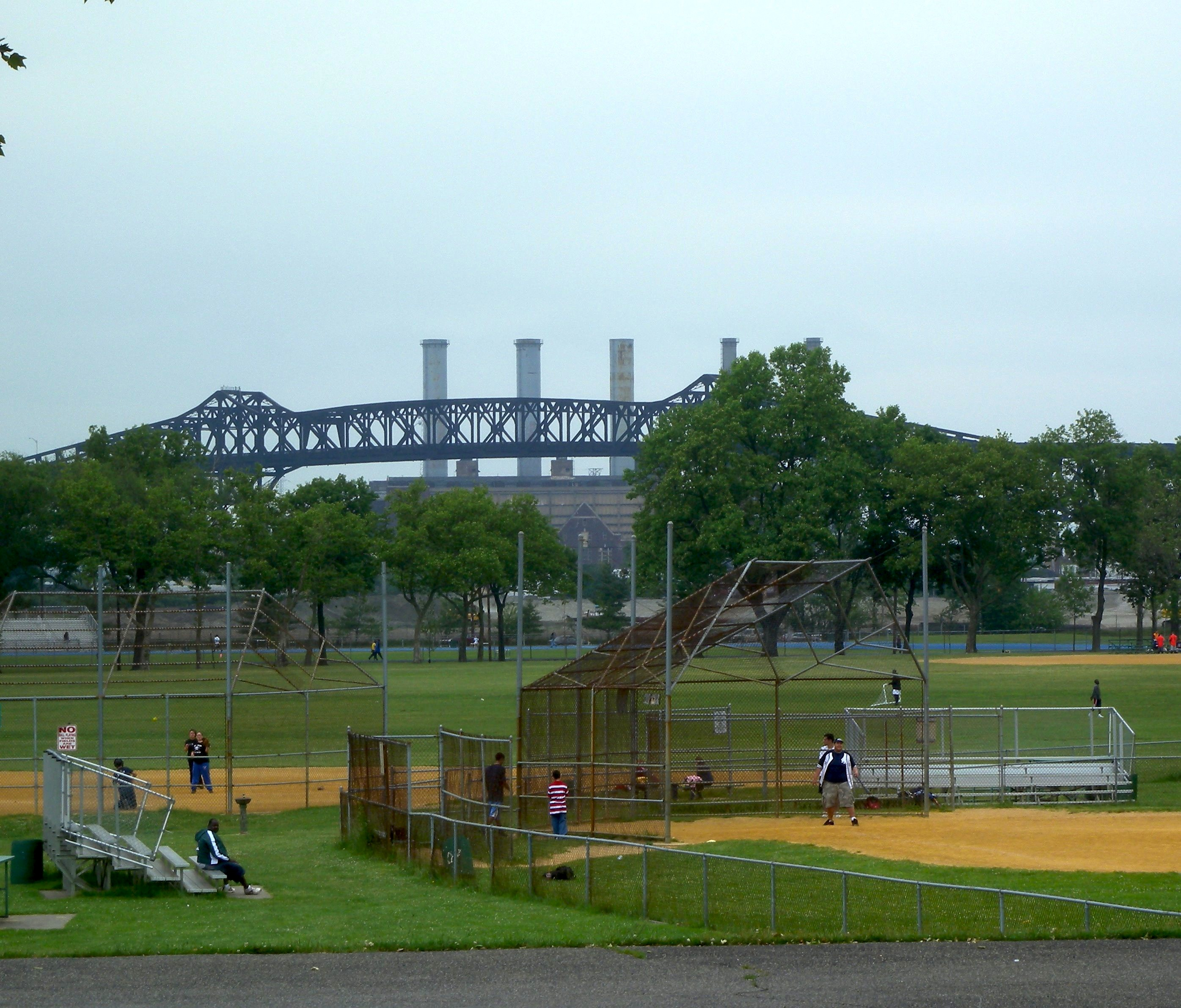
Lincoln Park and Pulaski Skyway

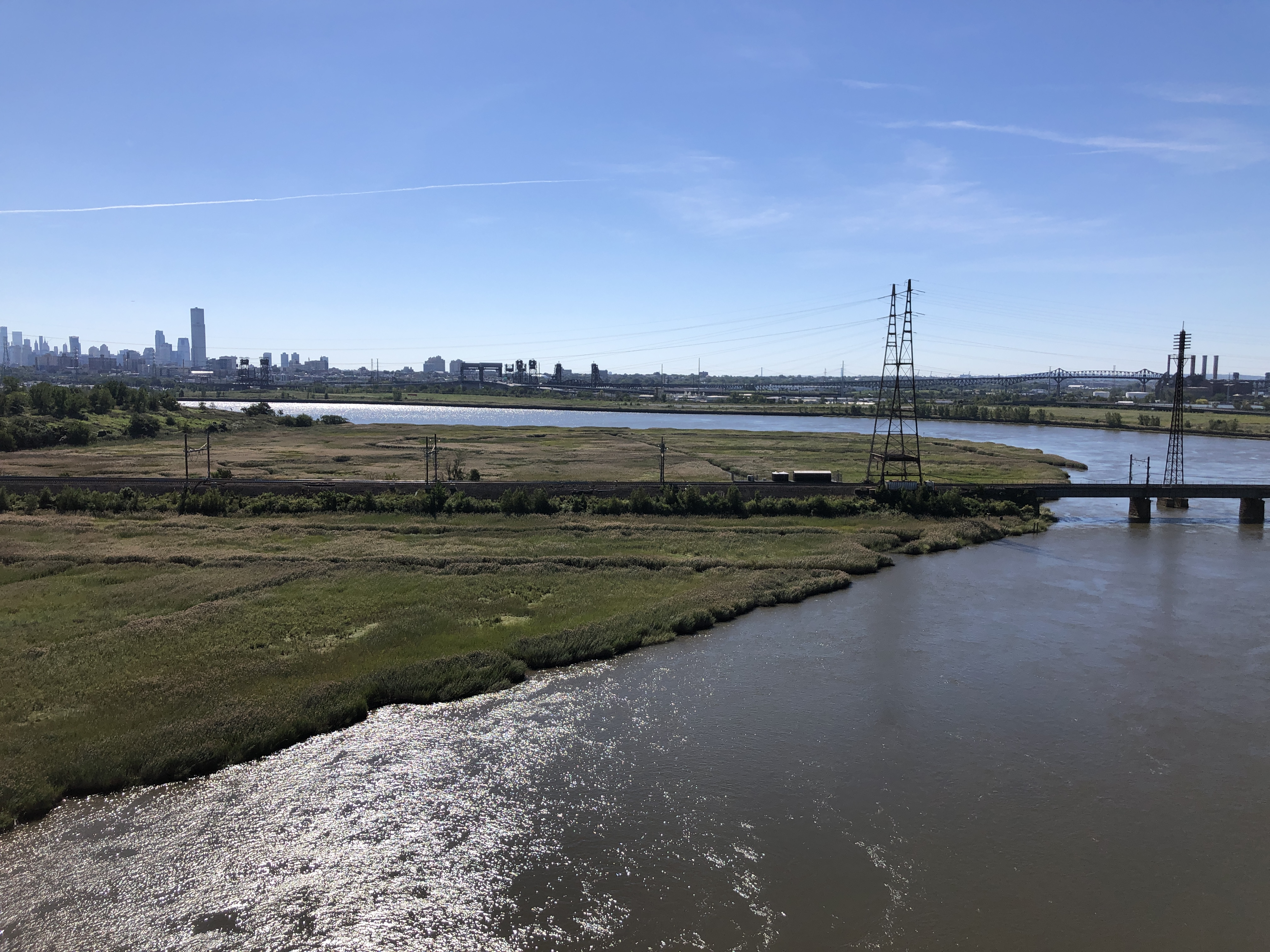
Riverbend Wetlands

- Collins Park along the Kill van Kull
- Bayonne Bridge
- Bergen Point
- 1888 Studios (proposed film studios)
- Bayview (proposed)
- Bayonne Luxury Waterwalk (proposed)
- Site of CRRNJ Newark Bay Bridge caissons
- Boatworks, former Electric Launch Company, promenade
- Robins Reef Yacht Club (private)
- 16th Street Park
- Don Ahern Veterans Memorial Stadium
- Bayonne High School
- Stephen R. Gregg Park—Bayonne Park
- Rutowski Park
- Route 440 south bound right-of-way
  - Newark Bay Bridge, part of New Jersey Turnpike Extension I-78
  - Lehigh Valley Railroad Bridge
- New Jersey City University Athletic Complex
- Droyer's Point promenade
- Bayfront (planned)
- Jersey City Municipal Utilities Authority facility
- Site of New York and Newark Railroad Bridge caissons
- Hudson Toyota/Hudson Nissan car dealerships
- Hudson Mall
- Morris Canal Lock 21 East (remnants) — Morris Canal Greenway (proposed)
- Western Gateway (proposed)
- Lincoln Highway Hackensack River Bridge/U.S. Route 1/9 Truck, aka Communipaw Avenue
- Lincoln Park West
- Hudson County Former Prosecutor's and Sheriff's Offices (Duncan Avenue)
- Pulaski Skyway
- Skyway Park
- Vertical Lift Historic District
  - PATH Lift Bridge (PATH)
  - Harsimus Branch Lift (CSX Transportation)
  - Wittpenn Bridge (New Jersey Route 7)
  - Lower Hack Lift (NJ Transit Rail Operations)
- Site of Hudson Generating Station
- Former NY&GL/NJT Boonton Line right of way — Essex - Hudson Greenway (proposed)
  - Penhorn Creek
  - Riverbend Wetlands Preserve
  - Portal Bridge (Northeast Corridor - Amtrak and NJ Transit)
  - New Jersey Turnpike Eastern Spur
- DB Draw - bridge de-commissioned (2002)
- Laurel Hill County Park
- Waterside at Exchange
- Meadowlands Parkway
  - Upper Hack Lift, for NJ Transit's Main Line and Port Jervis Line
  - Anderson Creek Marsh
  - HX Draw for NJ Transit's Bergen County Line and Pascack Valley Line
  - Harmon Cove
- Hudson Regional Hospital
- Mud Flats
- Harmon Plaza
- Snipes Park
- Route 3 Bridge (twin-span)
- Riverside Court
- Trolley Park, Oak Lane Park, Acorn Park Farm Lane Park
- Secaucus High School Marsh
- Mill Creek Point Park - 0.5 mile walking trail
- Mill Creek Marsh - 1.5 mile walking trail
- Harmon Meadow Plaza
- Cromakill Creek
- West Side Avenue/Eastern Brackish Marsh
  - Paunpeck Creek
  - Bellmans Creek

== Gallery ==
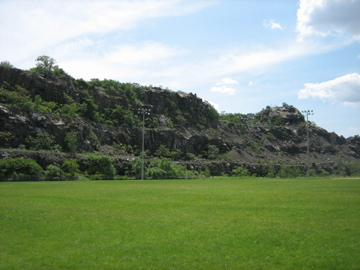
Snake Hill

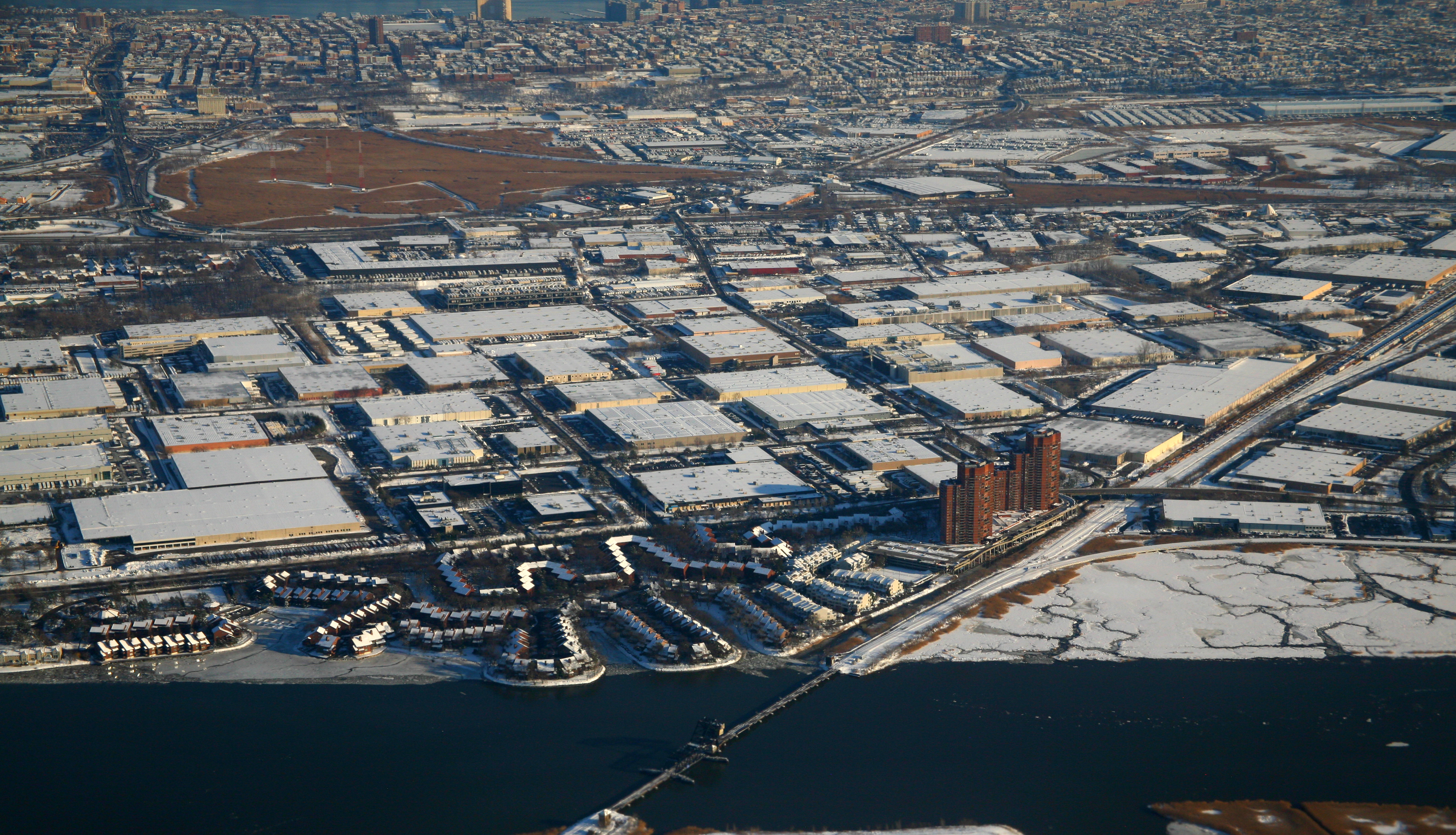
Harmon Cove and Anderson Marsh along Meadowlands Parkway

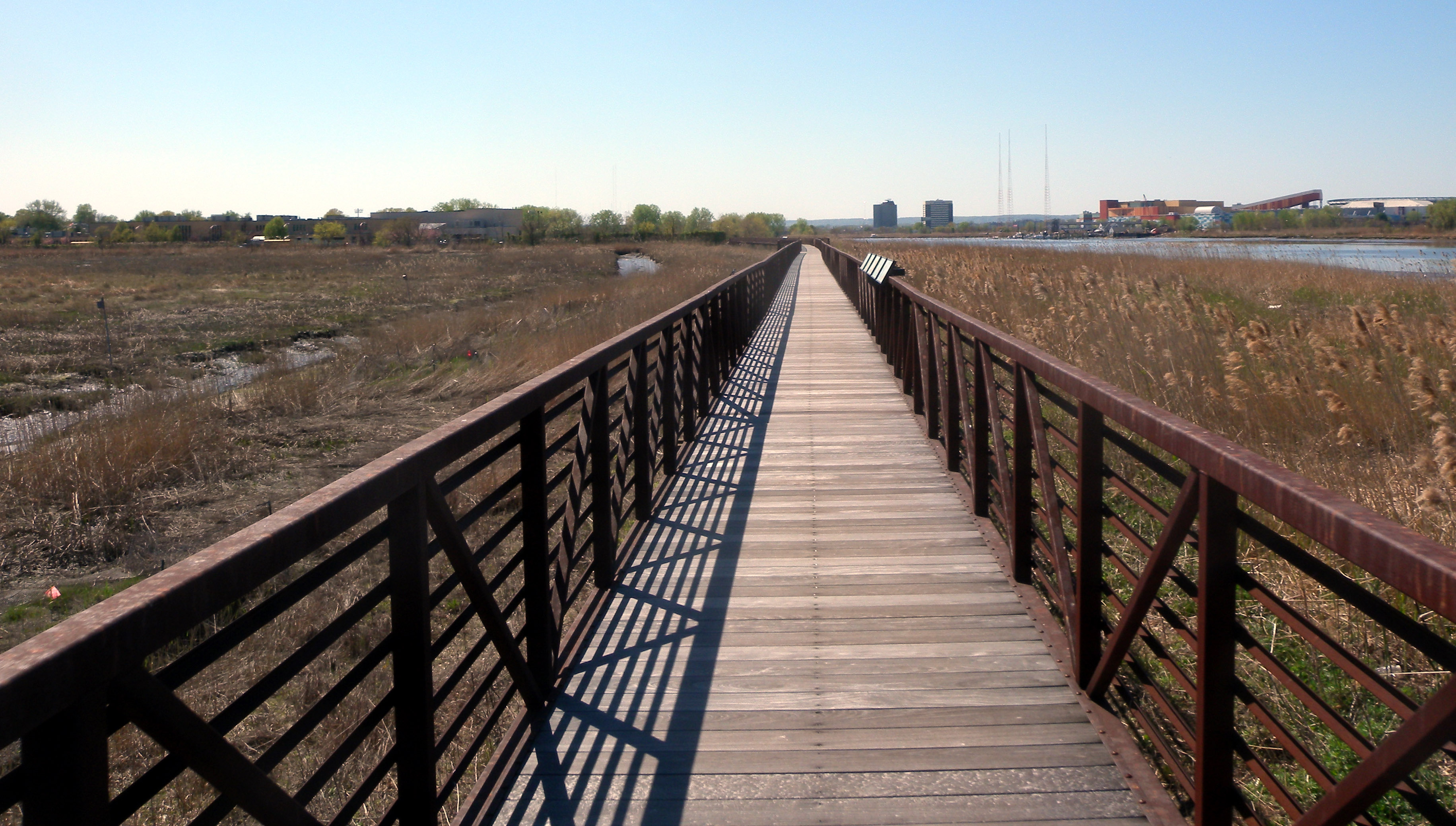
Mill Creek Point Boardwalk

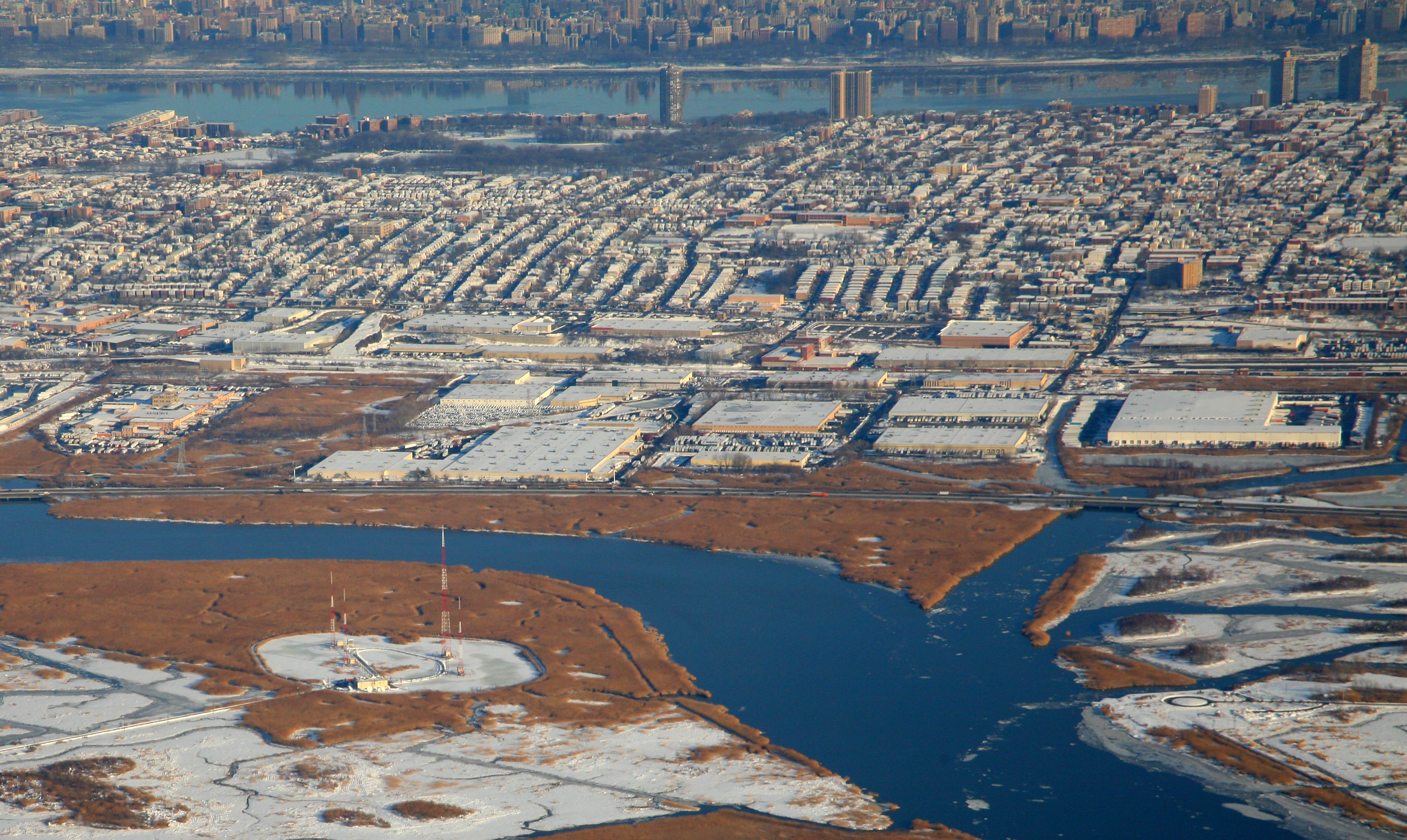
Western Brackish Marsh, Eastern Brackish Marsh, Mill Creek

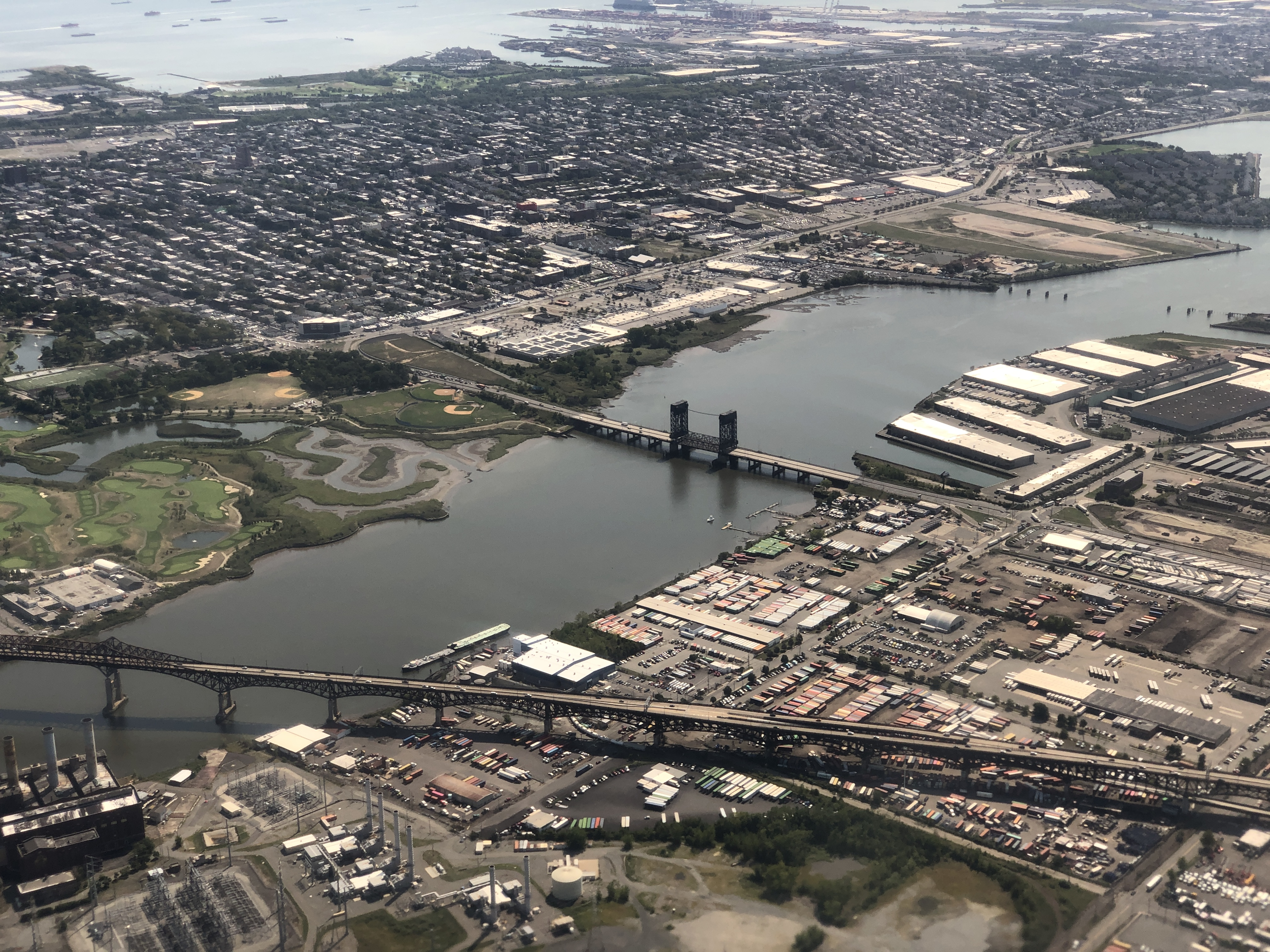
Jersey City south of Lincoln Park and south

== See also ==
- List of crossings of the Hackensack River
