= List of memorials to Martin Luther King Jr. =

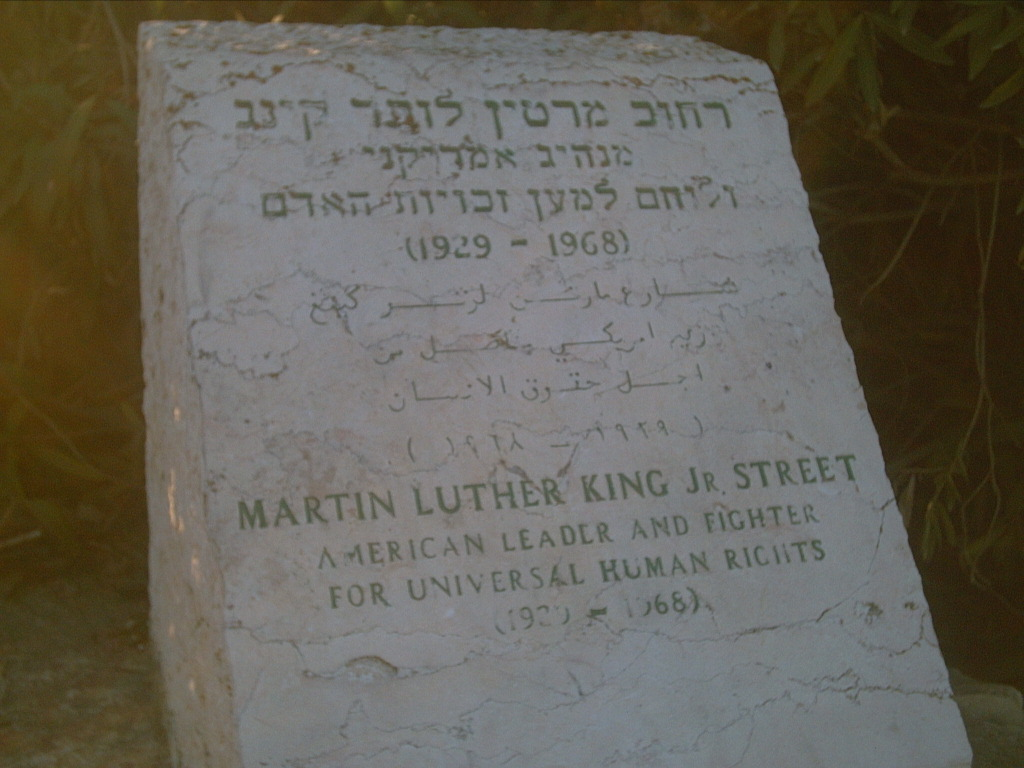
Martin Luther King Jr. Street at Liberty Bell Park in Jerusalem.

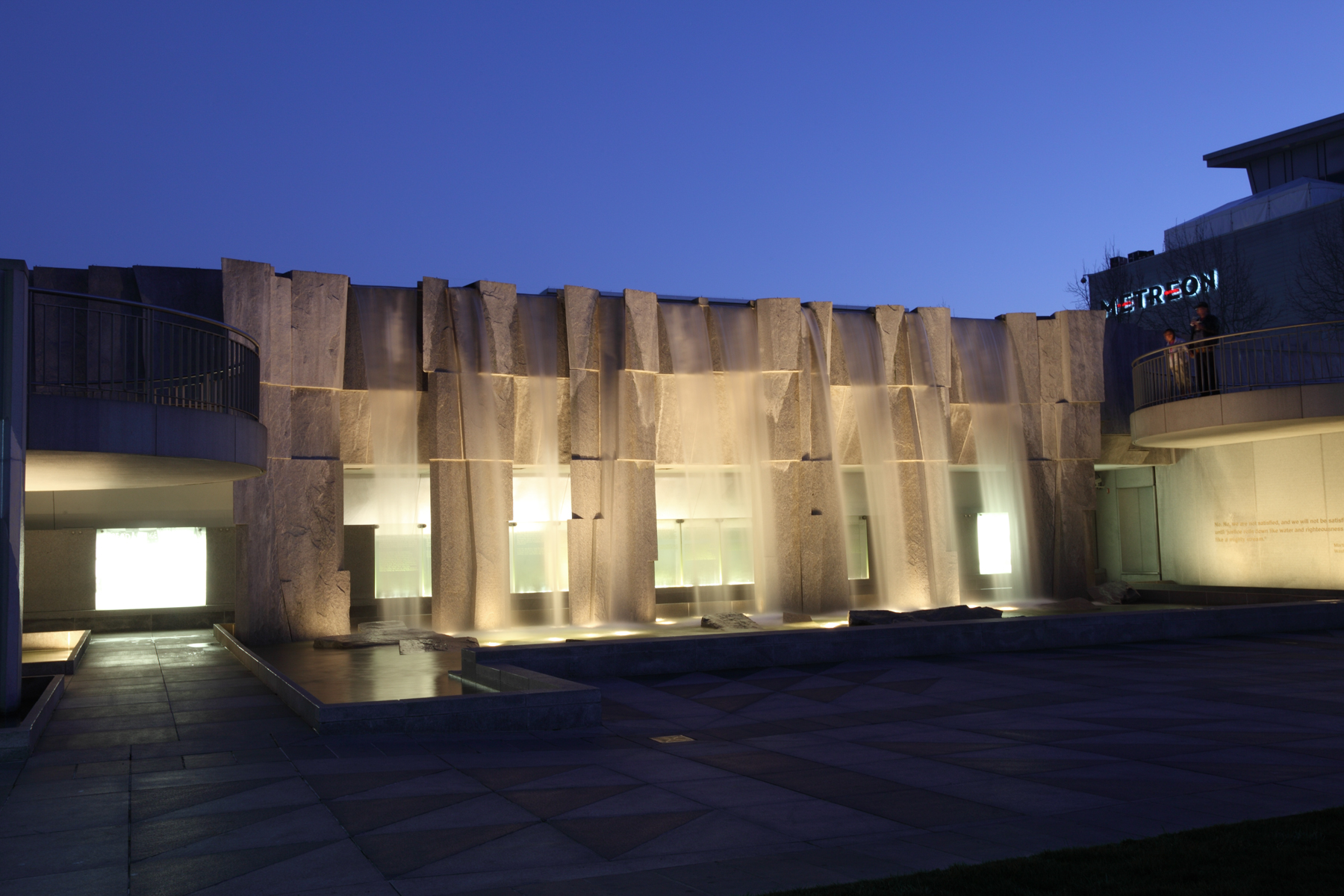
The Martin Luther King Jr. Memorial in Yerba Buena Gardens.

This is a list of memorials to Martin Luther King Jr.

== United States ==
There are numerous memorials to King in the United States, including:

=== Memorial sites ===
- In 1980, the U.S. Department of the Interior designated King's boyhood home in Atlanta and several nearby buildings the Martin Luther King Jr. National Historic Site.
- The Dr. Martin Luther King Jr. Memorial Gardens in Raleigh, NC feature a life-size sculpture of Dr. King and a 12-ton granite water monument honoring the area's civil rights leaders.
- King County, Washington, rededicated its name in his honor in 1986 and changed its logo to an image of his face in 2007.
- In 2012, the Dr. Martin Luther King Jr. Memorial Bridge was dedicated in Fort Wayne, Indiana.
- Martin Luther King Jr. College Preparatory High School in Memphis, Tennessee
- The Martin Luther King Jr. Promenade in San Diego, California
- The Martin Luther King Jr. Memorial Park in Kalamazoo, Michigan
- The Martin Luther King Jr. Memorial Bridge in Toledo, Ohio

=== Buildings ===
- The Martin Luther King Jr. Memorial High-rise Building for the elderly, McDaniel-Glenn housing project in Atlanta, Georgia.
- The Martin Luther King Jr. Memorial Library in Washington, D.C.
- The Dr. Martin Luther King Jr. Library in San Jose, California
- The National Civil Rights Museum, at the Lorraine Motel in Memphis, Tennessee, where King was assassinated.
- Brown Chapel A.M.E. Church in Selma, Alabama.
- The city government center in Harrisburg, Pennsylvania, is named in honor of King.

=== Sculptures ===
- Martin Luther King Jr. Memorial on the National Mall in Washington, D.C. King was the first African American and the fourth non-president honored with his own memorial in the National Mall area. In 1996, Congress authorized the Alpha Phi Alpha fraternity, of which King is still a member, to establish a foundation to manage fundraising and design of a national memorial to King. The memorial opened in 2011 and is administered by the National Park Service. The address of the monument, 1964 Independence Avenue, SW, commemorates the year that the Civil Rights Act of 1964 became law.
- The Landmark for Peace Memorial in Indianapolis, Indiana
- A bust of Dr. King was added to the "gallery of notables" in the United States Capitol in 1986, portraying him in a "restful, nonspeaking pose."
- The beginning words of King's "I Have a Dream" speech are etched on the steps of the Lincoln Memorial, at the place where King stood during that speech. These words from the speech—"five short lines of text carved into the granite on the steps of the Lincoln Memorial"—were etched in 2003, on the 40th anniversary of the march to Washington, by stone carver Andy Del Gallo, after a law was passed by Congress providing authorization for the inscription.
- The Embrace, unveiled in January 2023 in Boston
- The Homage to King sculpture in Atlanta, Georgia
- Hope Moving Forward statue in Atlanta
- The Statue of Martin Luther King Jr. in Atlanta
- The Dream sculpture in Portland, Oregon
- Martin Luther King, Jr. Memorial in Compton, California
- On October 11, 2015, the Atlanta Journal-Constitution reported a proposed "Freedom Bell" may be installed atop Stone Mountain honoring King and his "I Have a Dream" speech, specifically the line "Let freedom ring from Stone Mountain of Georgia."
- A bust of Martin Luther King Jr. has been in the collection of the Smithsonian Institution's National Portrait Gallery since 1974, and displayed in the White House since 2000; a second cast is in the collection of the National Museum of African American History and Culture.
- In Norfolk, Virginia stands a memorial in honor of King. The 83-foot-high granite obelisk was conceived by former Norfolk Councilman and General District Court Judge Joseph A. Jordan Jr.
- The Martin Luther King, Jr. Memorial at Yerba Buena Gardens in San Francisco is located behind a waterfall, which is the largest fountain on the West Coast. The King memorial consists of large, etched glass excerpts of King's speeches in the languages of San Francisco's sister cities, and also includes a large green space where performance arts events are held throughout the year. The entire memorial was a collaborative project between Sculptor Houston Conwill, Poet Estella Majoza and Architect Joseph De Pace. The memorial is located on the gardens' second block, between Howard and Folsom Streets, which was opened in 1998, with a dedication to Martin Luther King, Jr. by Mayor Willie Brown.
- The Martin Luther King, Jr Memorial at the Martin Luther King Drive station of the Hudson Bergen Light Rail in the Jackson Hill section of Jersey City, New Jersey includes a bust of King and accompanying bas reliefs.
- A memorial bust of Martin Luther King, Jr., which was approved by the King family, was officially unveiled at Martin Luther King, Jr. Park at Plant Riverside District in Savannah, Georgia on January 15, 2022. The bronze bust on a granite base is the first memorial to Martin Luther King, Jr. in Savannah.
- In 2010, a statue of Martin Luther King Jr., sculpted by Zenos Frudakis, was installed in the Martin Luther King Memorial Park adjacent to the J. Lewis Crozer Library in Chester, Pennsylvania. The statue is 5 feet (1.5 m) tall and 685 pounds (311 kg).
- Monuments featuring statues of King were revealed on November 19, 2024, in the adjacent cities of Benton Harbor (A Seat at the Table) and St. Joseph (The Mountaintop) in Michigan.
- A statue of King stands across the street from city hall in the city of Riverside, California

== Internationally ==
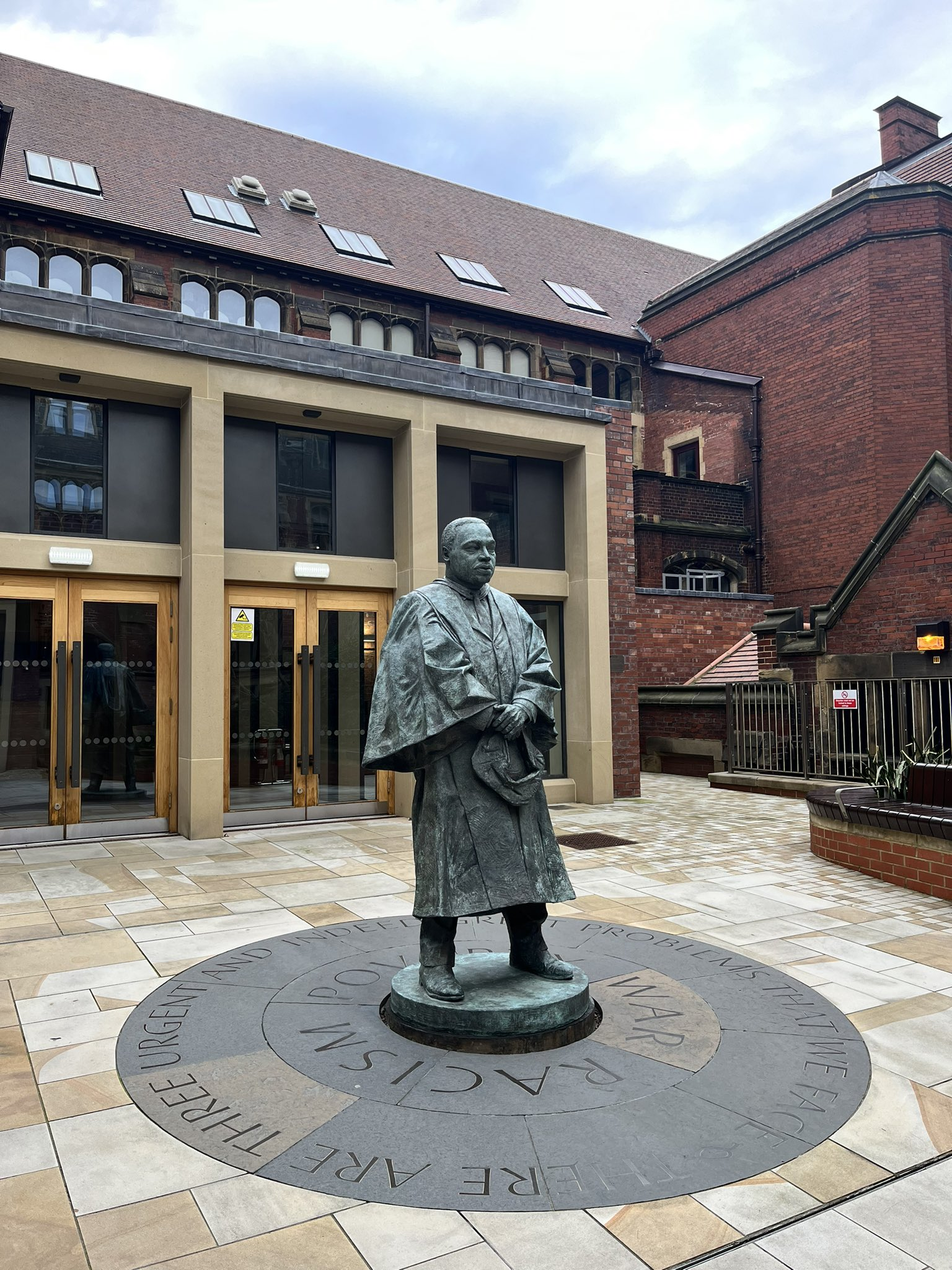
Dr Martin Luther King Jr. Statue at King's Quad courtyard of Newcastle University in North East England.

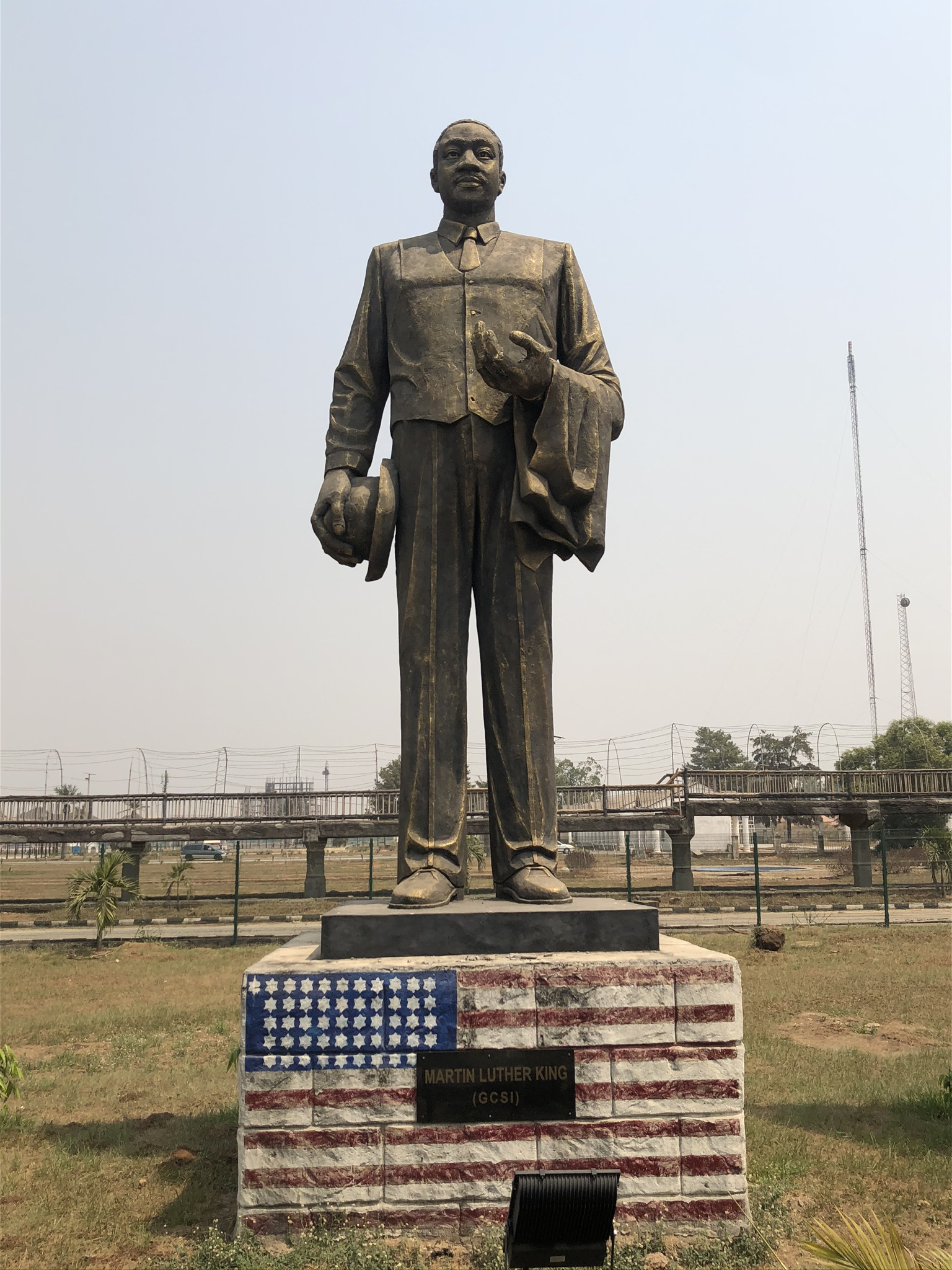
Statue of Dr. Martin Luther King Jr. in Imo state Nigeria

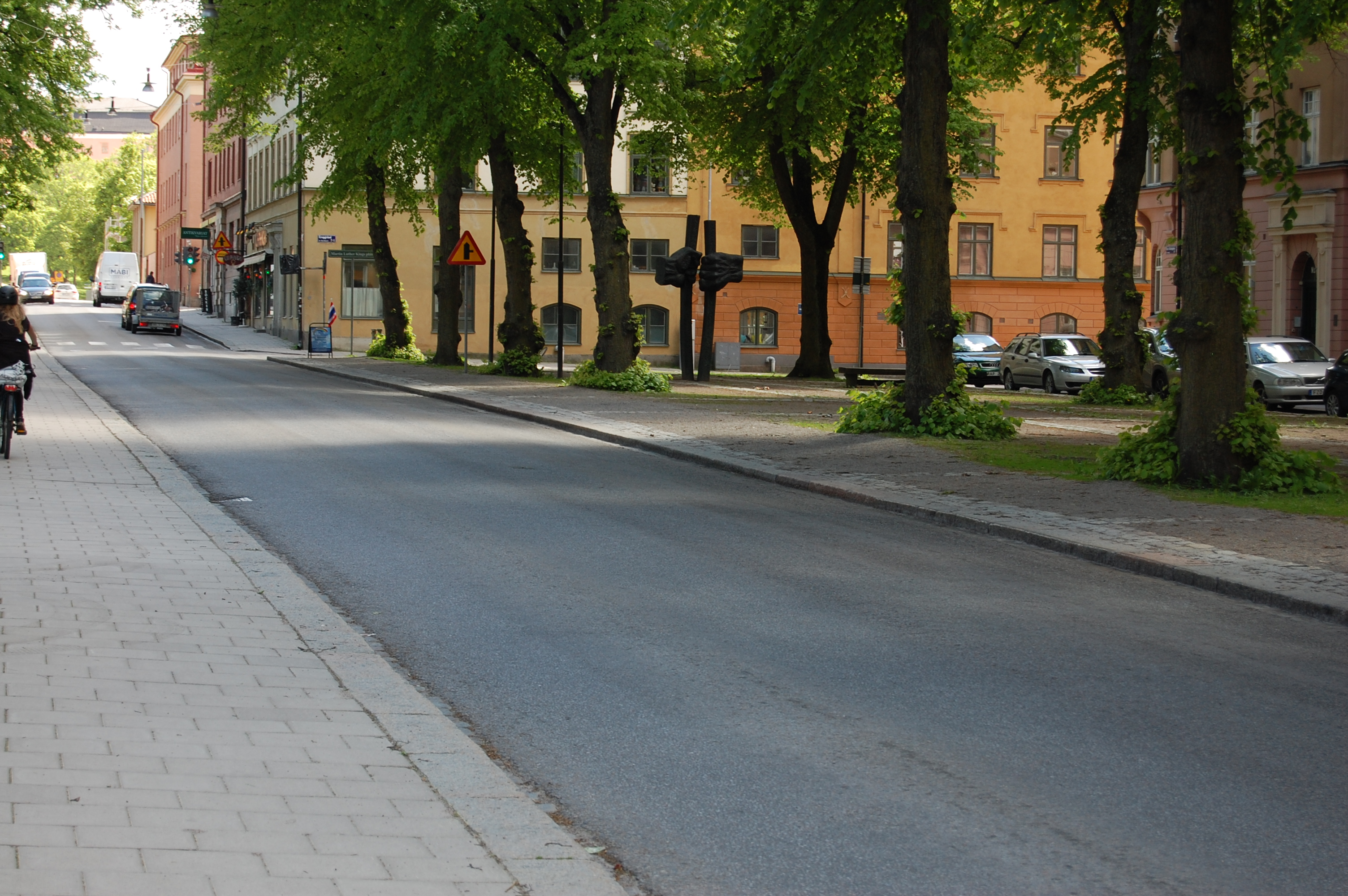
Befrielsen (English:Liberation) in "Martin Luther Kings plan" (park), Uppsala, Sweden

Numerous other memorials honor him around the world, including:

- Parc Martin Luther King, a 10 hectares (25 acres) park in Paris, France
- Dr Martin Luther King Jr. Statue at King's Quad courtyard next to the King's Hall of Newcastle University in North East England: A bronze statue was unveiled in November 2017 to mark the 50th anniversary of Dr Martin Luther King Jr.'s visit to the university to accept an honorary degree.
- "Martin Luther Kings plan" (park), with art installation Befrielsen (English: Liberation), in Uppsala, Sweden
- The Reverend Martin Luther King Jr. Church in Debrecen, Hungary
- The King-Luthuli Transformation Center in Johannesburg, South Africa
- The Rev. Martin Luther King Jr. Forest in Israel's Southern Galilee region (along with the Coretta Scott King Forest in Biriya Forest, Israel)
- The Martin Luther King Jr. School in Accra, Ghana
- The Gandhi-King Plaza (garden), at the India International Center in New Delhi, India
- One of the 10 statues of 20th-century martyrs on the façade of Westminster Abbey, London, UK
- Statue of Martin Luther King Jr. (Mexico City)
- The Martin Luther King Jr. Corner (library) at Sam Nujoma Multi-purpose Center in Ongwediva, Namibia

== See also ==
- Civil rights movement in popular culture
- List of streets named after Martin Luther King Jr.
