= Berry Lane Park =

Park in Jersey City, New Jersey, U.S.

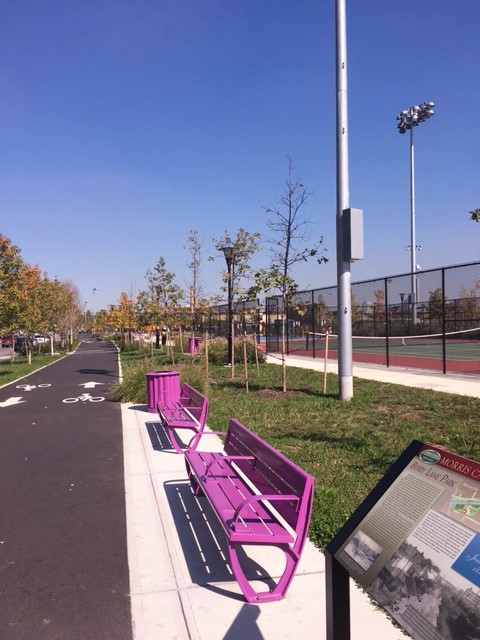
- Berry Lane Park along Garfield Avenue

- Location within Hudson County, New Jersey
- Interactive map of Berry Lane Park
- Location: Jersey City
- Coordinates: 40°42′44″N 74°04′03″W
- Area: 17.5 acres (0.071 km^{2})
- Created: November 2016
- Open: 2016

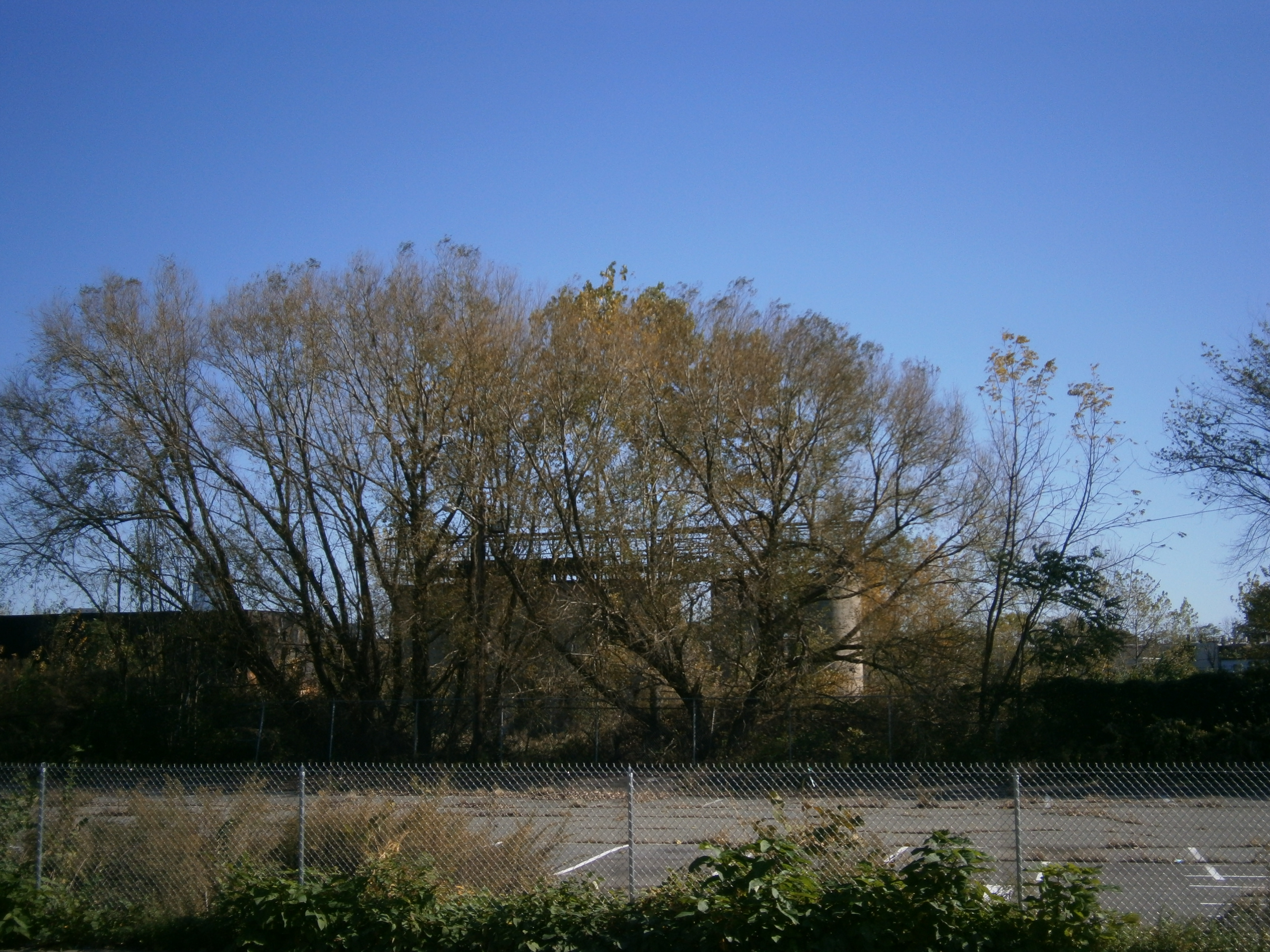
Site of Berry Lane Park in 2011 from Garfield Avenue with industrial silos in background

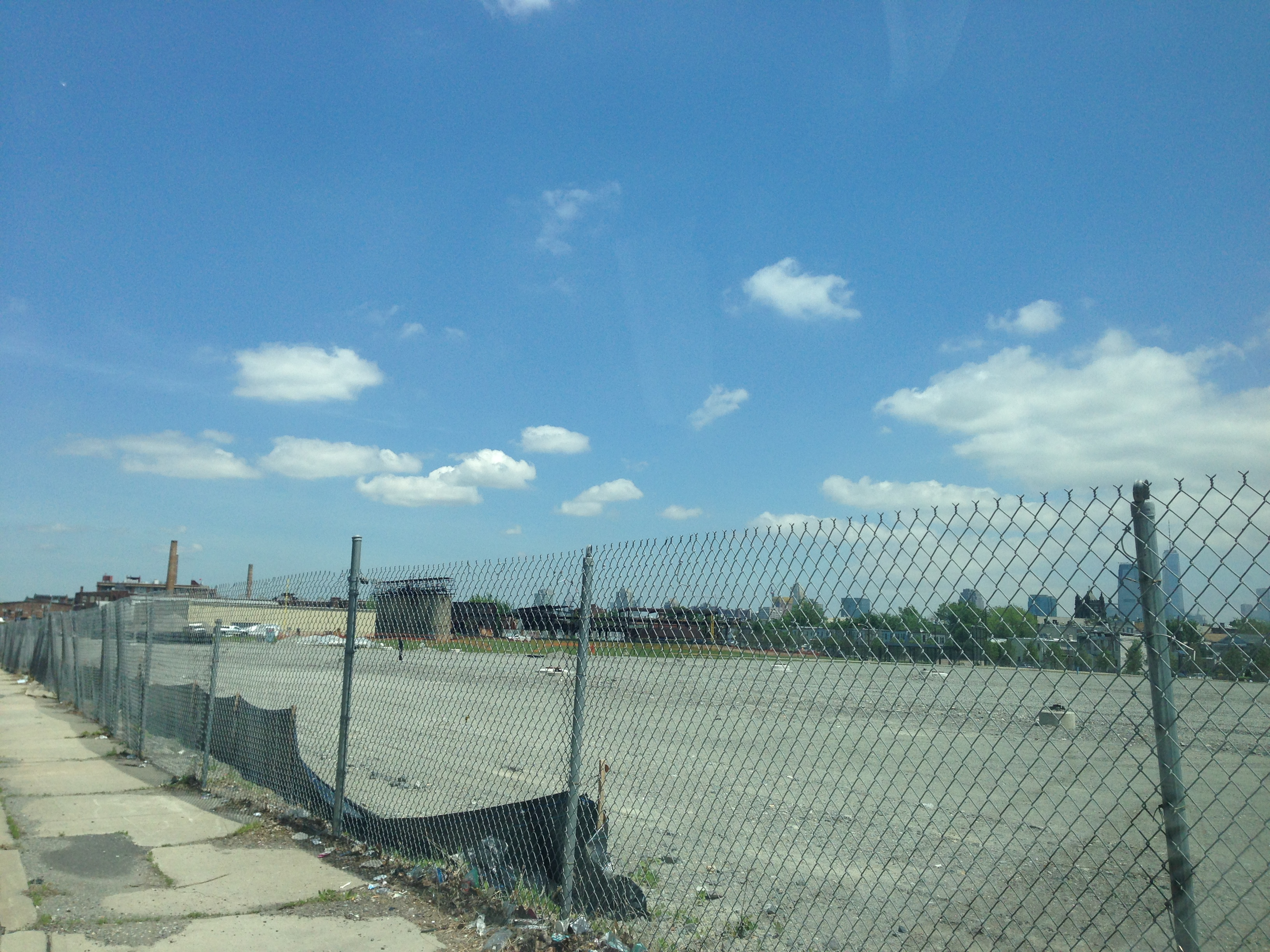
Berry Lane Park under construction looking east from Garfield Avenue (May 29, 2014)

Berry Lane Park is a park created on a 17.5 acres (0.071 km^{2}) of former brownfield site in the Communipaw-Lafayette Section of Jersey City, New Jersey. Construction of the park, which cost $38 million, began in 2012 and the park officially opened in June 2016. The park is located between Garfield Avenue and Woodward Street near the Garfield Avenue Hudson Bergen Light Rail station. Directly south of Berry Lane Park is Canal Crossing, an adjacent brownfield site slated for a future residential development. The park will be part of the greenway planned along the former route of the Morris Canal.

Berry Lane Park is one of the largest municipal parks in Jersey City. Features include two basketball courts, two tennis courts, a baseball field, a soccer field, a playground, a rain garden, 600 new trees, and a splash pad water park. New park features coexist with older existing structures that have been preserved or modified.

The park takes its name from Berry Lane, a small thoroughfare created from property acquired by the city from the Central Railroad of New Jersey in 1955 and named for then-Mayor Bernard J. Berry.

The Berry Lane Park project site includes 11 properties formerly used as rail yards, auto repair shops, industrial facilities, and warehouses. The site required significant environmental investigation and remediation due to petroleum and heavy metal contamination. A former chromium processing plant operated by PPG Industries caused substantial Hexavalent chromium contamination on the Berry Lane Park property and other adjacent properties, but PPG Industries agreed to remove 700,000 tons of hazardous waste from this and several other sites in the area.

Post-environmental remediation construction began on Wednesday August 22, 2012. The first and second phases of the project included final environmental remediation of contaminants and grading of the land as well as construction of the baseball field, and irrigation systems. The third phase of the project, which included installation of over 100 high-efficiency lights throughout the park, began in April 2014. The fourth phase of the project, which included completion of the turf baseball and soccer fields as well as construction of event spaces, began during the summer of 2014. The final phase of construction, which included concessions facilities, restrooms, basketball courts, a dog run, and other smaller park features, began after the fourth phase is complete. In October 2014, Jersey City received a $5 million grant from the New Jersey Economic Development Authority that will facilitate completion of a large portion of the park in a single phase. The park officially opened to the public in June 2016.

Funding for the project includes grants from the United States Environmental Protection Agency (EPA), the New Jersey Economic Development Authority, Hudson County, a Community Development Block Grant from the U.S. Department of Housing and Urban Development, and the New Jersey Department of Environmental Protection (NJDEP).

At the grand opening of the park, Jersey City, New Jersey mayor Steven Fulop announced a grant from the Tony Hawk Foundation to build a skate park. A new baseball field opened in October 2016. The skatepark opened in August 2020.

== See also ==
- Whitlock Cordage
- Canal Crossing
- PJP Landfill
