= Jackson Avenue station =

Jackson Avenue station can refer to:

- Jackson Avenue station (IRT White Plains Road Line), a New York City Subway station on the 2 and 5 trains
- Martin Luther King Drive station, a Hudson–Bergen Light Rail station formerly known as Jackson Avenue
- Vernon Boulevard–Jackson Avenue station, a New York City Subway station on the 7 and <7> trains
