= Working on the Statue of Liberty =

1946 painting by Norman Rockwell

Working on the Statue of Liberty (Statue of Liberty)
- Artist: Norman Rockwell
- Year: 1946
- Medium: Oil on canvas
- Dimensions: 54.61 cm × 43.02 cm (21 1/2 in × 16 15/16 in)
- Location: White House

Working on the Statue of Liberty, also known as Statue of Liberty, is a 1946 oil painting by American illustrator Norman Rockwell, showing workmen cleaning the torch held aloft by the Statue of Liberty (Liberty Enlightening the World) in New York Harbor.

== Creation ==
The painting was created for the cover of an edition of The Saturday Evening Post, published on 6 July 1946, from sketches that Rockwell made in March 1946. It depicts the cleaning of the amber-coloured glass of the torch, an operation undertaken annually each July. Rockwell focuses on just a small part of the Statue of Liberty – the torch, a 42 feet (13 m) long arm, and part of the head of the colossal statue, silhouetted against a clear summer blue sky. Five workmen are attached to the statue by ropes, including one who is a caricature of Rockwell himself, and one African-American in a red shirt. The inclusion of a non-white figure working with whites, apparently only noticed in 2011, contravened a Saturday Evening Post policy of only showing people of ethnicity in subservient roles.

== Display in the Oval Office ==
The painting came into the possession of Steven Spielberg, who donated it to the permanent art collection of the White House in 1994. It was displayed in the Oval Office during the administrations of Bill Clinton, George W. Bush, and Barack Obama, sometimes to the left of the President's desk, above a cabinet or table on which was displayed Frederic Remington's sculpture The Bronco Buster. It was later moved by Obama to a position next to the fireplace, above a bust of Martin Luther King Jr. In January 2017, shortly after the inauguration of Donald Trump, the painting was still in the Oval Office. It was reportedly removed later in 2017, in favor of a portrait of Andrew Jackson. In his Farewell Speech to the nation, Joe Biden referenced the image as part of his memories of his time in the White House.

Statue of Liberty in the Oval Office
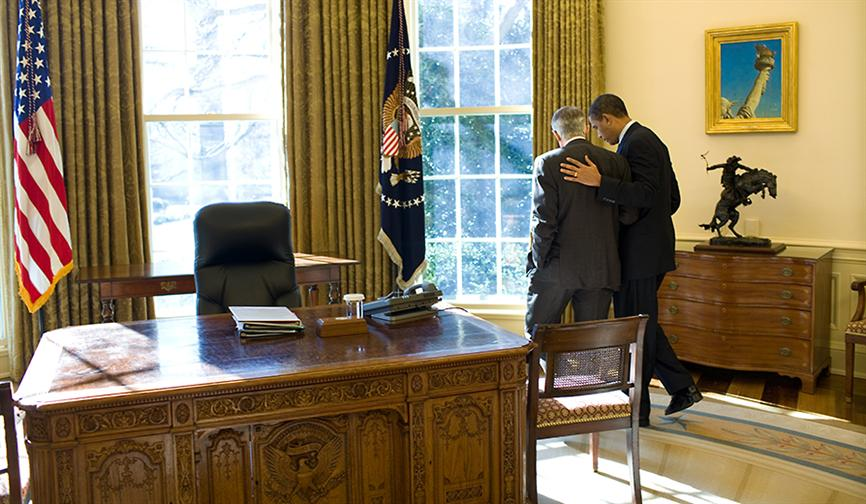
The painting in 2009, at right, near the Resolute desk, above Frederic Remington's sculpture The Bronco Buster

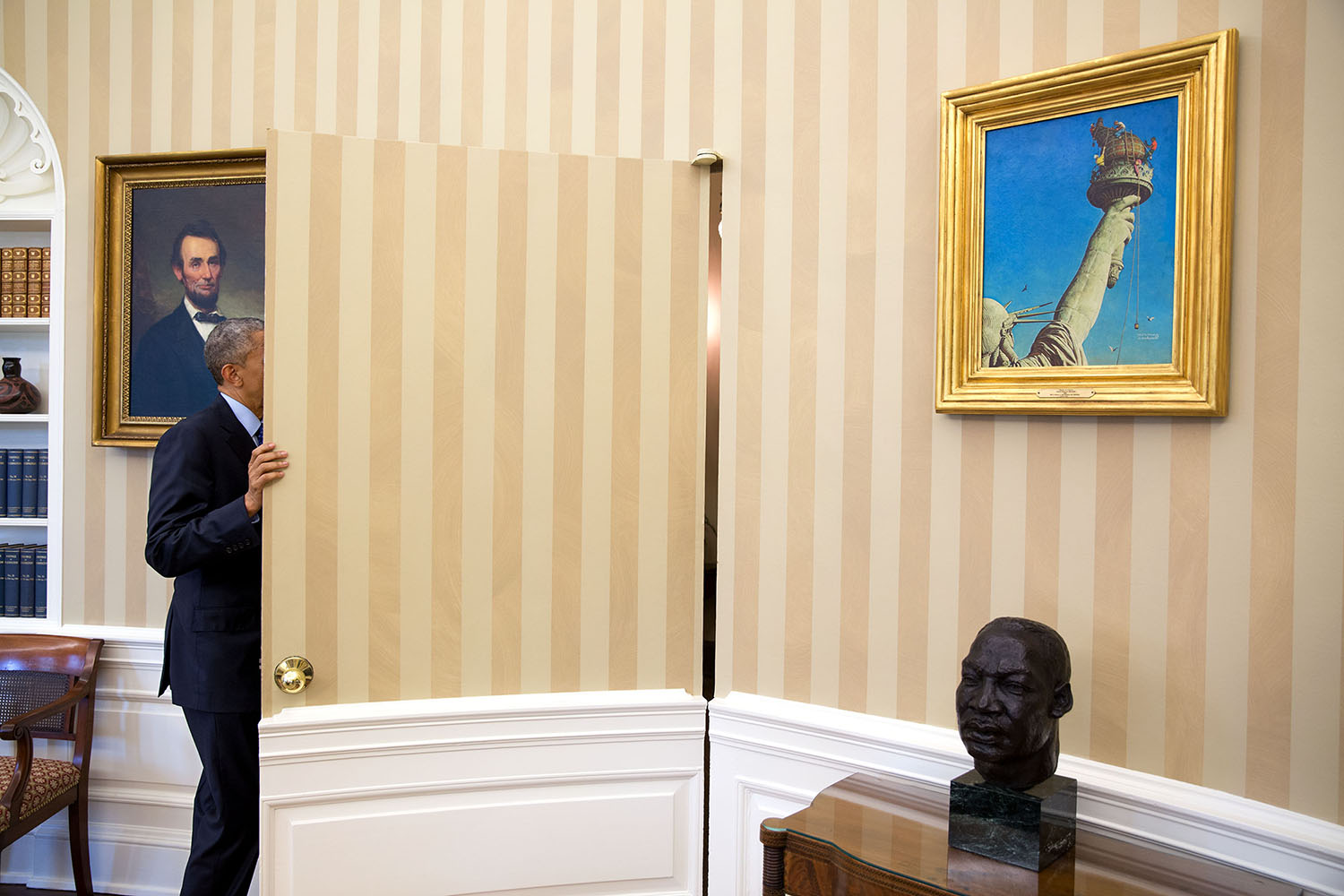
The painting in 2015, hung above a bust of Martin Luther King by Charles Alston

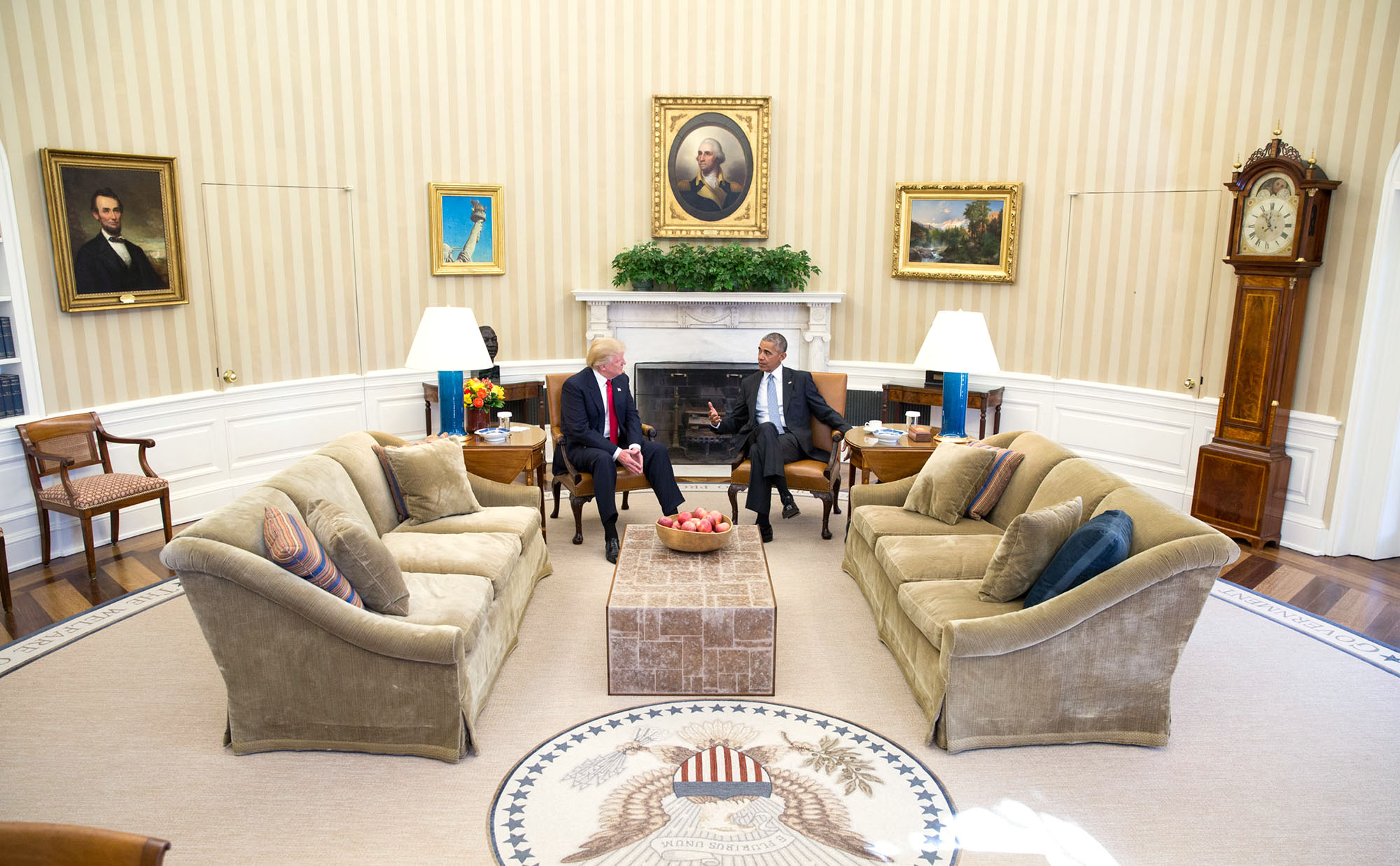
The painting in November 2016, seen during a meeting of President Obama and President-elect Trump

== See also ==
- Art in the White House
