= Canal Crossing, Jersey City =

Populated place in Hudson County, New Jersey, US

Coordinates: 40.7068°N 74.0685°W

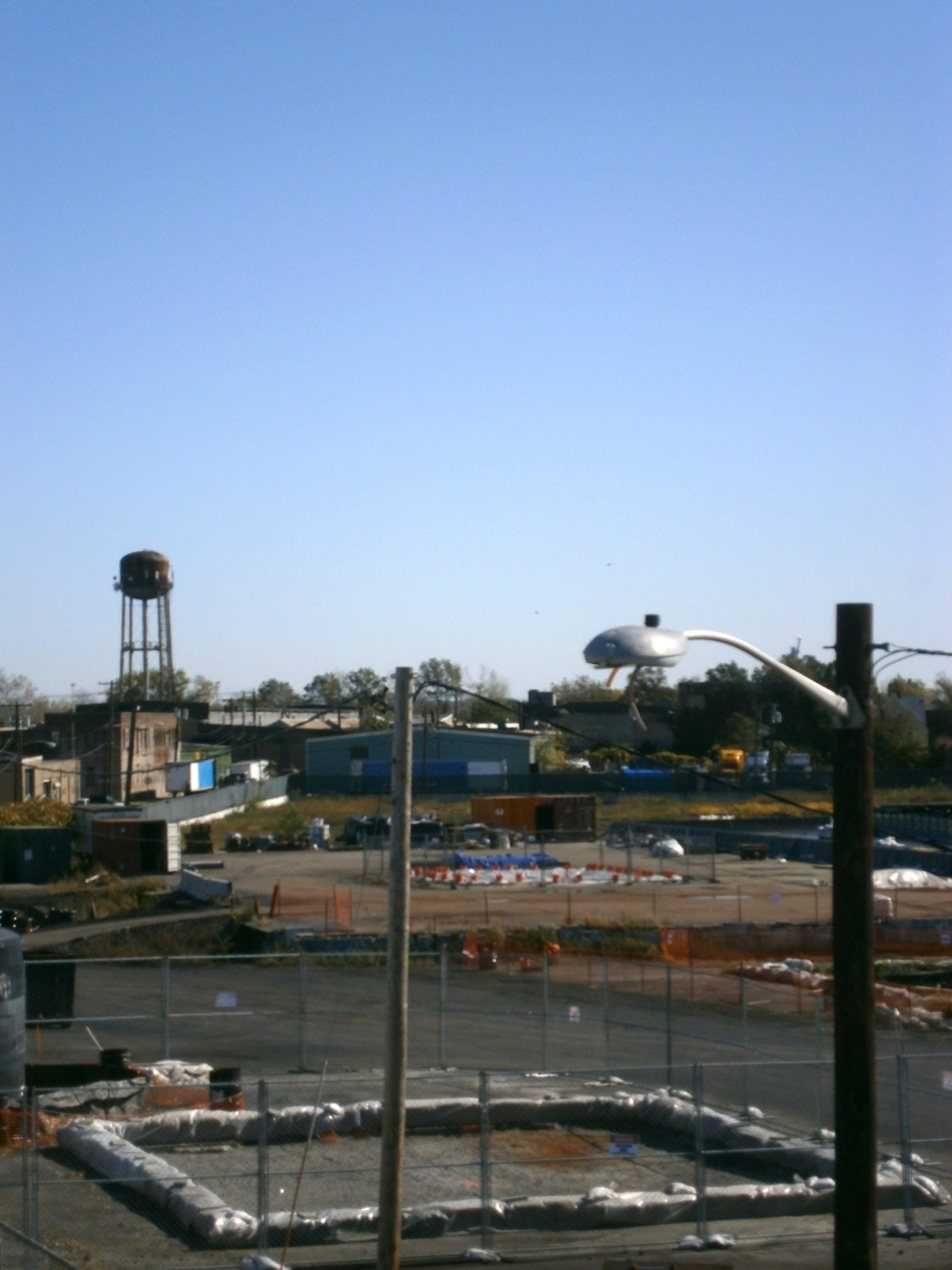
Remediation of soils with high chromium toxicity at PPG site as seen from Garfield Avenue HBLR station

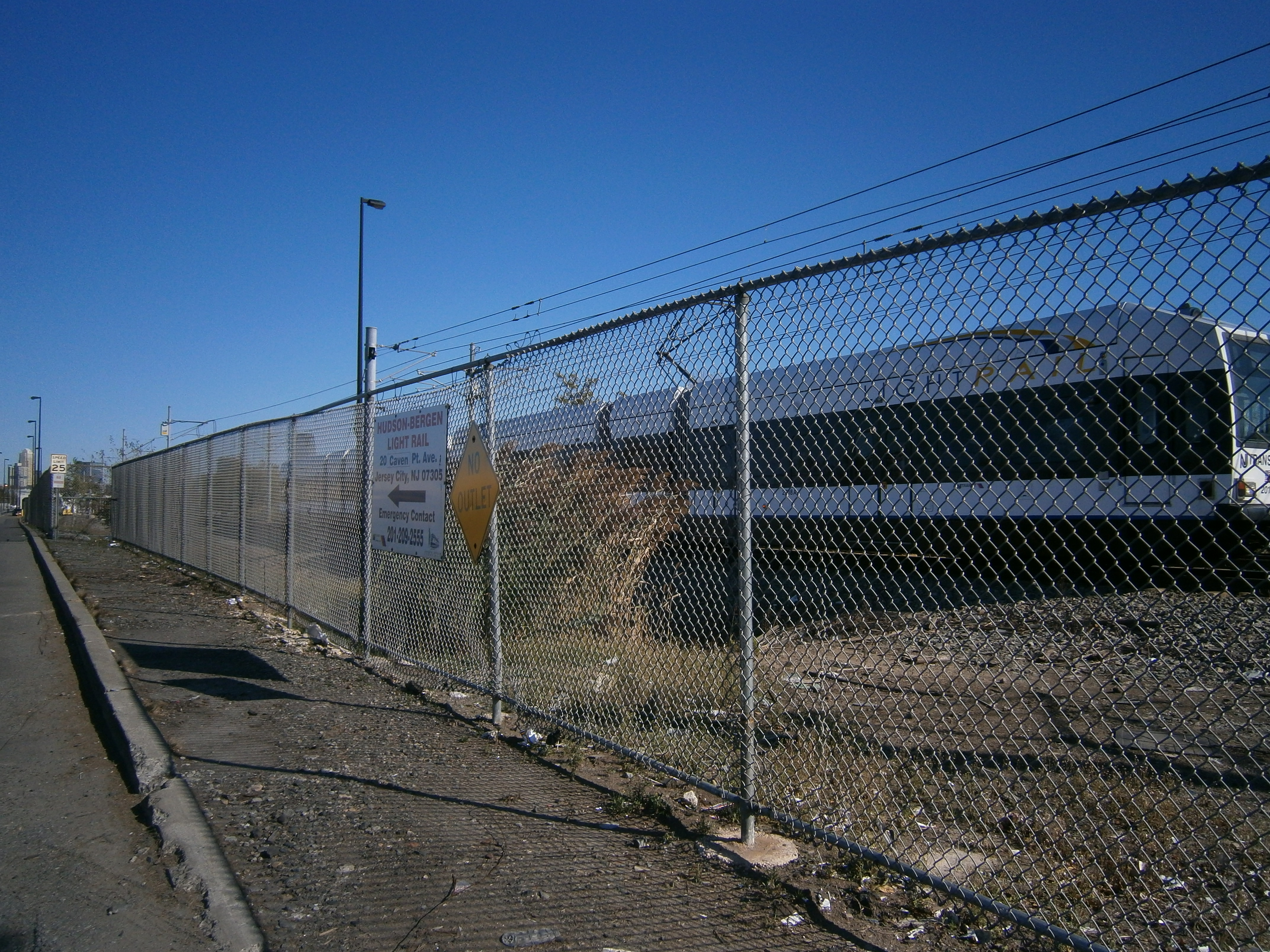
Site of proposed Caven Point Avenue station on the Hudson-Bergen Light Rail

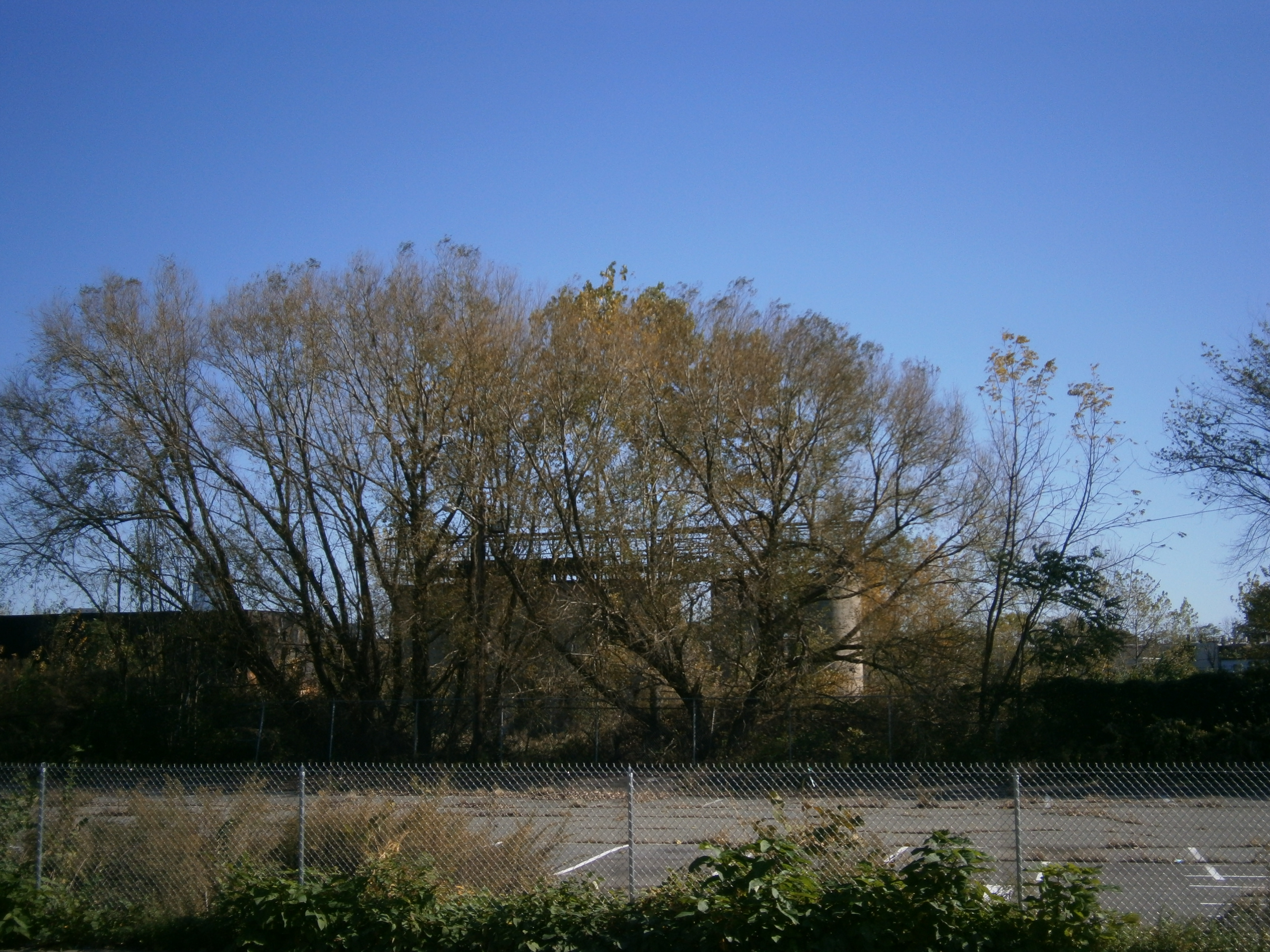
Site of Berry Lane Park north of West Side Branch

Canal Crossing is a New Urbanism project on the eastern side of Jersey City, New Jersey between Jackson Hill in Greenville/Bergen-Lafayette and Liberty State Park. The approximately 111-acre (45 ha) area, previously designated for industrial and distribution uses has been re-zoned for transit-oriented residential and commercial use and the construction of a neighborhood characterized as a sustainable community. The name is inspired by the Morris Canal, which once traversed the district in a general north and south alignment. The brownfield site must first undergo remediation of toxic waste, much of it left by PPG Industries The redevelopment plans call for 7,000 housing units, mainly "mid-rise" buildings (with heights limited to five stories), and a greenway along the former canal, directly south of the 17-acre (6.9 ha) Berry Lane Park.

Two branches of the Hudson-Bergen Light Rail (HBLR) system create the northern and eastern borders of Canal Crossing. A new station at Caven Point Avenue is proposed on the line between Bayonne and Hoboken Terminal along its eastern perimeter between current stations at Richard Street and Liberty State Park. The triangular shape area is bounded by Garfield Avenue on the west, and is accessible from the Newark Bay Extension of the New Jersey Turnpike at its southern tip.

In October 2010, the city received notification of a $2.3 million TIGER grant for continued work on the project. The funding was jeopardized by potential cuts being made in the House of Representatives, but was later allocated. A synopsis of the grant stated:

Planning and design efforts will address modifications to infrastructure, subdivision of properties, zoning changes, and connections to the light rail stop and bike paths at Canal Crossing, a 111-acre redevelopment site in Jersey City surrounded by predominately minority households with high unemployment and poverty rates. Revitalization of this area has been hampered by outdated infrastructure, large tracts of contaminated former industrial lands, and a road system that fails to sufficiently link up with the local regional rail network. The project focus will be to create a residential, mixed-use, transit-oriented development with access to open space amenities in a community with a significant low-income population. The process will also develop a formal legal framework to ensure that redevelopment is equitable.

PPG sued the United States for cleanup costs, arguing that the government's wartime control over the plant during both world wars exposed it to partial liability for the cleanup. The district court held in 2018 that the government's general wartime control of the plant was insufficient to create liability in the absence of a direct connection between the government and waste disposal activities.

PPG has sued the Jersey City Redevelopment Authority stating that its redevelopment plans are hindered by those of the agency.

In September 2019 it was announced that the Critierian Group would convert a warehouse in the district to the state's largest film studio. The soundstage is called Caven Point Studio.

In February 2023, Jersey City approved a charter education campus, with the schools being the BelovED Community Charter School and the Empowerment Academy Charter School, which will create an entire new public school district with over 2,000 students. The campus will include an elementary school for 720 students, a middle school for 360 students, and two high schools for 960 students total. The high schools will feature state-of-the-art facilities for subjects like robotics and 3D printing. The campus is supposed to have a park-like atmosphere and pedestrian-friendly. The schools will be open to students from the entire city, with free bus transportation to every neighborhood. The development will include a segment of the Morris Canal Greenway.

Boraie Development has proposed a residential district with 7 building 5 story buildings in large section of the district just south of Berry Lane Park.

== See also ==
- Bayfront, Jersey City
- PJP Landfill
- List of Superfund sites in New Jersey
