= Statue of Martin Luther King Jr. (Milwaukee) =

Artwork by Erik Blome in Wisconsin, US

Dr. Martin Luther King Jr.
- Artist: Erik Blome
- Year: 1998
- Type: bronze
- Dimensions: 290 cm (114 in)
- Location: Milwaukee, Wisconsin; 43.053359°N 87.914109°W
- Owner: YWCA of Greater Milwaukee

Dr. Martin Luther King Jr. is a 1998 public art work designed by American artist Erik Blome, located in downtown Milwaukee, Wisconsin. The bronze sculpture depicts the civil rights movement leader Martin Luther King Jr. standing on a pedestal of books. It was commissioned by the YWCA of Greater Milwaukee and is located in front of the King Heights apartments.

== See also ==
- Children of the West End
- Civil rights movement in popular culture
- Martin Luther King Jr. (Wilson sculpture), Washington, D.C.
- Statue of Martin Luther King Jr. (Austin, Texas)
- Statue of Martin Luther King Jr. (Houston)
