= Statue of Martin Luther King Jr. (Houston) =

Sculpture in Houston, Texas, U.S.

- Artist: Ed Dwight
- Year: 2007
- Type: Sculpture
- Medium: Bronze
- Subject: Martin Luther King Jr.
- Location: Houston, Texas, United States; 29.721324°N 95.388325°W

An outdoor 2007 bronze sculpture of Martin Luther King Jr. by American artist Ed Dwight is installed in Hermann Park's McGovern Centennial Gardens in Houston, Texas, United States. The sculpture was vandalized with white paint in August 2017. John D. Harden, Margaret Kadifa, Mike Morris, and Brooke A. Lewis of the Houston Chronicle noted that the vandalism occurred around the same time that protesters demanded the removal of Confederate monuments and memorials in Houston, and the same day that the city's statue of Christopher Columbus was vandalized with red paint.

== See also ==
- 2007 in art
- Civil rights movement in popular culture
- Dr. Martin Luther King Jr. (Blome sculpture), Milwaukee, Wisconsin
- Martin Luther King Jr. (Wilson sculpture), Washington, D.C.
- List of public art in Houston
- Statue of Martin Luther King Jr. (Austin, Texas)
