= Statue of Martin Luther King Jr. (Austin, Texas) =

Statue of Martin Luther King Jr. in Austin, Texas, U.S.

- The statue in 2018
- Artist: Jeffrey Varilla; Anna Koh-Varilla
- Year: 1999
- Medium: Bronze sculpture
- Subject: Martin Luther King Jr.
- Location: Austin, Texas, United States; 30°17′7.7″N 97°44′10.3″W

Martin Luther King Jr. is an outdoor bronze sculpture depicting the American civil rights leader of the same name by Jeffrey Varilla and Anna Koh-Varilla, installed on the University of Texas at Austin campus, in Austin, Texas. The statue was installed in September 1999. Efforts to erect a monument were initiated by a group of students, who formed the Martin Luther King Jr. Sculpture Foundation in 1987.

== See also ==
- 1999 in art
- Civil rights movement in popular culture
- Dr. Martin Luther King Jr. (Blome sculpture), Milwaukee, Wisconsin
- Martin Luther King Jr. (Wilson sculpture), Washington, D.C.
- Statue of Martin Luther King Jr. (Houston)
