= Children of the West End =

Public artwork in Milwaukee, Wisconsin

- Artist: Erik Blome
- Year: 2000
- Dimensions: 550 cm (216 in)
- Location: 36th St. and Wisconsin Ave.; Milwaukee, Wisconsin; 43.038913°N 87.959362°W
- Owner: City of Milwaukee

Children of the West End is a public artwork by artist Erik Blome. It is located on N. 36th St. and W. Wisconsin Ave., west of downtown Milwaukee, Wisconsin. The work was commissioned by the West End Development Corporation as part of the Spirit of Milwaukee's Neighborhood Millennium Art Initiative. The artwork depicts four children cast in bronze. The figures, two male and two female, balance along the top edge of a winding brick wall surrounded by a garden.

According to Blome, "The models for the sculptures of the children were recruited from the surrounding neighborhood." The work includes a bronze relief that spans one face of the wall. The relief design incorporates significant architecture of Milwaukee's west side, including the Pabst Mansion.

== See also ==
- Dr. Martin Luther King, Jr.
