= Martin Luther King, Jr. Memorial (Jersey City) =

American sculpture and memorial in New Jersey

Coordinates: 40.7121°N 74.0773°W

Martin Luther King Jr. Memorial
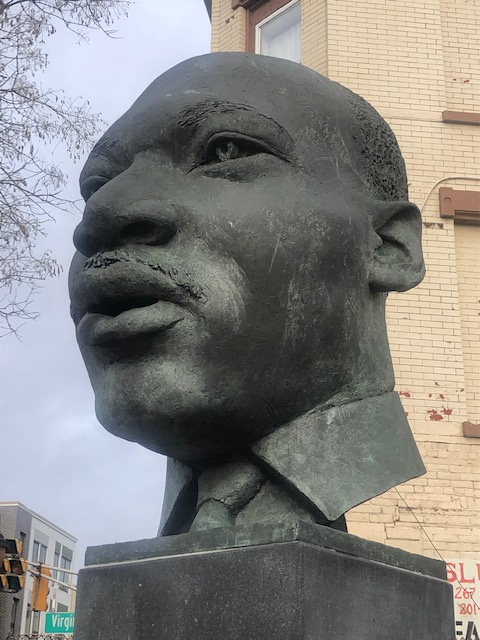
- Year: 2000
- Type: Bronze, Granite
- Location: Jersey City, New Jersey

The Martin Luther King Jr. Memorial is a memorial to Martin Luther King Jr. at the Martin Luther King Drive station of the Hudson–Bergen Light Rail in the Jackson Hill section of Jersey City, New Jersey.

The work — a bust and accompanying bas reliefs — was created by the sculptor Jonathan Shahn (1938-2020), who was son of Ben Shahn. It was commissioned by NJ Transit and unveiled in 2000 upon the station's opening.

The bronze 4 feet (1.2 m) bust is set atop a 7 feet (2.1 m) granite pedestal. Accompanying bronze bas reliefs, in 2-foot sections, entitled The Struggle for Civil Rights in the Martin Luther King Era, show scenes and figures from the civil rights movement. The reverse side is inscribed with a quotation from King's Letter from Birmingham Jail: "We know through painful experience that freedom is never voluntarily given by the oppressor; it must be demanded by the oppressed."

King is known to have made at least two speeches in Jersey City. On September 21, 1965, he received an honorary Doctor of Law from St. Peter's College. Dr. King gave an address titled "The American Dream." On Wednesday, March 27, 1968, barely a week before his death, nearly 2,000 heard King at Metropolitan A.M.E. Zion Church in which her rallied support the Poor People's Campaign and the Memphis sanitation strike. The Afro-American Historical and Cultural Society Museum in Jersey City documents those visits.

== See also ==
- List of public art in Jersey City, New Jersey
- Bust of Martin Luther King Jr. (Alston)
- Bust of Martin Luther King Jr. (U.S. Capitol)
- Memorials to Martin Luther King Jr.
- List of streets named after Martin Luther King Jr.
- Civil rights movement in popular culture
