= Jackson Hill, Jersey City =

Populated place in Hudson County, New Jersey, US

Coordinates: 40.7121°N 74.0773°W

Jackson Hill is a neighborhood in the Bergen-Lafayette and Greenville sections of Jersey City, New Jersey. It is part of the city's Ward F. The neighborhood is situated on Bergen Hill (the lower end of the Hudson Palisades) which also lends its name to the Bergen Hill Historic District just north of Communipaw Avenue.

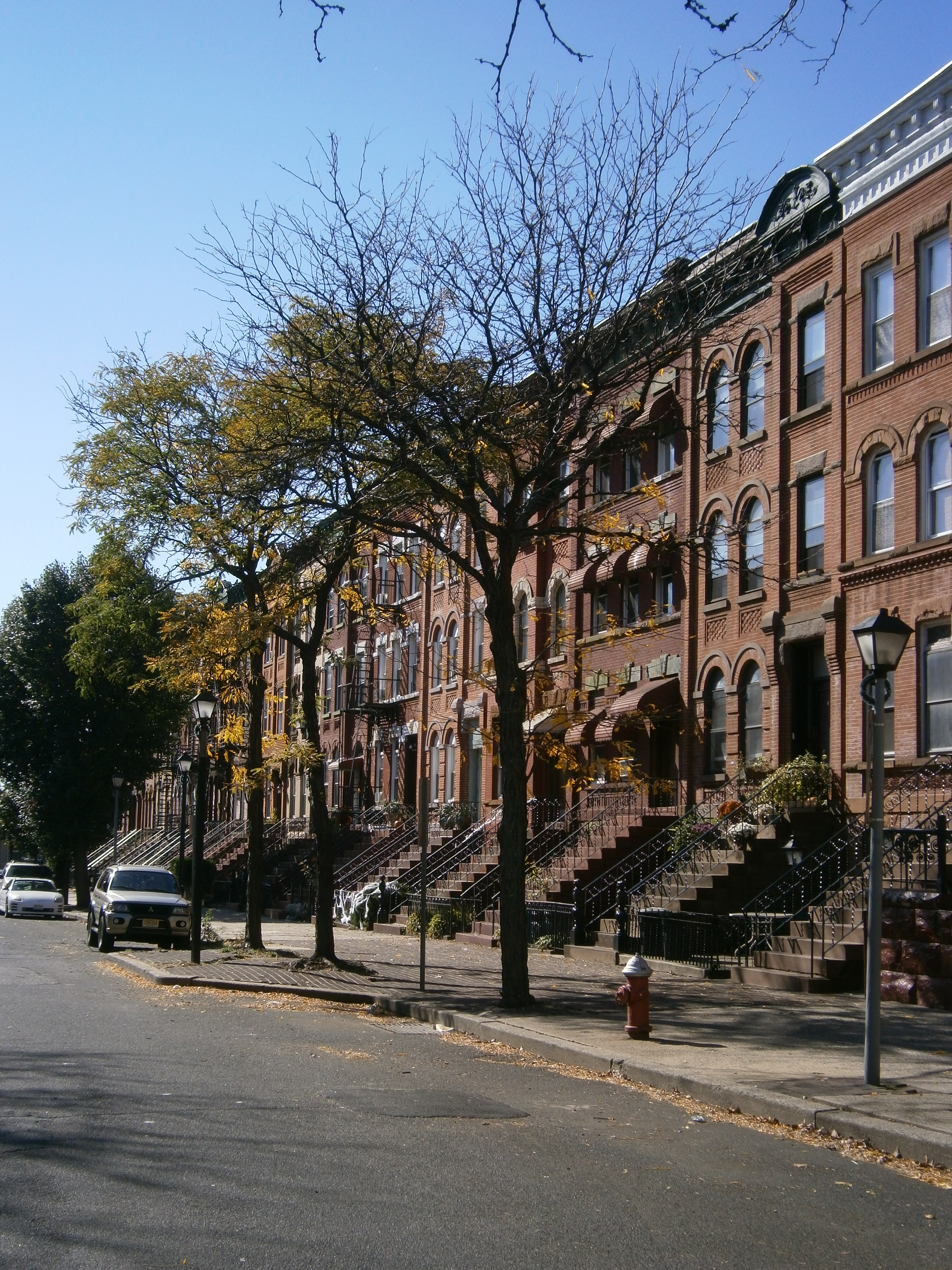
Madison Avenue in Jackson Hill

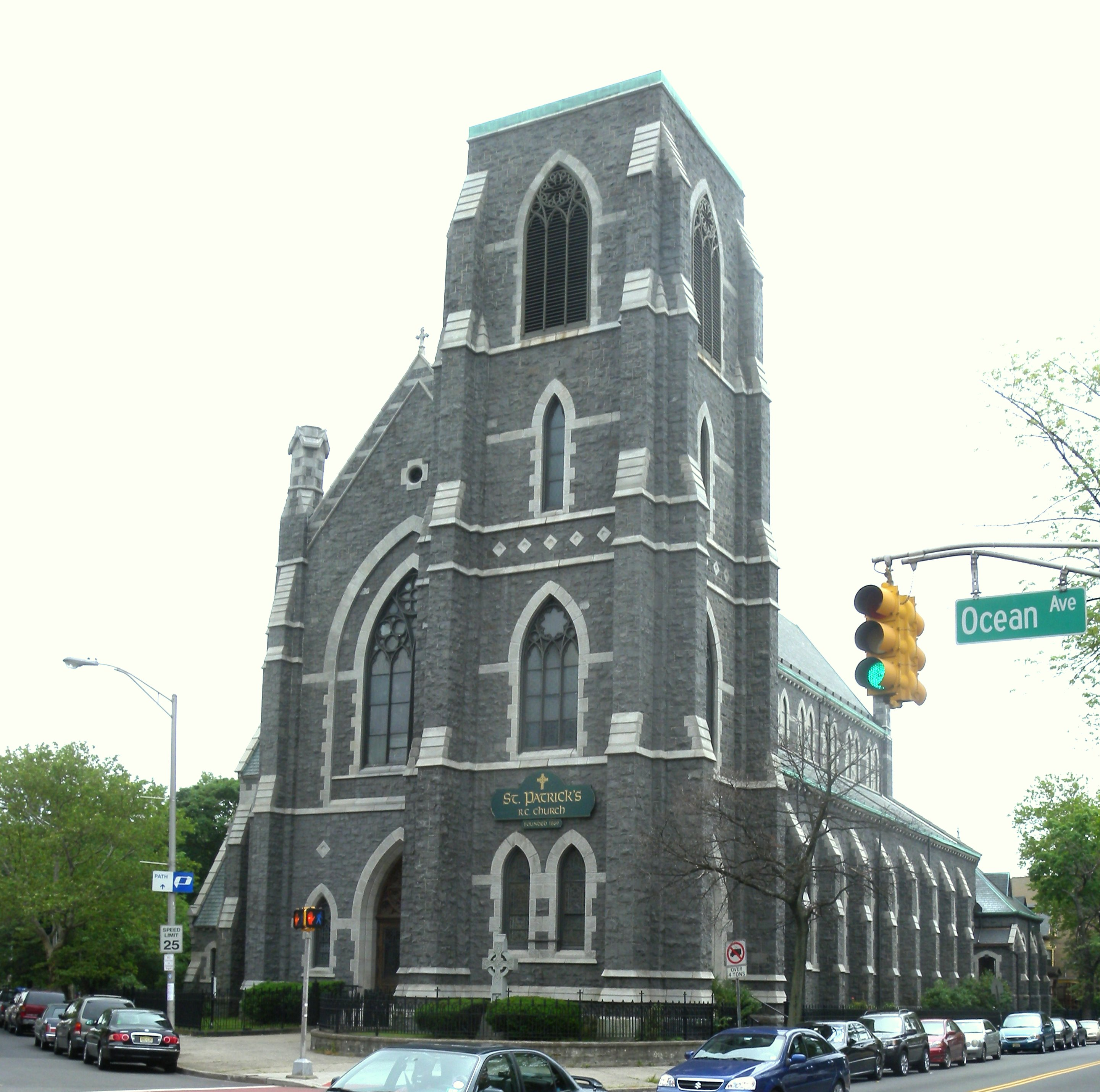
St Patrick's at Grand St

The district, once home to Jersey City's substantial Irish and Italian immigrant communities, became the heart of the African American community in early 1970's. Today it is home to a diverse mix of young families, urban professionals, artists, entrepreneurs, LGBTQ+ residents, and working-class households. Its name is in part inspired by Thomas and John Vreeland Jackson, brothers born in 1800 and 1803, who were freed slaves who bought land in current day Greenville in 1831 and in 1857 laid out Jackson Lane between their houses. In 1900, the former Jackson Lane became Winfield Avenue, the name it bears today. During the Civil War the Jackson property became a safe house and critical link of the Underground Railroad.

Martin Luther King Drive was once called Jackson Avenue. with a short block not included in a street realignment still bearing the name. In 1976 it was renamed in honor of the slain civil right leader Martin Luther King, Jr., who had twice spoken in the city. At the time of the renaming there was discussion whether the street had originally been named for the Jackson brothers or for US President Andrew Jackson. A 1924 Jersey Journal newspaper article ascribes it to Jeremiah Jackson, a local landowner in the mid-19th century. Historically, Jackson Avenue was one of the city's major vibrant shopping districts, but it declined after the Lafayette Gardens public housing riots, which were sparked by the arrest of Dolores Shannon for disorderly conduct and public intoxication and the confrontations that followed between residents and police. In 2011, the Jersey City Redevelopment Agency created Jackson Hill Main Street special improvement district along the commercial corridors of MLK Drive and its northern continuation, Monticello Avenue. A renewed campaign to revert the name of the street back to Jackson Avenue has started gaining popularity amongst residents, beginning with the renaming of the HBLR Martin Luther King Station the Thomas and John Jackson Station.

Among the notable sites in the Jackson Hill are two listed on National Register of Historic Places, St. Patrick's Parish and Buildings and Ficken's Warehouse, both on Grand Street. Sacred Heart Church, Audubon Park and the Martin Luther King, Jr. Memorial are other area landmarks.

== Claremont ==
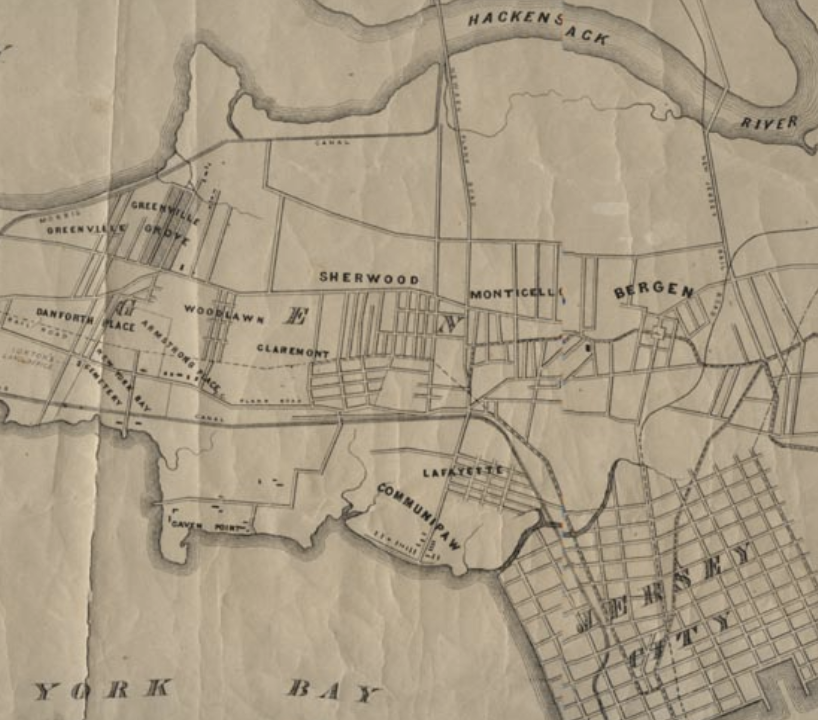
The Claremont section (center) was laid out as early as 1860 and roughly corresponds with Jackson Hill.

The name Claremont appears in mid-19th century maps of Greenville Township, neighboring Bergen City, and Jersey City, which were consolidated by 1872. The area was laid out on Bergen Hill west of Bergen Point Plank Road, now Garfield Avenue. Today's Claremont Avenue created the border of what has become known as the Greenville and Bergen-Lafayette sections of the city. The Central Railroad of New Jersey maintained a station by the name south of the junction of its main and Newark branch line until service was discontinued in 1967. Claremont Bank, which later become part of the Trust Company of New Jersey, began in the area. The Claremont Branch of the Jersey City Free Public Library opened in 1954, and was replaced the Cunningham Branch in 2004. Claremont Terminal east of the neighbourhood is a maritime facility created from tidal flats in the Upper New York Bay opened in 1923.

== Jackson Square ==
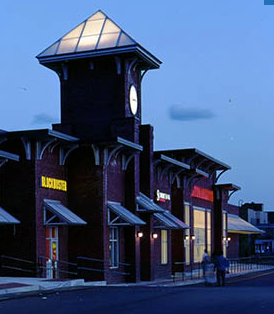
Originally the Hub, now Jackson Square

Jackson Square, originally known as the Hub, is a shopping center just south of Martin Luther King Drive station of the Hudson Bergen Light Rail which has been the traditional border between Bergen-Lafayette and Greenville. After allegations of unethical and imprudent self-dealing managing the property forced the resignation of then JCRA director Bob Antonicello, it has since been renamed Jackson Square. It is the site of the Martin Luther King, Jr. Memorial.

Over the years MLK Drive and some adjacent residential side streets deteriorated. Since 1975 the Municipal Council of Jersey City has adopted a number of resolutions and ordinances aimed at revitalizing sections of avenue. They include Jackson Avenue Renewal Plan (1975), original MLK Plan (1979), the Turnkey Redevelopment Plan (1980), and the Green Villa Plan (1983). The current MLK Redevelopment Plan was first adopted in 1993.

MLK Drive is runs for 26 blocks south of Communipaw Avenue and the Hub has been the center piece of revitalisation efforts. Open in 2000, it is one of city's most ambitious economic revitalization projects. Primarily funded by the Jersey City Economic Development Corporation, a significant investment of public capital has been the catalyst for private investment in the area. The success of the project is questionable since rentals have been erratic.

Other projects along the MLK corridor have included the Cunningham Branch of the Jersey City Free Public Library, named for former African-American Mayor of Jersey City, Glenn Dale Cunningham, and Jackson Greene, a new urbanism townhouse complex. In 2014, a new postal facility at the Hub was designated in honour of Shirley Tolentino.

The Hudson County Urban League is the 100th affiliate of the National Urban League operating from two locations in Hudson County, New Jersey. The building at 236 Martin Luther King Drive in Jackson Hill neighbourhood of Jersey City was listed on New Jersey Register of Historic Places designation (ID#2863) as the First Fidelity Bank on September 19, 1995. The headquarters, renovated in 2002, also houses the Jersey City office of Donald Milford Payne, Jr., the U.S. representative for New Jersey's 10th congressional district since 2012. Nearby is Fishers Confections, opened in 1919, a city landmark.

=== City Hall Annex and Public Safety Building ===
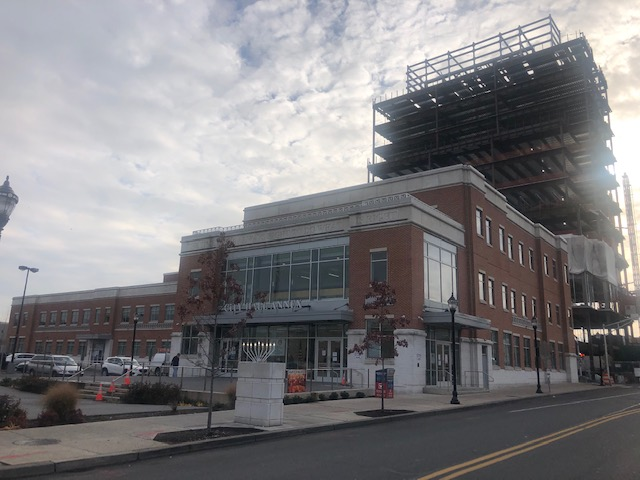
City Hall Annex and Public Safety Building (2021)

In 2009, the city's divisions of Community Development, Tenant/Landlord Relations and Housing Code Enforcement moved satellite offices of the Department of Housing, Economic Development and Commerce at the Hub.

In 2013 Jersey City established a ‘banking development district’, at the Hub which creates incentives for banks to establish full service branches within it, including the opening of accounts with municipal funds.

The Jersey City Employment & Training Program (JCETP), headed by former governor Jim McGreevey opened a new center called Matin's Place in September 2014. Among those at the opening of the facility were Brendan Byrne, Thomas Kean, Steve Fulop, Chris Christie, Robert Menendez and Nancy Pelosi.

In August 2014, the city initially approved a plan to enter an agreement with the Brandywine Corporation, which owns and manages the Hub, to build an annex to Jersey City City Hall. A plan was approved in March 2015. The city hall annex opened in April 2018.

The Department of Public Safety, which oversees the police and fire departments, opened offices at the Hub in Fall 2014. The city in agreed with Brandywine to build an eleven-story public safety building consolidating many services. Ground was broken in 2020.

In 2016, zoning was changed to encourage a "restaurant row" to emulate the restaurant district around Communipaw Junction where revitalization efforts have stalled.

== Transportation ==
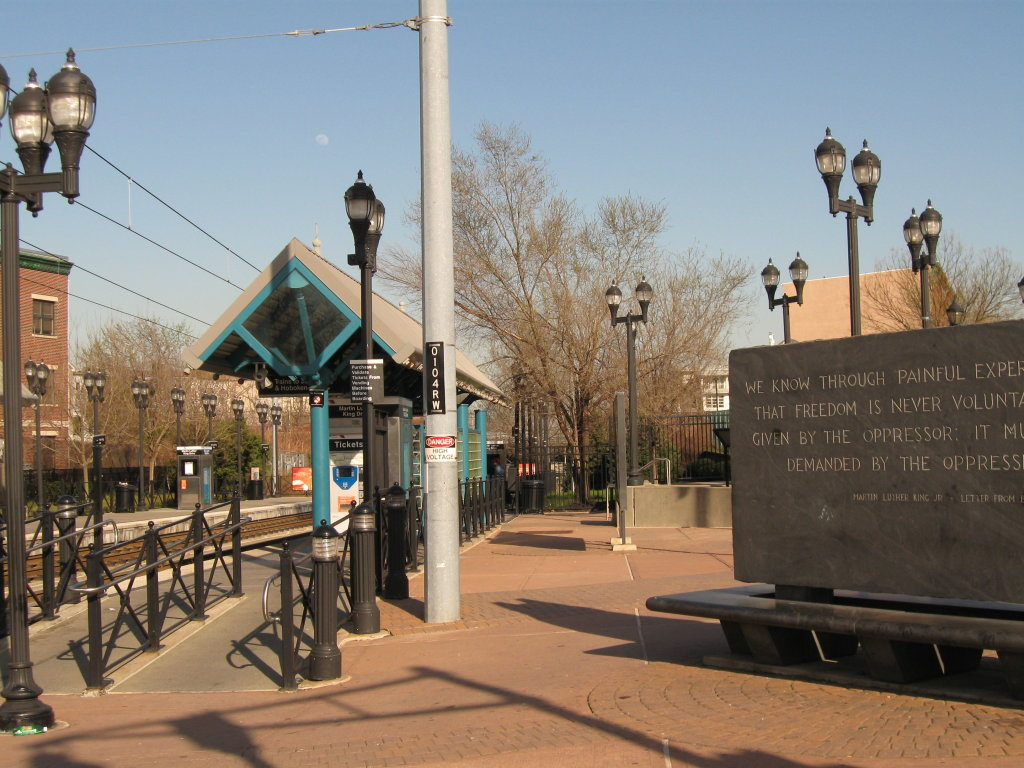
MLK Drive HBLR station

In addition to the Hudson Bergen Light Rail station at Martin Luther King Drive the Garfield Avenue station is nearby. The line runs along the right-of-way that was originally part of the Newark and New York Branch and had a station on Jackson Avenue until 1946, when service was discontinued. Until 1947 Public Service Railway's # 7 Jackson streetcar line ran along it. In 2005 the New Jersey Legislature designated the stop the "Thomas and John Jackson Station."

A sculpture honoring the legacy of Martin Luther King Jr. is located at the station. A plaque installed by New Jersey Transit (NJT) in 2001, honors the Jackson's role in the 19th-century Underground Railroad.

Bus service is provided by New Jersey Transit bus routes 6, 81, and 87. through Greenville to Merritt Street, with the NJT81 continuing to Bayonne. Northbound, the 6 and 87 travel to Journal Square, with the 87 continuing through Jersey City Heights to Hudson Place (Hoboken). The 81 travels through Downtown Jersey City to Exchange Place. Service is also provided on Ocean and Bergen Avenues by route 8.

== See also ==
- Canal Crossing, Jersey City
- Berry Lane Park
- Sacred Heart Church (Jersey City)
