= Sacred Heart Church (Jersey City, New Jersey) =

Former Catholic church building in New Jersey

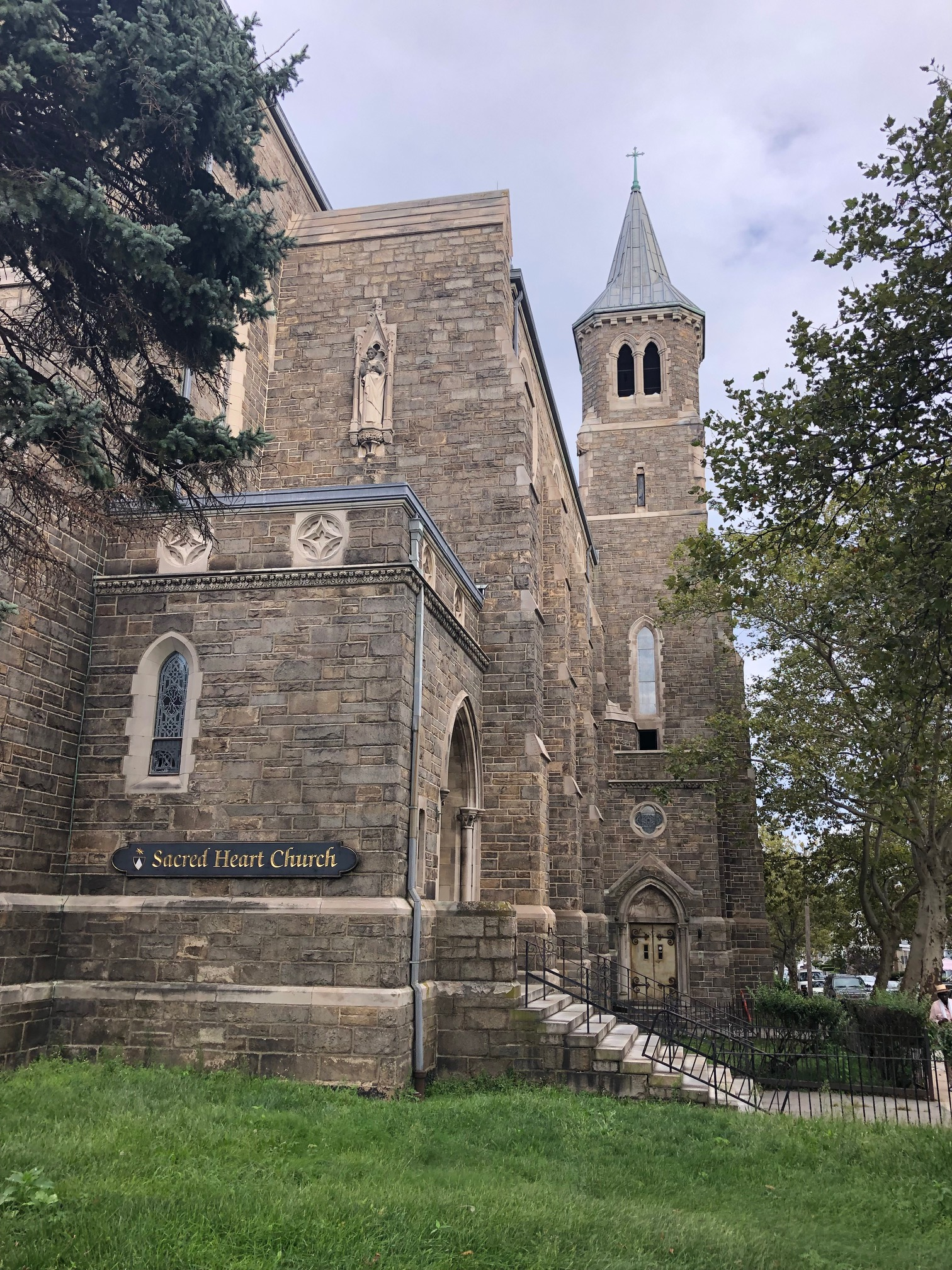
- The former church building in 2019
- Sacred Heart Church
- 40°42′24″N 74°05′00″W
- Address: Jersey City, New Jersey
- Country: United States
- Denomination: Roman Catholic (former)

History
- Status: Church (1898–2005)
- Founded: 1898
- Dedicated: 1898

Architecture
- Functional status: Closed (in 2005)
- Architect: Ralph Adams Cram
- Architectural type: Gothic Revival
- Years built: 1922

Administration
- Archdiocese: Archdiocese of Newark

The Sacred Heart Church is a historic church and former Roman Catholic parish church on MLK Drive at Bayview Avenue in the historic Greenville section of Jersey City, New Jersey, United States. It is within the Archdiocese of Newark.

Established in 1898 as a parish, the church was built in 1922; and closed for worship in 2005.

== History and description ==
=== Use as a church ===
Built between 1922 and 1924, it was designed by Boston architect Ralph Adams Cram with a mixture of Spanish Gothic and Moorish architecture. Its stained glass windows were designed by the then 18-year-old Harry Wright Goodhue.

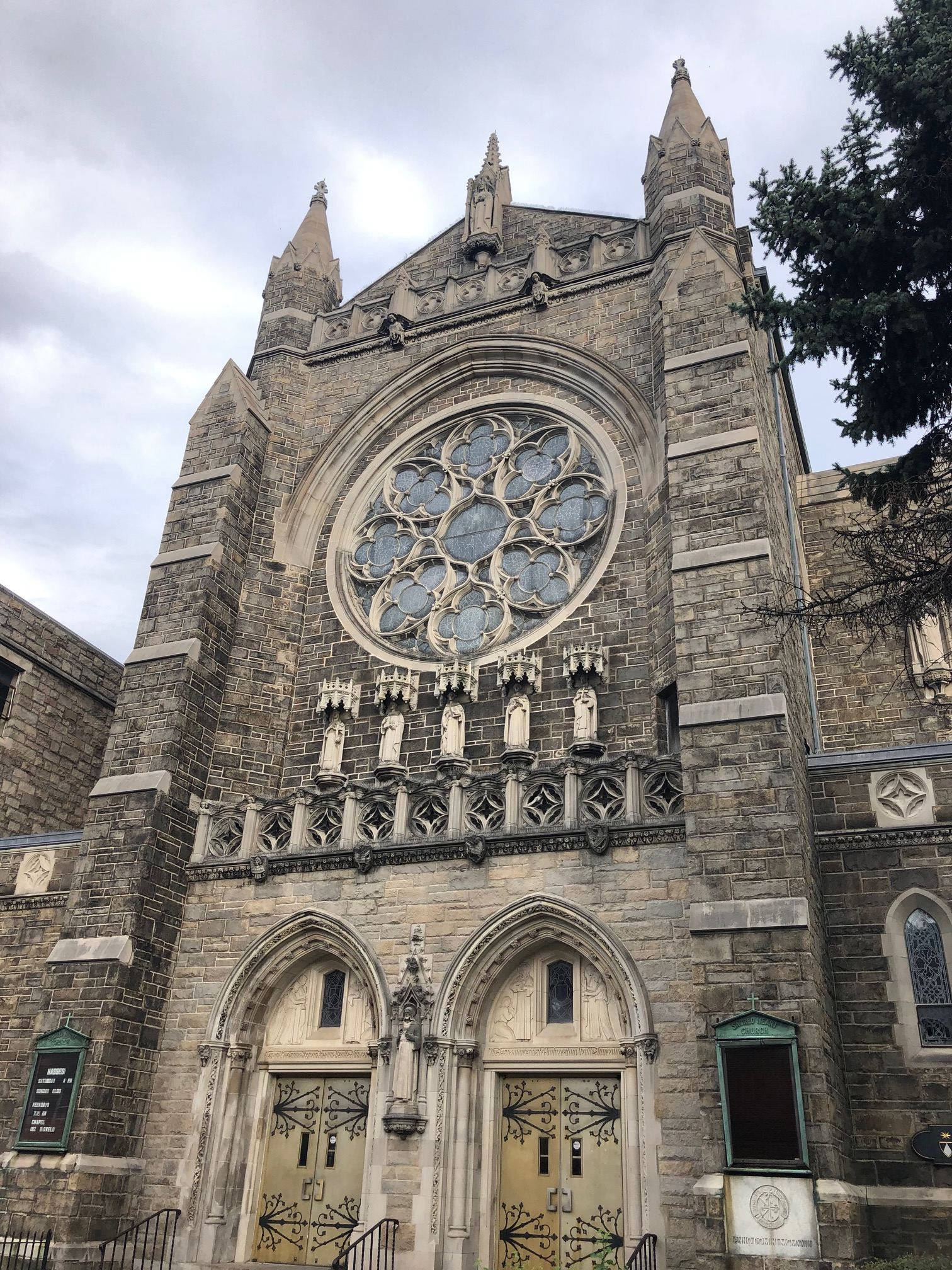

The complex is not listed on the National Register of Historic Places and is not considered threatened.

The Sacred Heart Church closed in 2005 when the number of parishioners dropped to a few hundred from the 4,000 it had at its peak. The Archdiocese of Newark has no plans to reopen the church. The affiliated Sacred Heart School closed in August of 2025.

=== Subsequent use ===
The priory of the church was slated to become home of the Jersey City Employment & Training Program (JCETP) re-entry program, headed by Jim McGreevey, in 2015. Plans to house former violent offenders were met with fierce opposition from neighboring residents leading the Archdiocese of Newark to cancel the sale.

During the 2019 Jersey City shooting the school was on lock-down and used as defensive position during the incident. That school was taken over by law-enforcement agencies and used during the incident.

In March 2026 plans to turn the formerly vacant Priory into 14 unit apartment units were unanimously approved by the Jersey City Planning Board; historic architectural details will be preserved though not required per the Jackson Hill Redevelopment Plan.

Social media reports in April 2026 suggested that interior portions of Sacred Heart of Jesus Church and the Priory had been selected as filming locations for an upcoming untitled Exorcist franchise film directed by Mike Flanagan and scheduled for release in late 2027. As of June 2026, neither the film's producers, the Archdiocese of Newark, nor the property's redeveloper have publicly confirmed the reports.

== See also ==
- Jackson Hill, Jersey City
- Bayview – New York Bay Cemetery
- Sacred Heart RC Church Campus, Jersey City
