= Homage to King =

1996 sculpture by Xavier Medina Campeny

- Artist: Xavier Medina Campeny
- Year: 1996
- Subject: Martin Luther King Jr.
- Location: Atlanta, Georgia
- 33.759930°N 84.372468°W
- Website: Homage to King, Freedom Park Conservancy

Homage to King is a 1996 sculpture by Barcelona artist Xavier Medina Campeny, commissioned as a gift from the Spanish host city of the 1992 Summer Olympics to the host of the 1996 Summer Olympics. It is located at the southwest corner of Freedom Parkway and Boulevard in Atlanta, Georgia, in the Old Fourth Ward neighborhood. The work portrays Martin Luther King Jr. with outstretched arm, representing a welcome to those visiting the Martin Luther King Jr. National Historical Park. The location is also one of an oft-used view of the Downtown Atlanta skyline.

== See also ==
- Civil rights movement in popular culture
- Memorials to Martin Luther King Jr.
