= Harry Wright Goodhue =

Harry Wright Goodhue (1905–1931) was a stained glass artist whose work is featured in churches throughout the United States. During his short career he designed windows for over thirty churches.

== Background and family ==
Goodhue was born in Cambridge, Massachusetts and the eldest son of Boston stained glass artist Harry Eldredge Goodhue and Mary Louise Wright Goodhue. Wright received his early training in his father's Boston studio and in children's art classes at the Boston Museum of Fine Art. In 1921, Wright left school to work as an office boy and later as a draftsman in the architectural firm of Allen & Collens, where he designed his first stained glass windows including a chancel window for a church designed by his uncle Bertram G. Goodhue. Wright later studied for two years at Harvard University, where he wrote a thesis on aesthetics. In 1930 he married writer Cornelia Evans and they lived in Greenwich Village. He died in 1931 at the early age of 26.

== Works ==
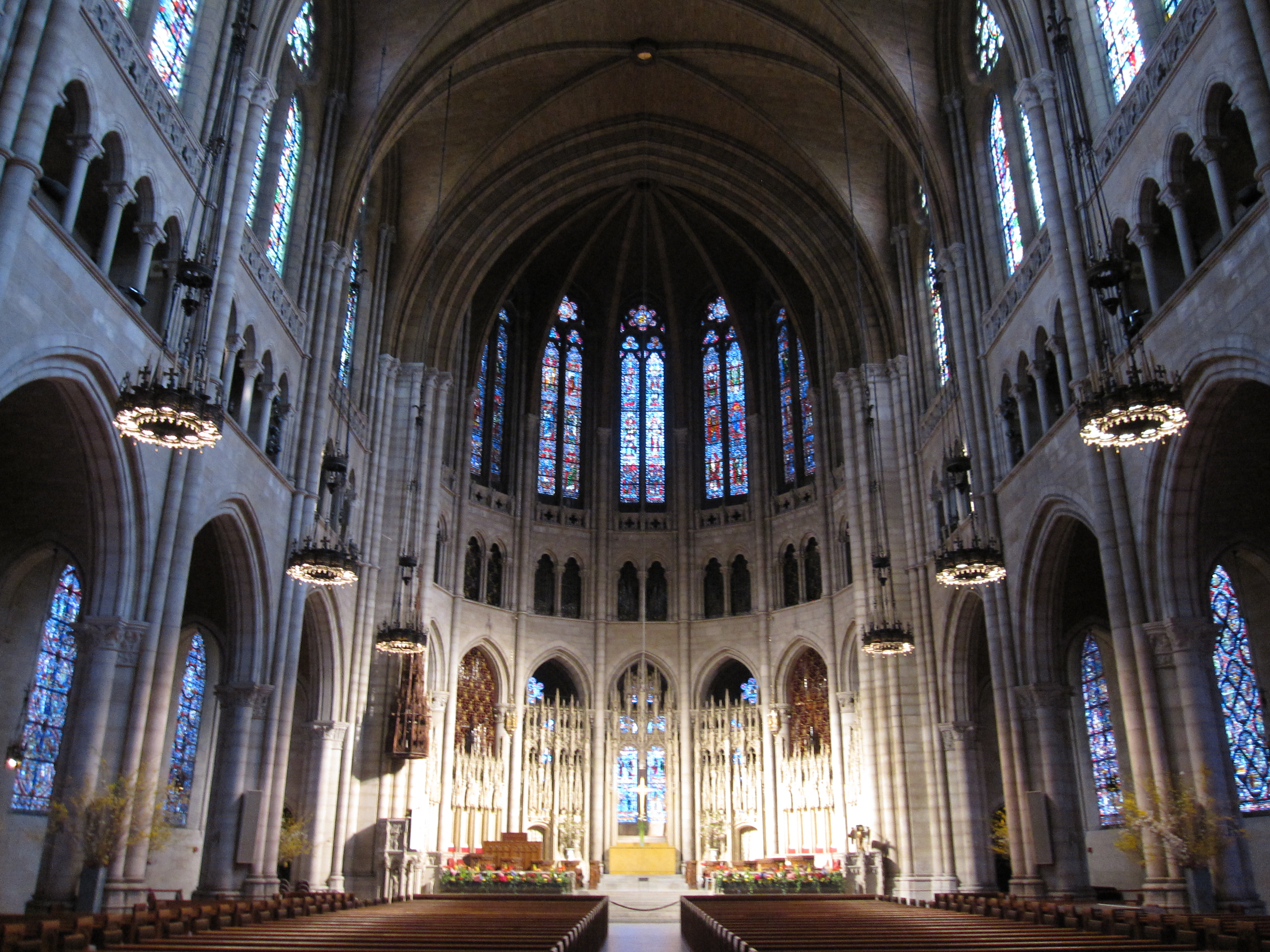
The apse at Riverside Church

In 1924, he and his mother (who is credited with a window at the First Parish Church, Brookline) opened their own Boston studio. His commissions included windows for churches by well-known architects such as Ralph Adams Cram, Bertram G. Goodhue, Allen & Collens, and William P. Hutchins. Some of Wright's window designs were shown at the Tricentennial Exhibition of the Boston Society of Arts and Crafts in 1927.

- Second Universalist Church (Boston)
- Christ Church Cranbrook, (Bloomfield Hills, Michigan)
- Sacred Heart Church (Jersey City) (transept and rose windows), 1923
- Saint James Church (Wilkinsburg, Pennsylvania)
- Congregational Church (Montclair, New Jersey). 1920
- Trinity English Lutheran Church (Fort Wayne, Indiana)
- Emmanuel Episcopal Church (La Grange, Illinois) (Life of Christ window)
- Riverside Church (New York) (apse)
- All Souls Memorial Episcopal Church (Washington, DC) 1929 (resurrection window)
- Pine Street Presbyterian Church (Harrisburg, Pennsylvania)
- Holy Rosary R. C. Church, (Homewood, Pennsylvania) (façade rose) 1928-30
- Calvary Episcopal Church, (East Liberty, Pittsburgh, Pennsylvania) (Great Commission)
- St. Paul's Episcopal Church (Winston-Salem, NC), 1928. (east window at high altar)
