= PJP Landfill =

Coordinates: 40.7313°N 74.0876°W

The United States Environmental Protection Agency added the PJP Landfill site in Marion Section of Jersey City, New Jersey to the Superfund National Priorities List on September 1, 1983, because hazardous chemicals were found in the soil and groundwater. The 87-acre site located in Hudson County contained a landfill that may have been used as early as 1968 to dispose of chemical and industrial wastes. In 1971 the State certified the landfill to receive solid wastes. Approximately 11,900 people currently reside within a one-mile radius of the site. The west side of the site is bordered by the Hackensack River which is used for boating and commercial shipping. Recently, AMB Corporation purchased a portion of the site.

The initial response action began in 1985 when the New Jersey Department of Environmental Protection extinguished the landfill fires, capped the landfill, and installed a gas venting system to prevent the buildup of gas within the landfill. The Remedial Action Construction began when the New Jersey Department of Environmental Protection and the EPA approved the Final Design Report. The report was developed to provide the proposed design for a cap cover system. It has four main objectives: to eliminate exposure to contaminated sediments in the Sip Avenue Ditch, prevent additional contaminant influx into the ground water via rainwater, remove contaminant sources that may impact ground water, and the implementation of models to evaluate if future actions are necessary to limit the leaching of contaminants into the Hackensack River.

In 2008, AMB Corporation bought approximately 51.76 acres of the site. This property will be capped and a warehouse will be constructed, while the rest of the property AMB owns will be turned into greenspace. The remaining portion of the site is under the responsibility of Waste Management of New Jersey, Inc. and CWM Chemical Services, LLC (collectively “CCS”). The work they are responsible for includes: a multi-layer, modified solid waste cap, wetlands reconstruction and enhancement efforts, and environmental monitoring.

The Remedial Action Construction began in 2008. It has been redeveloped, and is home to a warehouse and a walkway. Some theorize that Jimmy Hoffa is buried there.

The site was designated as the space for the first North American memorial for victims of the coronavirus pandemic.

== See also ==
- Canal Crossing, Jersey City
