= Bust of Martin Luther King Jr. (U.S. Capitol) =

1986 sculpture by John Woodrow Wilson

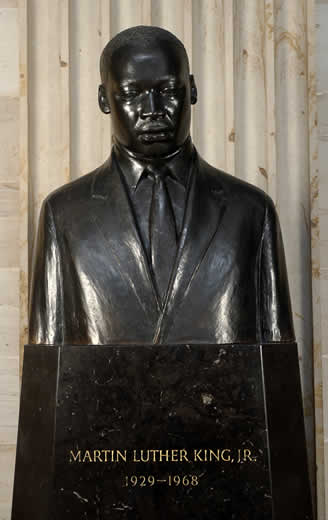
- Bust in 2009
- Artist: John Woodrow Wilson
- Year: 1986
- Type: Patinated bronze
- Location: Washington, D.C., United States; 38.889851°N 77.008905°W
- Owner: Architect of the Capitol

A bust of Martin Luther King Jr. by the American artist John Woodrow Wilson is located at the United States Capitol rotunda in Washington, D.C.

== Description ==
The bust depicts Dr. Martin Luther King Jr. in a contemplative and peaceful mood, looking slightly downward, patinated to match the black marble base.

== History ==
The bust was unveiled in the Rotunda on January 16, 1986, by Dr. King's wife Coretta, their four children, and Dr. King's sister, Christine King Farris.

== See also ==
- List of artworks commemorating African Americans in Washington, D.C.
- Statue of Martin Luther King Jr. (Austin, Texas)
- Memorials to Martin Luther King Jr.
- Bust of Martin Luther King Jr. (Alston)
- Bust of Martin Luther King, Jr. (Jersey City)
- Civil rights movement in popular culture
