= Martin Luther King Drive station =

Light rail station in New Jersey, US

Martin Luther King Drive
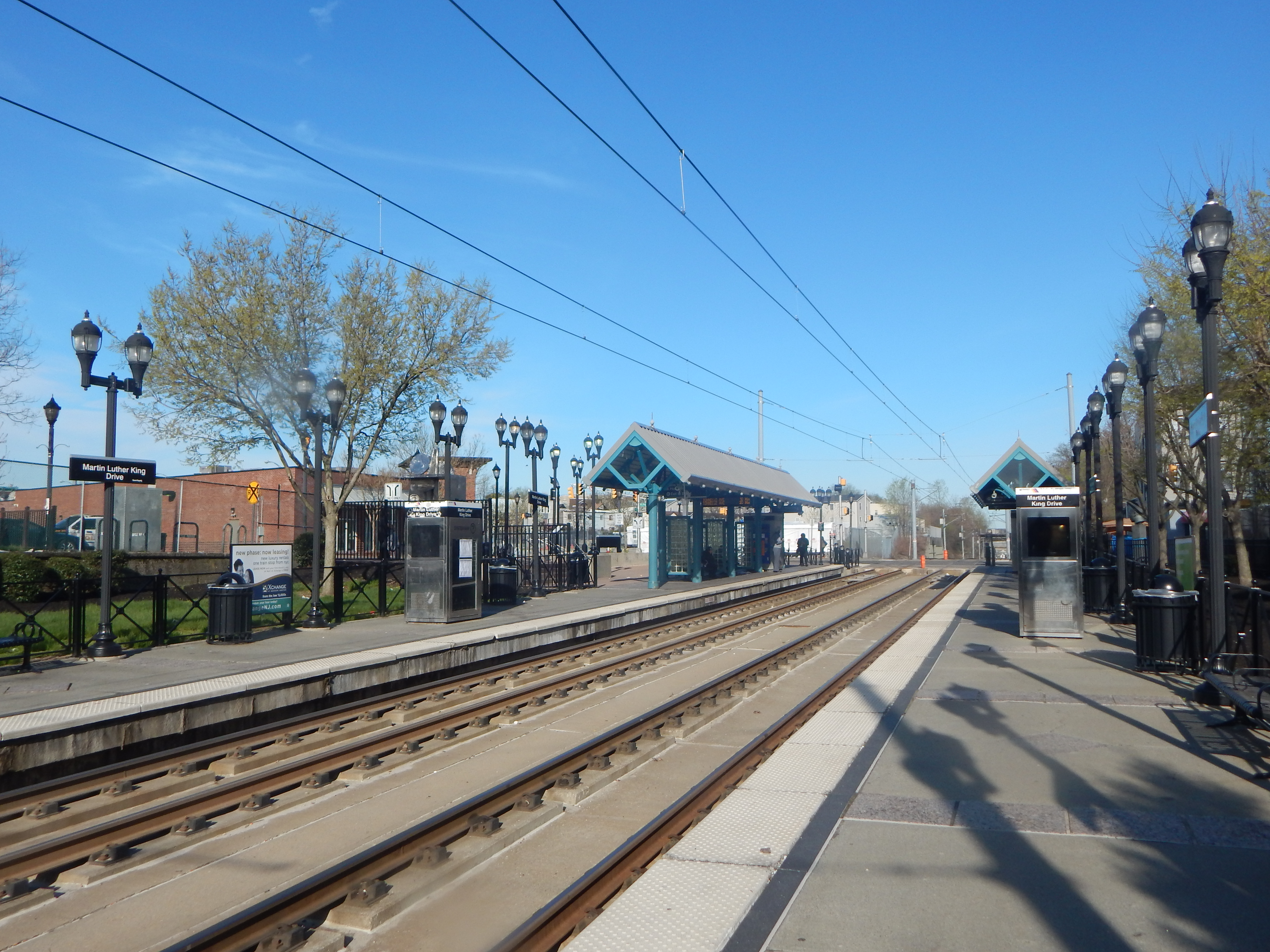
- Martin Luther King Drive station platform in April 2015

General information
- Location: Martin Luther King Drive and Virginia Avenue; Jersey City, New Jersey
- Coordinates: 40°42′44″N 74°04′38″W
- Owner: New Jersey Transit
- Platforms: 2 side platforms
- Tracks: 2
- Connections: NJ Transit Bus: 6, 81, 87

Construction
- Cycle facilities: Yes
- Accessible: Yes

Other information
- Fare zone: 1

History
- Opened: April 15, 2000

Passengers
- 2025: 1,719(average weekday)
- Rank: 11 of 24

Services
Preceding station	NJ Transit	Following station
West Side Avenue Terminus	West Side–Tonnelle	Garfield Avenue toward Tonnelle Avenue
Former services
Preceding station	Central Railroad of New Jersey	Following station
West Side Avenue toward Newark Broad Street	Newark and New York Branch Jackson Avenue	Arlington Avenue toward Jersey City
Location

Martin Luther King Drive station is a station of the Hudson–Bergen Light Rail in the Jackson Hill neighborhood of Jersey City, Hudson County, New Jersey. Located on the east side of Martin Luther King Drive (Hudson County Route 609, named for Martin Luther King Jr.) near the intersection with Virginia Avenue, the station is a two side platform, two track structure on the West Side Avenue branch of the Hudson–Bergen Light Rail. Train service through Martin Luther King Drive station goes from West Side Avenue in Jersey City to the Tonnelle Avenue station in North Bergen. The station is accessible for those with disabilities as part of the Americans with Disabilities Act of 1990 with ramps to the train-level platform. Martin Luther King Drive station opened on April 15, 2000 along with the rest of the West Side Avenue branch as part of the original operating segment.

== History ==
=== Jersey Central station ===
Martin Luther King Drive station is located just east of the former Central Railroad of New Jersey station at the same street, Jackson Avenue. Service in the area began a block west at Bergen Avenue in a cut through Bergen Hill for the Newark and New York Branch, a branch that ran from Broad Street station in Newark to the Communipaw station in Jersey City, where it met with the Central Railroad of New Jersey mainline, on July 23, 1869. In 1877, the station was moved east to the Jackson Avenue crossing. The station was replaced in 1892 and once again in 1911. The CNJ and Lehigh Valley Railroad shared the station from 1913 to 1918. Service to Lafayette Street ended abruptly on February 3, 1946, when a steamship crashed into a bridge over the Hackensack River, taking out two spans. Service to Jackson Avenue for passengers as a result ended on May 6, 1948. The CNJ sold the ornate 1911 station in 1951 for various purposes and was demolished after Autumn 2011.

=== HBLR station ===
The station opened on April 15, 2000. It was raised to a level crossing to improve pedestrian access. It is the site of the Martin Luther King, Jr. Memorial in Jersey City.

In early 2019, it was announced that the West Side Avenue, Martin Luther King Drive, and Garfield Avenue stations on the West Side Branch would close for nine months starting in June 2019 for repairs to a sewer line running along the right-of-way. During that time, replacement service would be provided by NJ Transit shuttle buses.

== Station layout ==
Sited at its entrance is Martin Luther King, Jr. Memorial. and other related public art.

== Vicinity ==
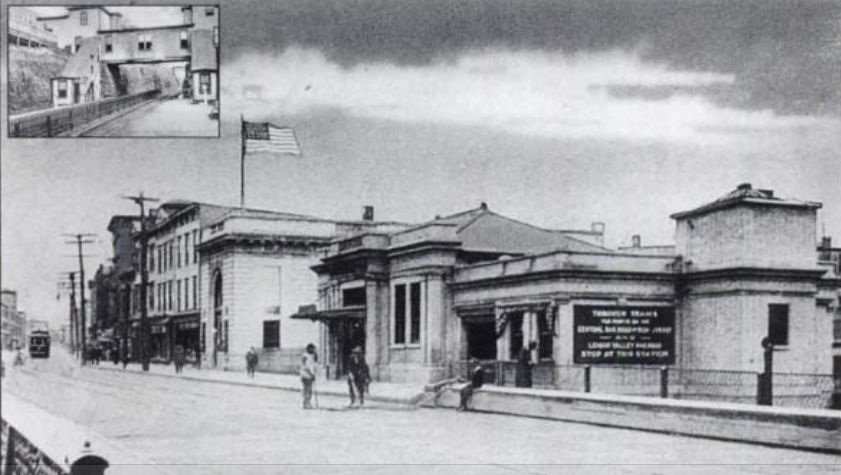
1915 view of Jackson Avenue station

Martin Luther King Drive was once called Jackson Avenue, and until 1947, Public Service Railway's # 7 Jackson streetcar line ran along it. A small block called Jackson still exists that was not included in a realignment. It was later named in honor of the slain civil right leader Martin Luther King, Jr., who had twice spoken in the city. The drive has been the heart of the African American community in Jersey City for decades, and has sometimes been called "The Hill", though the area is not within the state designated Bergen Hill Historic District. The 100th affiliate of the National Urban League is located on MLK Drive., which is one of the city's shopping districts. The Cunningham Branch of the Jersey City Public Library, the city's newest branch, named for former mayor Glenn Dale Cunningham, is located on MLK Drive. Lincoln High School and St. Patrick's Parish and Buildings are nearby, both northeast of the station.
