= Garfield Avenue station =

Light rail station in New Jersey, US

Garfield Avenue
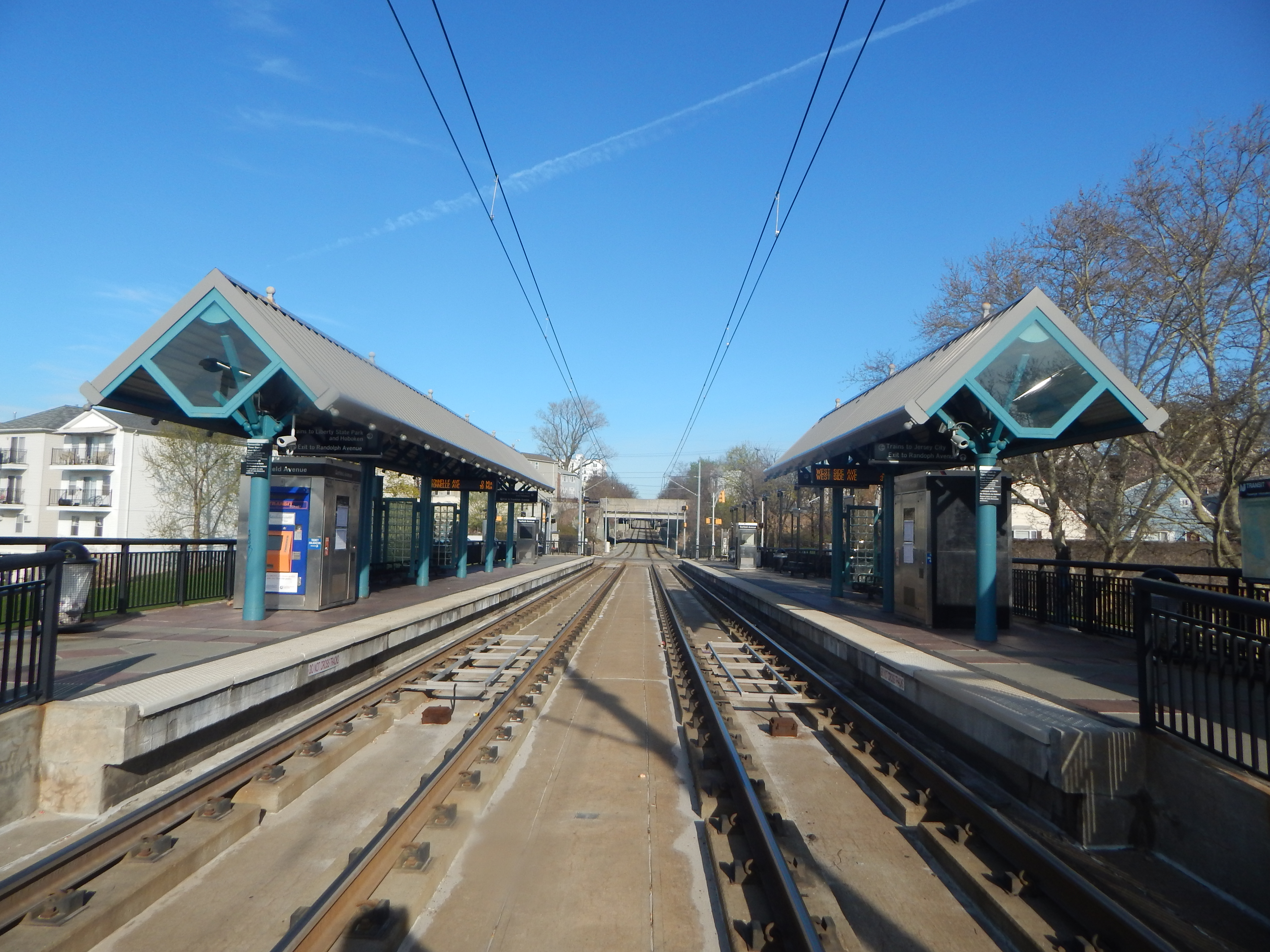
- Garfield Avenue station platforms in April 2015, facing toward West Side Avenue

General information
- Location: Garfield Avenue & Randolph Avenue; Jersey City, New Jersey
- Coordinates: 40°42′38″N 74°04′16″W
- Owner: New Jersey Transit
- Platforms: 2 side platforms
- Tracks: 2
- Connections: NJ Transit Bus: 6

Construction
- Cycle facilities: Yes
- Accessible: Yes

Other information
- Fare zone: 1

History
- Opened: April 15, 2000

Passengers
- 2025: 1,224(average weekday)
- Rank: 22 of 24

Services
Preceding station	NJ Transit	Following station
Martin Luther King Drive toward West Side Avenue	West Side–Tonnelle	Liberty State Park toward Tonnelle Avenue
Former services
Preceding station	Central Railroad of New Jersey	Following station
Jackson Avenue toward Newark Broad Street	Newark and New York Branch Local Arlington Avenue	Pacific Avenue toward Jersey City
Location

Garfield Avenue station is a station on the Hudson–Bergen Light Rail (HBLR) in the Claremont section of Jersey City, New Jersey, United States. Located between the grade crossing at Randolph Avenue and the bridge at Garfield Avenue, the station in a double side platform and two track structure. The station is on the West Side Avenue branch of the Hudson–Bergen Light Rail, which goes from West Side Avenue station to Tonnelle Avenue station in North Bergen. The station is accessible for handicapped people as per the Americans with Disabilities Act of 1990. An elevator is present to get people from Garfield Avenue to track level and the platforms are even with the train cars. The station opened to the public on April 15, 2000 as part of the original operating segment of the Hudson–Bergen Light Rail.

Garfield Avenue station is a block east of the former Arlington Avenue stop of the Newark and New York Branch, a branch of the Central Railroad of New Jersey. This branch went from the Broad Street station in Newark to the junction at Communipaw station in Jersey City, where it met up with the main line to Communipaw Terminal. Garfield Avenue is also two blocks west of the former Pacific Avenue station. Pacific Avenue station, formerly known as Lafayette, contained a 36-by-17-foot (11.0 m × 5.2 m) station depot. Service on the line began on July 23, 1869. The station depot westbound at Arlington Avenue was built in 1889 and the eastbound station in 1910. Service to Newark ended abruptly on February 3, 1946 when a steamship knocked two spans of the bridge over the Hackensack River into the water below. Passenger service at Arlington Avenue ended on May 6, 1948.

== History ==
The station opened on April 15, 2000.

In early 2019, it was announced that the West Side Avenue, Martin Luther King Drive, and Garfield Avenue stations on the West Side Branch would close for nine months starting in June 2019 for repairs to a sewer line running along he right-of-way. During that time, replacement service would be provided by NJ Transit shuttle buses.

== Station layout ==
The station is at the eastern end of a railroad cut originally excavated in Bergen Hill in 1869 for the Central Railroad of New Jersey Newark and New York Railroad Branch. Garfield Avenue, presumably named for assassinated president James A. Garfield, was once part of Bergen Point Plank Road, which itself had once been a major colonial post road. A decorative theme for the station is two dimensional "cut-outs" of adults and children, some of whom are playing.

== Gallery ==
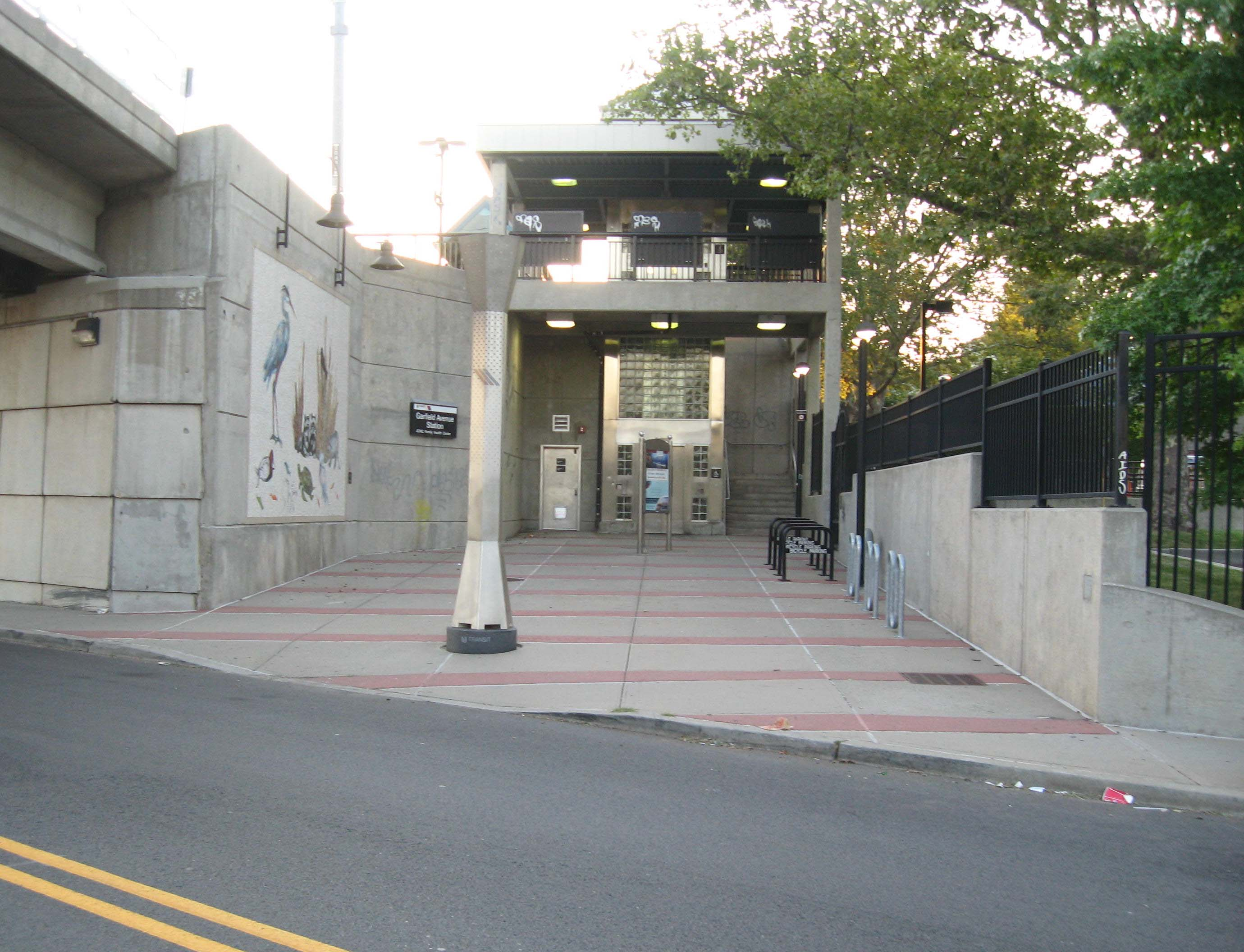
Street-level entrance on the northwest corner of the bridge

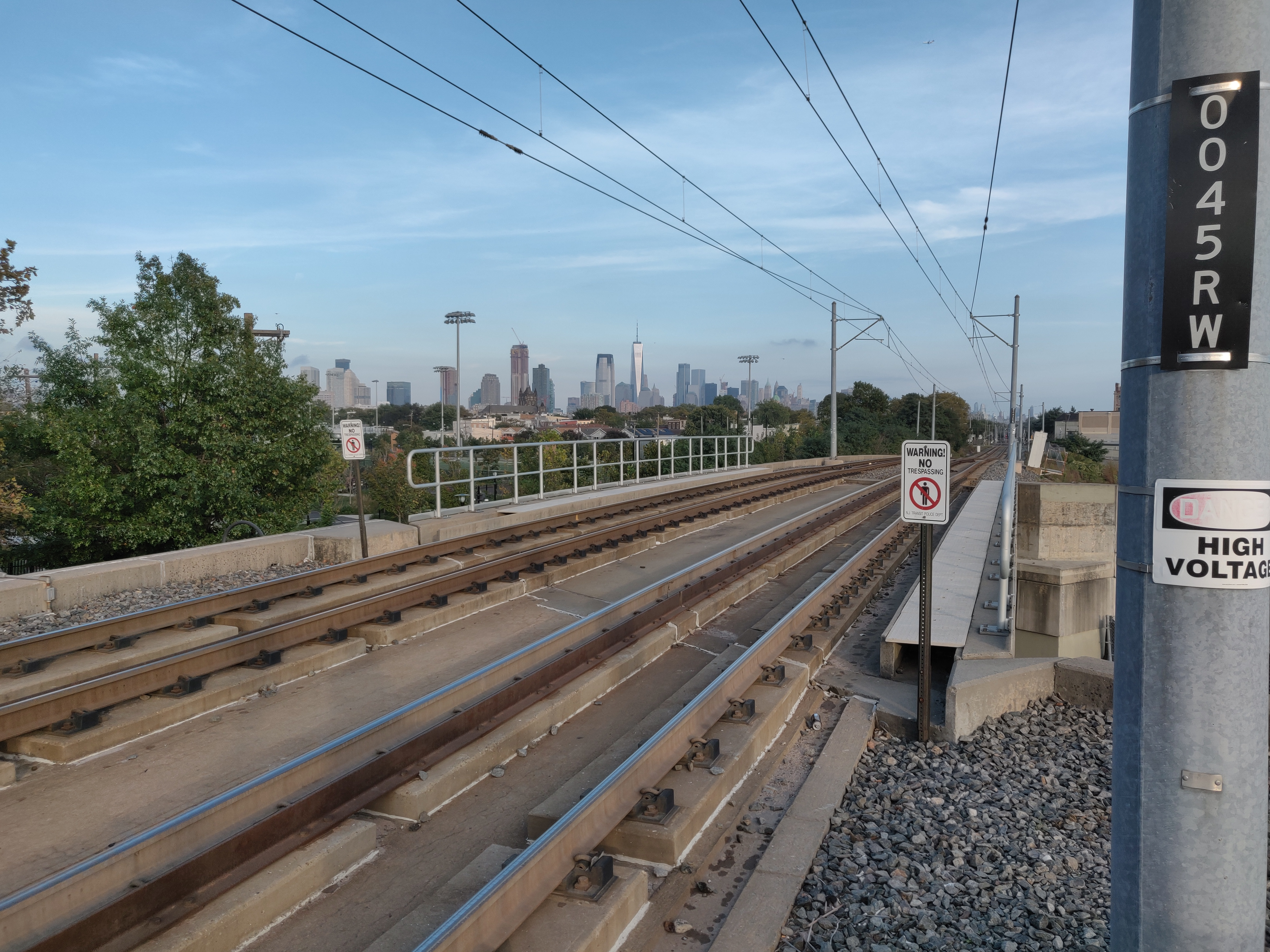
The light rail ROW east of the station and the Randolph Avenue crossing

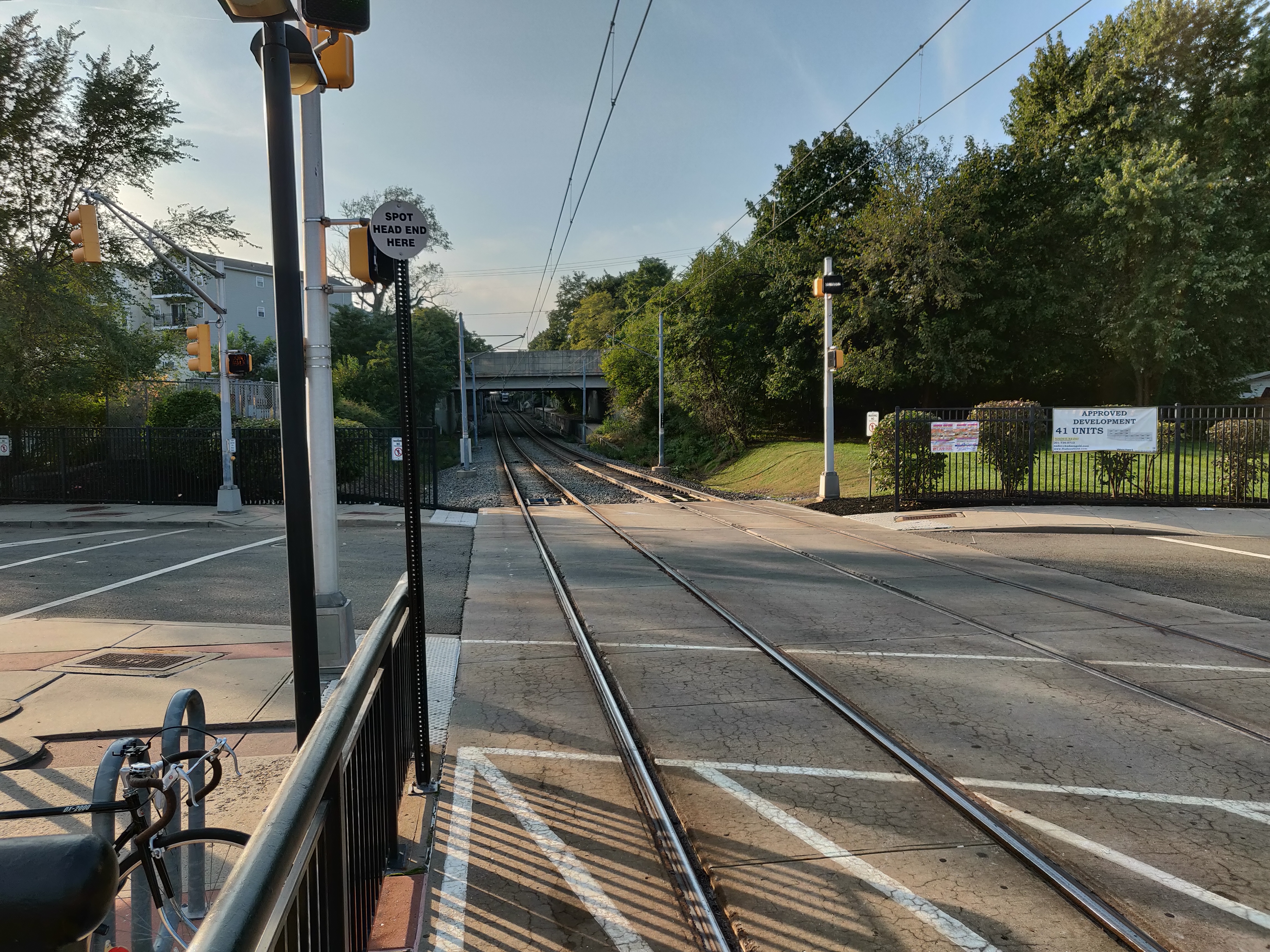
The light rail ROW west of the station

== Bibliography ==
- Bernhart, Benjamin L. (2004). Historic Journeys By Rail: Central Railroad of New Jersey Stations, Structures & Marine Equipment. Outer Station Project. ISBN 1-891402-07-2.
- New Jersey State Board of Taxes and Assessment (1916). First Annual Report of the State Board of Taxes and Assessment of the State of New Jersey For the Year 1915. Somerville, New Jersey: The Unionist-Gazette Association.
- Urquhart, Frank J. (2017). A History of the City of Newark, New Jersey, Volume 1. Altenmünster, Germany: Jazzybee Verlag Jürgen Beck. ISBN 978-3-8496-4990-6.
