= Western Slope =

Western Slope may refer to:

- Colorado Western Slope, a region of Colorado, US
- Western Slope, Jersey City, US
