= Rosie's Diner =

Diner in Michigan

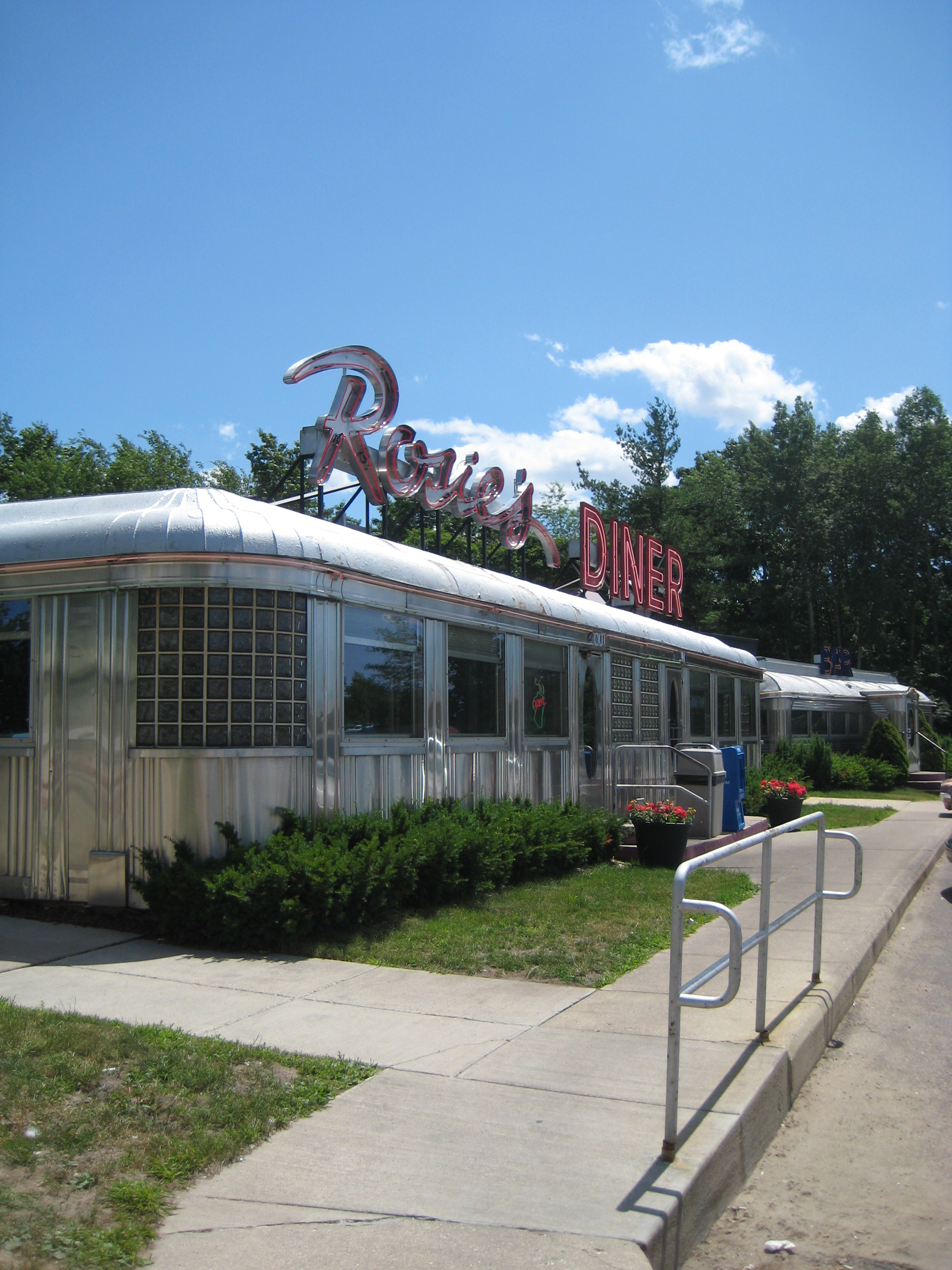
- Rosie's c. 2009

- Location in Michigan

Restaurant information
- Owner: Aaron Koehn
- Food type: Diner
- Location: 4500 14 Mile Road; Rockford, Michigan 49341
- Coordinates: 43.176187°N 85.558954°W
- Website: http://www.rosiesdiner.com/

Rosie's Diner is located in Rockford, Michigan. The dining car originally opened during the 1940s in Little Ferry, New Jersey, as the Silver Dollar Diner. After multiple commercials were filmed in the diner for Bounty paper towels with a fictional character named Rosie the Waitress, the diner was renamed Rosie's. Previously offered to the Smithsonian Institution, the restaurant was sold in the 1990s to a Michigan artist who had the building moved to its current location next to another diner. A third diner was later moved to the site from Fulton, New York. A series of replicas were built as part of a chain of restaurants in the Denver area.

== History ==
=== Origins ===
The restaurant was originally the Silver Dollar Diner in Little Ferry, New Jersey; it was built in 1946 by the Paramount Dining Car Company. The diner was located on U.S. Route 46 when it first opened in the 1940s. Rosie's was owned by Ralph Corrado Jr. and his father before him. Corrado renamed the restaurant after the waitress character from the commercials in 1970.

=== Bounty commercials ===
Two other commercials were previously filmed in the building, one for Sanka and another for Pepsi in the earlier days of the restaurant. However, the series of TV commercials that made the diner famous were for Bounty paper towels. They were filmed at the diner during the 1970s when it was known as the Farmland Diner (local Little Ferry residents affectionately referred to it as "The Greasy Spoon"). Clumsy patrons would knock over beverages, and Rosie the Waitress, played by Nancy Walker, would clean up the mess using Bounty paper towels, pronouncing the product the "quicker picker-upper". Two decades after the first commercials were filmed, Walker was still cleaning up after her television customers, but in a studio instead of in the diner. Other companies like Ethan Allen Furniture and Sony used the New Jersey diner location for their advertisements. After 45 years and countless commercials in Little Ferry, Corrado placed the restaurant for sale.

=== Move to Michigan ===
Corrado sold the land under the diner to the auto glass repair shop next door. The business did not want the diner, leaving it up to Corrado to sell the building. His offer to place "the most famous diner in America" in the Smithsonian Institution was rejected.

Jerry Berta is an artist that produces ceramic replicas of classic diners, with the original Rosie's as one of his inspirations. He owned one diner, a 1947 Jerry O’Mahoney Dining Car, located on the site in Michigan when he found out that the New Jersey diner was for sale. Berta bought Rosie's and moved it to Michigan at its current location. The purchase price at the time was $10,000 for the 24-by-60-foot (7.3 by 18.3 m) building. Work crews sawed the diner in half the week after it closed in 1990 in New Jersey to load it on flatbed trucks for the move to Michigan. The restaurant opened in its new location on July 5, 1991.

=== Expansion under Berta ===
The vintage two-diner collection expanded to three when Berta purchased the former Garden of Eatin' diner (a 1952 Silk City model) and moved it from Fulton, New York to the Michigan site in 1994. A fourth (reproduction) diner was also built on site as an addition. Known collectively as Dinerland USA, the location featured the Diner Store art gallery (in the Mahoney car), Rosie's Diner (the primary restaurant), and a 3 1/2 acre food-themed mini-golf course designed by Berta, where guests could putt around a big burger and slice of pie.

=== Development under the Roests ===
Jonelle and Randy Roest purchased the diner in January 2006. They reopened the Silk City car as a sports bar. The Mahoney car was opened seasonally as an ice cream shop. The mini-golf course was not reopened.

While under the Roests' ownership, the location received TV coverage on Food Network's Diners, Drive-Ins and Dives in 2007, and Travel Channel's Diner Paradise.

=== Closure ===
Rosie's Diner closed on October 2, 2011. The property was sold through online auction to Aaron Koehn of nearby Koehn Chevrolet, with a winning bid of $125,000. In September 2014, he offered tours of the buildings as part of a car show that attracted an estimated 3,000 people.

=== New shot at life in Missouri ===
In October 2023, Rosie's Diner was acquired by new owners, Dawn Perry and her husband. The couple announced plans to relocate the historic diner to central Missouri, between the cities of Columbia and Fulton, in spring 2024. The move aims to revitalize the establishment with extensive renovations planned, including updating the flooring and installing a full kitchen behind the service counter. The Perrys intend to restore the diner to its original charm, projecting a two-to-three-year timeline before reopening to the public. Once operational, the diner will feature a classic American menu, highlighting homemade dishes and milkshakes.A unique feature will be the "Vinny’s Kids Menu," tailored for young diners.Named in honor of Perry's youngest son.

The move to Missouri did not transpire due to logistical complications and costs. The Perry's sold the three diners (including Rosie's Diner) to Brian Barnette of Alabama. Brian began moving the diners September 2025 with unknown plans.

== Revitalization efforts ==
An effort to revitalize interest in Rosie's Diner was led by a Michigan photographer, Dana Kenneth Johnson, through a well-publicized Facebook post on March 2, 2017. It was illustrated with images of the diner in its current abandoned state. In a statement to Grand Rapids, Michigan-based ABC affiliate WZZM-13, owner Aaron Koehn said he was working with a nonprofit out of Kalamazoo with the hope they will restore the structures. In October 2018, one mini-golf website documented the present derelict state of the once-vibrant golf course. In 2021, owner Aaron Koehn again expressed an interest in finding a new home for the diner.

== Replicas ==
A series of replica diners were built by PMC Diners, the successor to Paramount Dining Car. A group of investors purchased the trademark to the Rosie's Diner name from Berta and Corrado in 2000, aiming to form a chain of restaurants in the Denver area. Currently, there are locations in Monument and Aurora.
