= Paramount Dining Car Company =

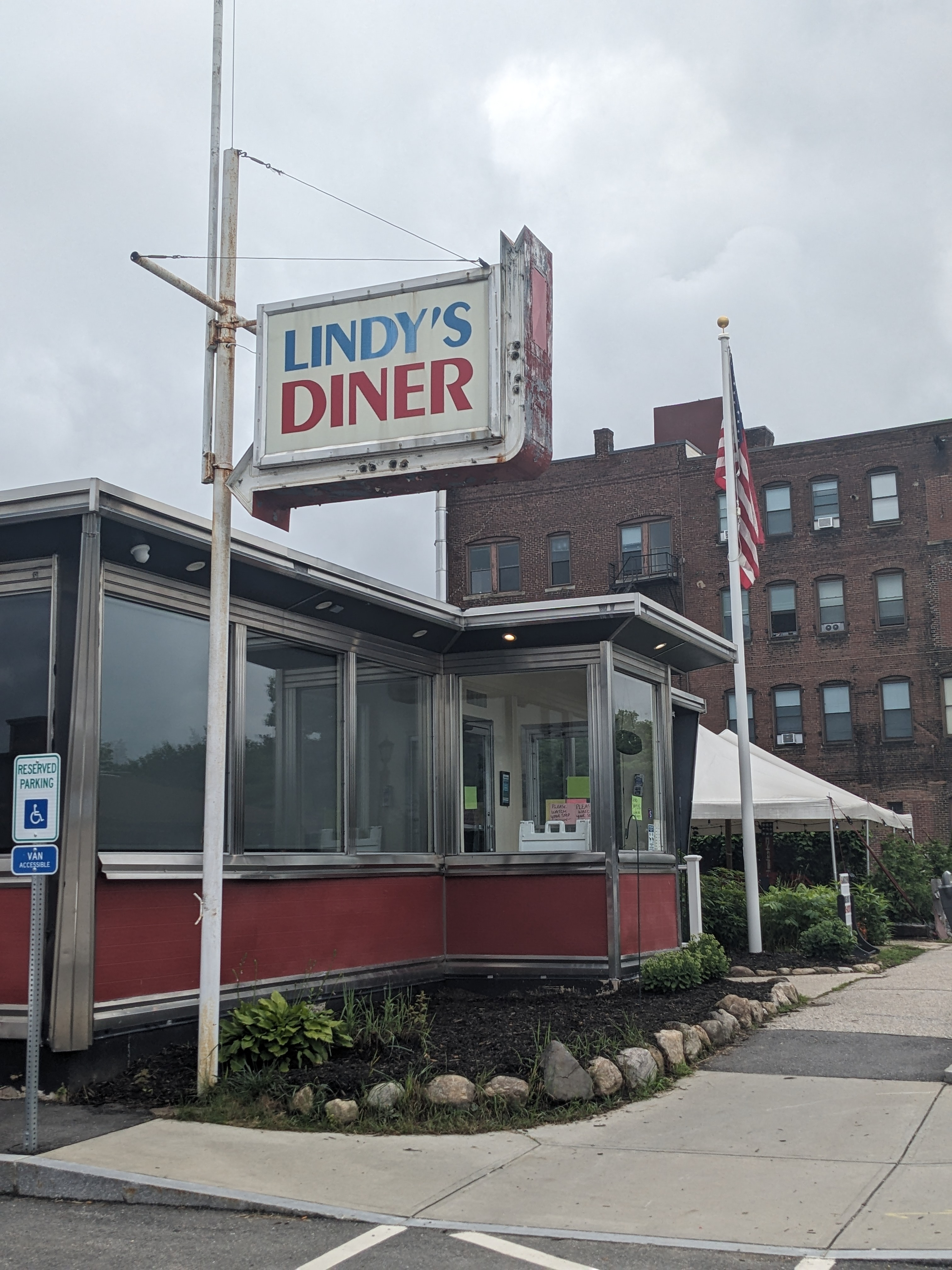

Paramount Dining Car Company was a manufacturer of stainless steel modular diners that was one of several such manufactures based in New Jersey. The company, founded by Arthur E. Sieber, was originally based in Haledon, New Jersey, and later relocated its facilities to Oakland, New Jersey. Sieber was granted patent 2,247,893 by the United States Patent Office on July 1, 1941, for his design of a portable diner that could be built in parts and assembled at a separate location.

== Description ==
Diners built by the company include White Manna in Hackensack, New Jersey and Jersey City, New Jersey. The Jersey City location was originally built by the company as a prototype that was used at the 1939 New York World's Fair and was then relocated to its site on Tonnelle Avenue (U.S. Route 1/9) after the fair was over. The Jersey City White Mana, an "N" was lost on the sign and the name left with one "N" rather than two, was designated by the city as a local landmark in 1997 to ensure its preservation.

Rosie's Diner is located in Rockford, Michigan, and was previously located at its original site on U.S. Route 46 in Little Ferry, New Jersey. The diner was constructed in the 1940s and was originally known as the Silver Dollar Diner. It was renamed after a series of commercials were filmed in the diner for Bounty paper towels with a fictional character named "Rosie the Waitress" played by actress Nancy Walker pitching the product as "the quicker picker-upper".

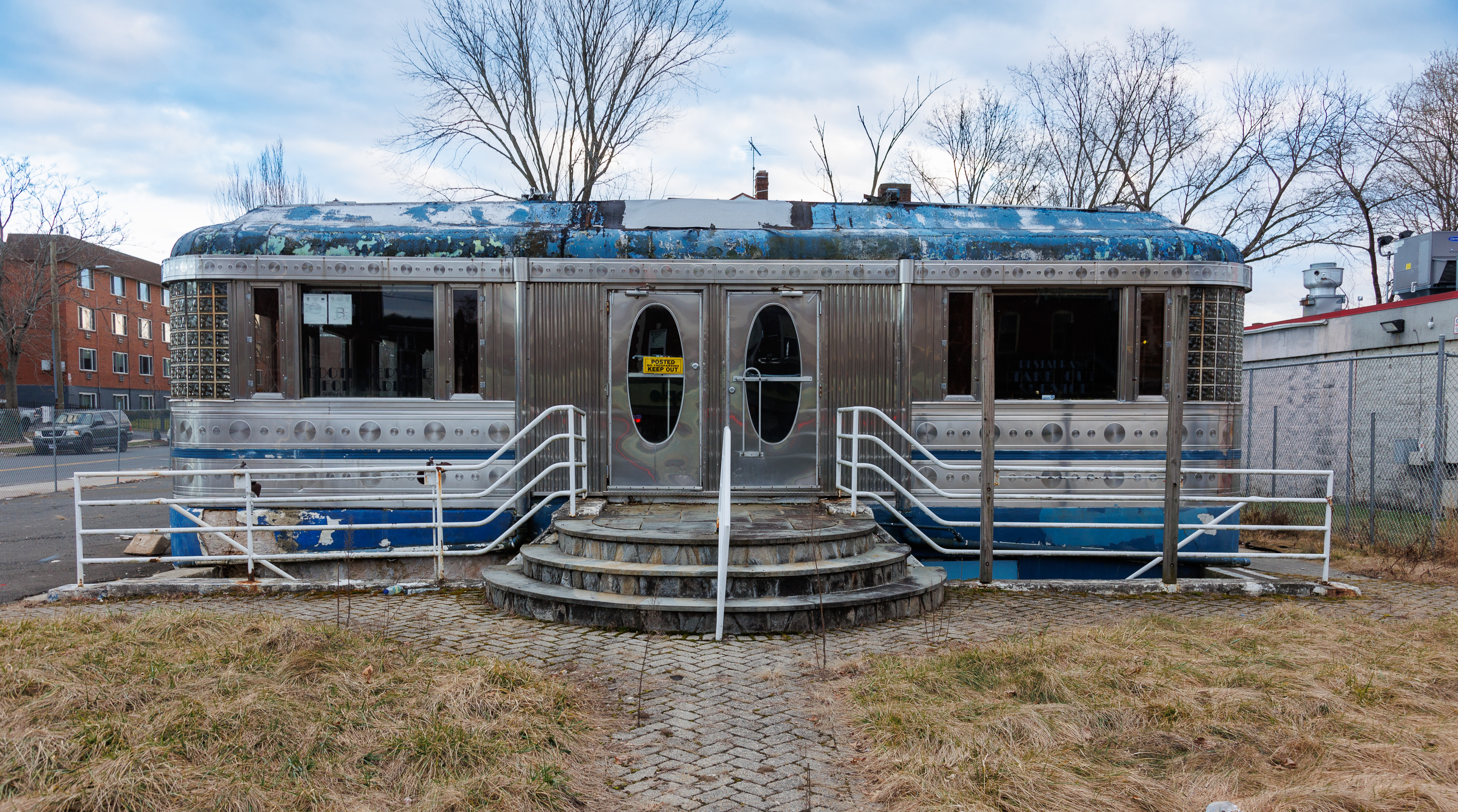
Aetna Diner, Hartford in 2024

Aetna Diner, located in the Asylum Hill neighborhood of Hartford, Connecticut, was built in 1947 by Paramount Diners and assembled on site in 1948, after the diner was shipped as three prefabricated stainless steel sections that were assembled on site. The diner was added to the National Register of Historic Places in 2021.
