= White Manna =

American fast food diner in New Jersey

White Manna of Hackensack's neon sign

White Manna and White Mana are the names of two fast food diners in the U.S. state of New Jersey, named after manna, the Biblical food. The restaurants were ranked on America's best burgers list along with White Rose Hamburgers, another New Jersey burger joint.

== History ==
The establishment was originally opened in Jersey City by Louis Bridges, who purchased the original diner that was introduced in the 1939 New York World's Fair in Flushing Meadows Park, Queens. Both buildings were manufactured by Paramount Dining Car Company of Oakland, New Jersey in 1939. Bridges owned five diners, all named "White Manna". It claims to be the home of the invention the Slider. In reality it is one of few surviving mid-20th century imitators of the White Castle hamburger slider chain established in 1921.

== Locations ==
=== Jersey City, New Jersey ===
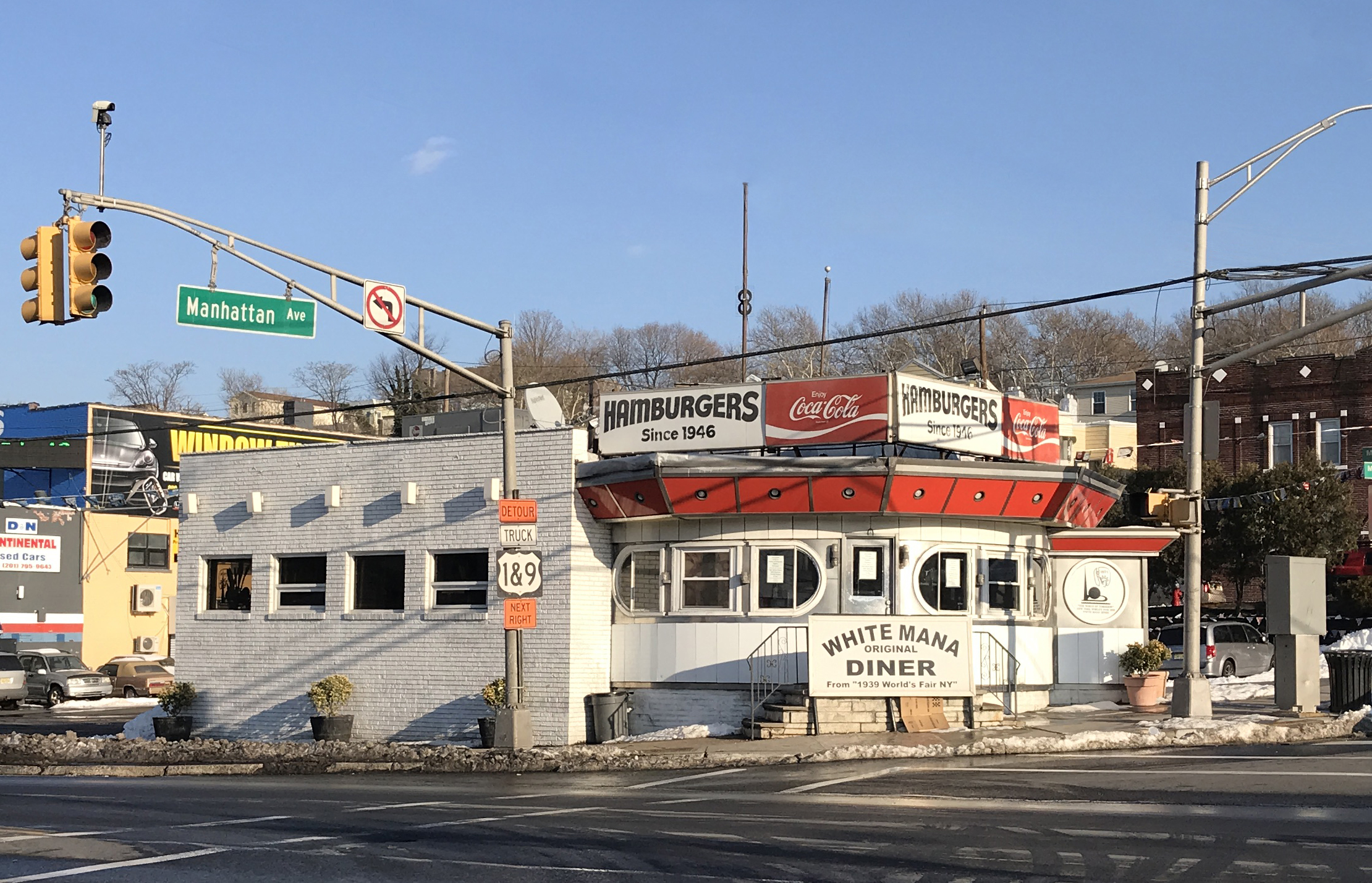
The White Mana in Jersey City

White Mana, located at 470 Tonnele Avenue (40°44′50″N 74°3′42″W) in the Western Slope neighborhood of Jersey City was the first White Manna to open, and consists of the original 1939 World's Fair building. When originally introduced, it was called the "diner of the future" and an "Introduction to Fast Food." According to the present owner, Mario Costa Jr., the difference in spelling was the result of an error when the sign was serviced. It is famous for its hamburgers and sells approximately 3,000 a week.

Costa, who had worked at the diner through high school and college, bought the diner for $80,000 in 1979 from Bridges’ brother Webster. In 1996, Costa decided to sell the diner and lot for $500,000, but soon regretted the deal when he discovered that the new owners intended to replace it with a doughnut franchise. Costa attempted to back out of the deal, but the buyers refused to void the transaction. He filed a lawsuit to stop the sale, but lost. Eventually, the buyers agreed to sell it back to him at a higher cost than their purchase price.

In 1997, the Jersey City Historic Preservation Committee declared the diner a local landmark.

=== Hackensack, New Jersey ===
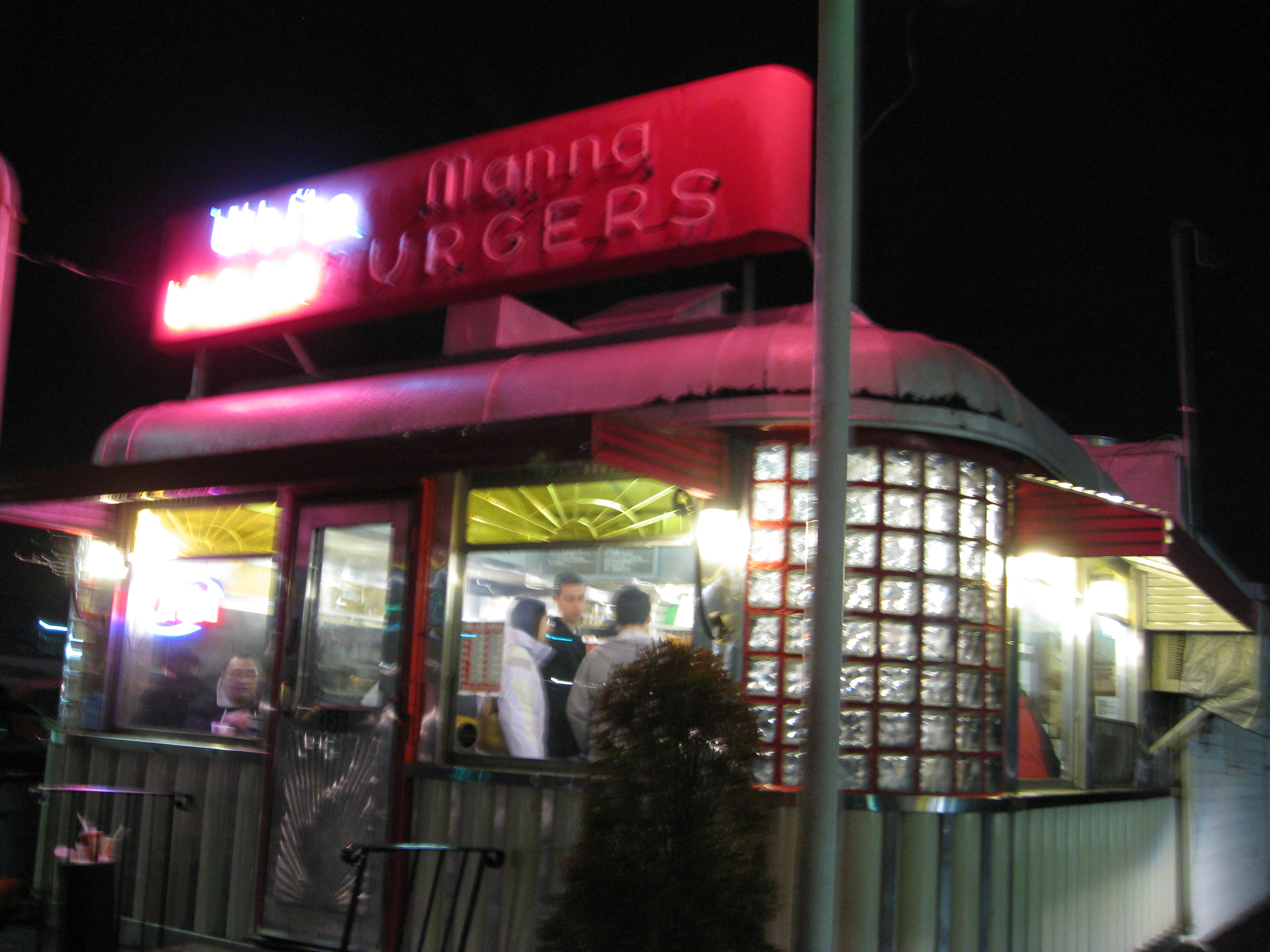
The White Manna in Hackensack

The Hackensack White Manna Diner is a fast food restaurant located at 358 River Street. (40°53′21″N 74°2′19″W) The diner has been at the site on the banks of the Hackensack River since 1946.

The White Manna Diner of Hackensack has also been featured on the Food Network television series Diners, Drive-Ins and Dives and The Best Thing I Ever Ate, as well as Man v. Food and Anthony Bourdain: No Reservations on the Travel Channel. It appeared in Dom Eats Local.

In addition, the diner's burgers have been featured in numerous articles including being named the best burger in New Jersey by Thrillist, listed in the top 101 burgers in America by The Daily Meal, and being in GQ's "20 Hamburgers You Must Eat Before You Die."

Both the Hackensack White Manna and Jersey City White Mana were featured in the "American Food Feud" episode of the Food Network series Food Feuds.

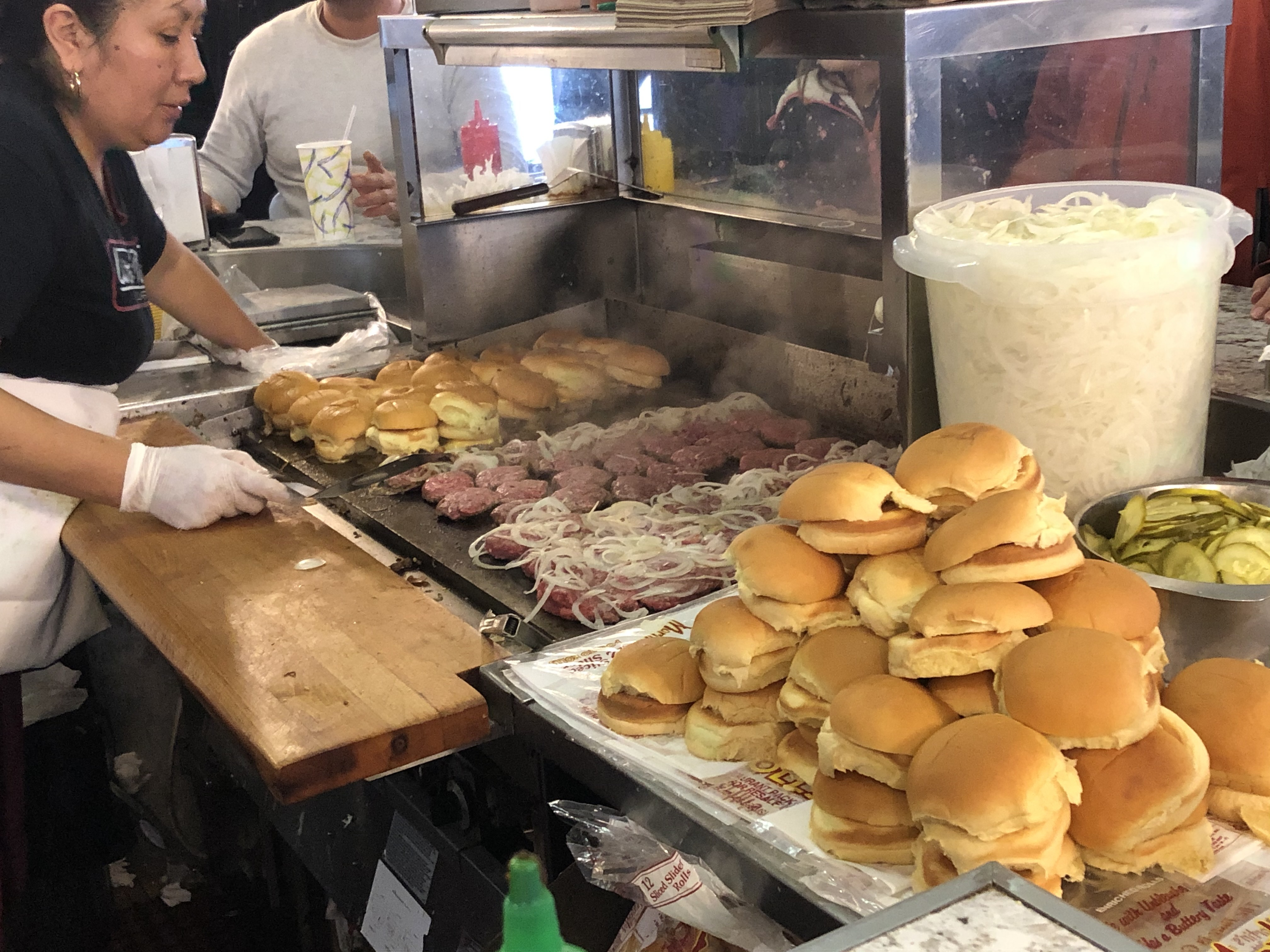
Hamburgers on the grill at White Manna in Hackensack, NJ

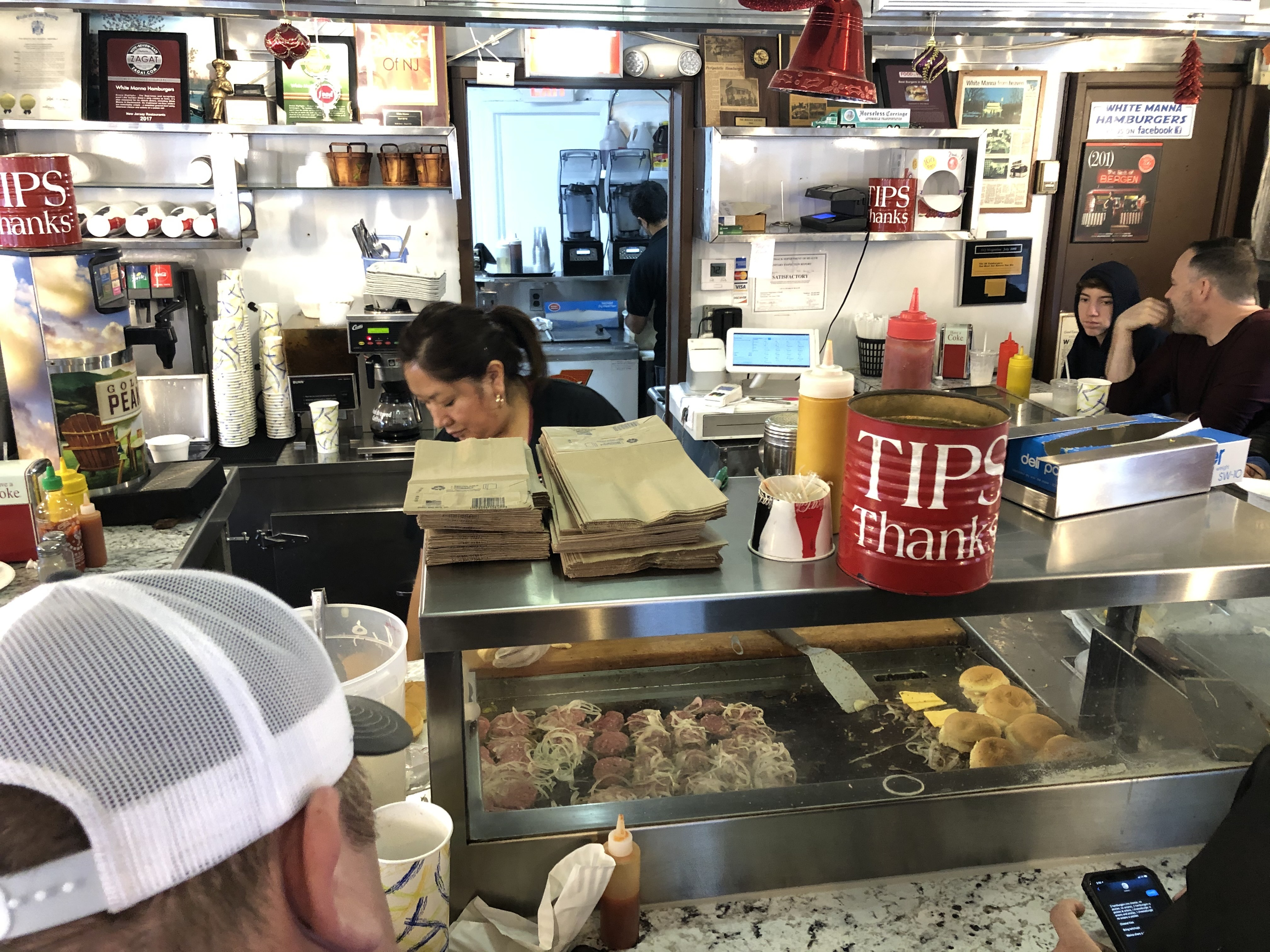
The counter at White Manna in Hackensack, NJ

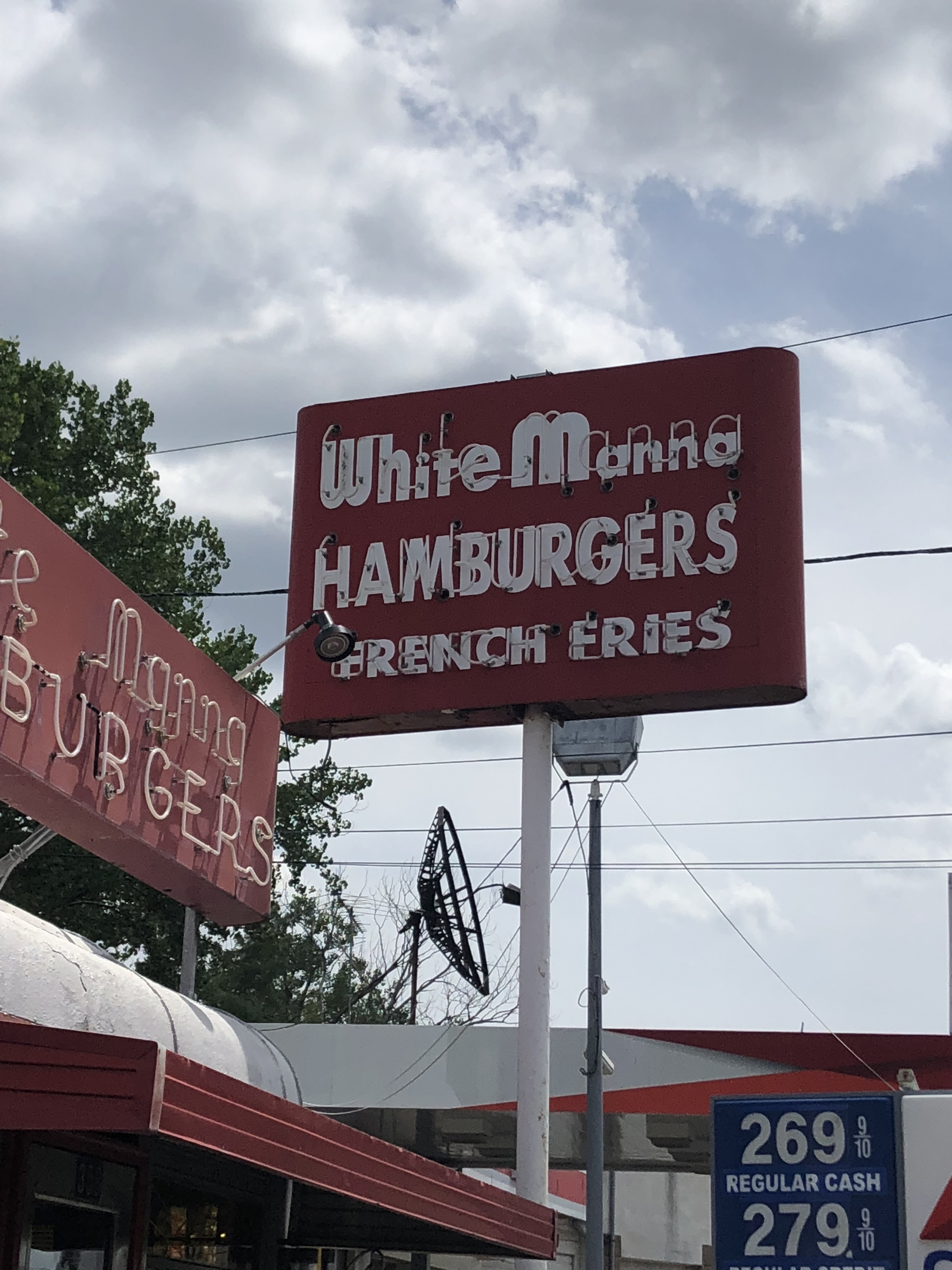
The "White Manna Hamburgers French Fries" sign at the location in Hackensack, NJ
