= August Will =

August Will (1834–1910) was a German-American artist who spent the majority of his life living in Jersey City, New Jersey.

He was born in Weimar, Germany and immigrated to the New York City and New Jersey region when he was a young man. Although he always signed his paintings simply with the name, August Will, his full birth name was John M. August Will.

Will settled in Jersey City, where he remained until his death.

Little is known about Will's early life. However, it is known that Will enjoyed success as a well-known local artist who created illustrations for the Century Company in New York City as well as one who instructed students in his Jersey City studio.

Working with the mediums of pen and ink, watercolors, and pastels, Will produced a large body work that consisted of portraits, landscapes, marine scenes, and city scapes. His work captured the unique era and epoch of his time and location.

The single largest collection of his works—more than 350 pieces—was in the permanent collection of the Jersey City Museum in Jersey City, New Jersey until 2018, when the entire body of his work held by that museum was donated to the Zimmerli Art Museum at Rutgers University, the state university.
