= Jersey City Museum =

Art museum in New Jersey, US (1901–2010)

Coordinates: 40.7197°N 74.0505°W

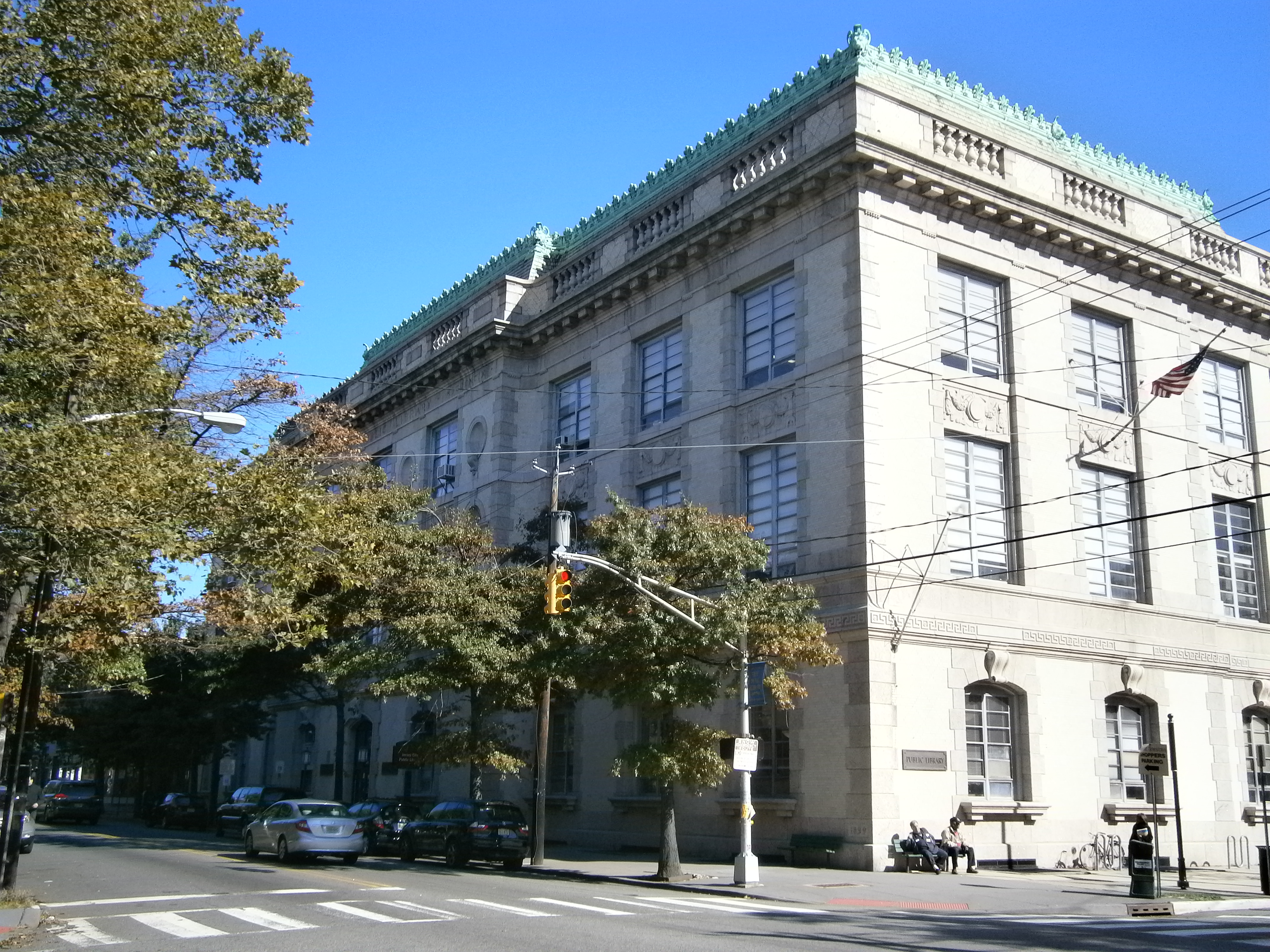
- The original museum at the Jersey City Free Public Library, opened in 1901.
- Established: 1901
- Dissolved: 2010
- Location: Jersey City, New Jersey, United States
- Type: Art

The Jersey City Museum was a municipal art museum in Jersey City, New Jersey, United States, which opened in 1901 in the main branch of the Jersey City Free Public Library. It relocated to a new building in 2001, but due to financial difficulties and discord with the city closed to the public in 2010. In 2018, the museum collection was donated to the Zimmerli Art Museum at Rutgers University.

In 2018, the Jersey City municipal government began the process of establishing a new museum in a historic building at Journal Square. It was expected to open as Centre Pompidou x Jersey City, a satellite museum of the Centre Pompidou, and exhibit works of the twentieth and twenty-first centuries from the Pompidou collection, but funding for the project was withdrawn by the state.

== History ==
=== 1901–2000 at Jersey City Public Library ===
The Jersey City Museum dates back to 1901, when its collection was housed on the fourth floor of the Jersey City Free Public Library on Jersey Avenue, in the Van Vorst Park section of downtown. It closed in 1953 for lack of funding and re-opened in 1975. Jersey City historian J. Owen Grundy served five times as the museum president.

The collection remained under the aegis of the library until 1987, when the museum association initiated efforts for the founding of a separate nonprofit institution. In 1993, the Jersey City Redevelopment Agency (JCRA) donated a building on Montgomery Street for display of the museum collection.

=== 2001–2013 at Montgomery Street ===
The museum relocated to a new location (also in the Van Vorst Park section) in 2001. The cream-colored brick building at 350 Montgomery Street, a former post office warehouse circa 1929, was renovated at the cost of $6.5 million, to become the museum's next location. Designed by architect Charles Alling Gifford, the interior offered a modern space enhanced by a skylight lobby. The re-fitted building included several galleries, a 152-seat theater, museum offices, a classroom, and a gift shop.

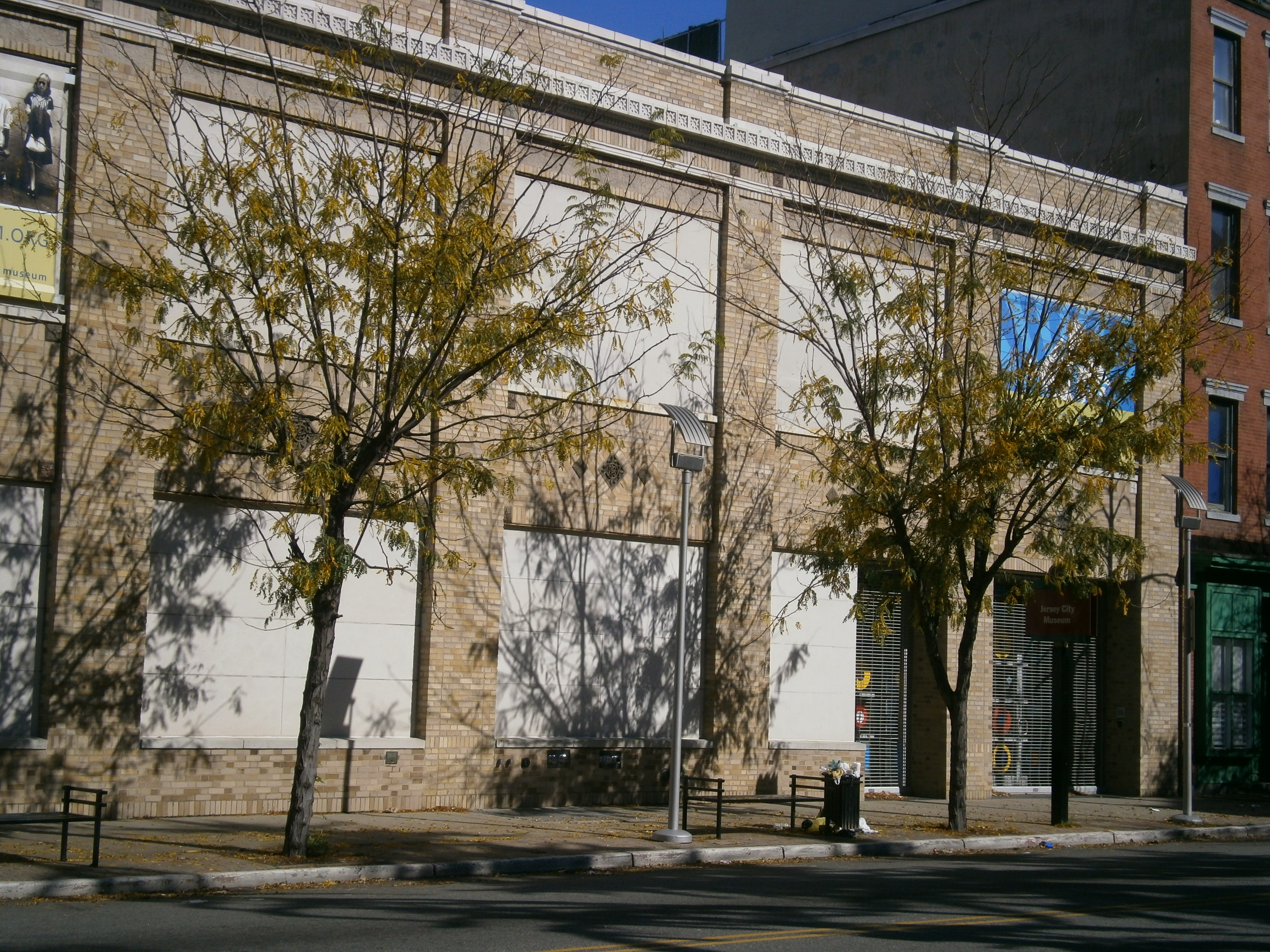
In 2001, the museum relocated to Montgomery Street.

The stated mission of the museum was to serve the community by "maintaining, preserving, and interpreting the region's cultural heritage". In order to stimulate community participation in the visual arts and to reflect the cultural diversity of New Jersey, the museum gave special attention to the exhibition of contemporary art, and it recognized the visual artists residing in New Jersey and its metropolitan area. For example, the museum hosted the debut of a solo exhibition of the works of Priscila De Carvalho.

Due to financial difficulties and in danger of losing the building, the museum closed to the general public in December 2010, amid speculation that it might not reopen. However, the building was purchased by the Jersey City Medical Center in February 2012 for partial use as offices, with the remaining space and theater dedicated to display of the museum collection that reopened in June, but closed permanently soon thereafter. A 2015 court ruling decided that the city government was not obligated to financially support the museum and that the collection belonged to the museum association.

=== 2018 donation to Rutgers ===
The museum's collection comprises American art and material culture from the colonial period through the present, including painting, sculpture, decorative arts, photography, works on paper, furniture, metals, textiles, maps, industrial objects, and ephemera. It included works by contemporary artists David Wojnarowicz, Chakaia Booker, and Emma Amos, pieces by Colin Campbell Cooper, and a large body of work by nineteenth-century painter August Will.

In 2018, the museum collection (estimated between 5,000 and 10,000 works) was donated to the Zimmerli Art Museum at Rutgers University. The opening of the Museum of Jersey City History offers the possibility for some of the collection to be returned to the city.

=== Pathside building ===
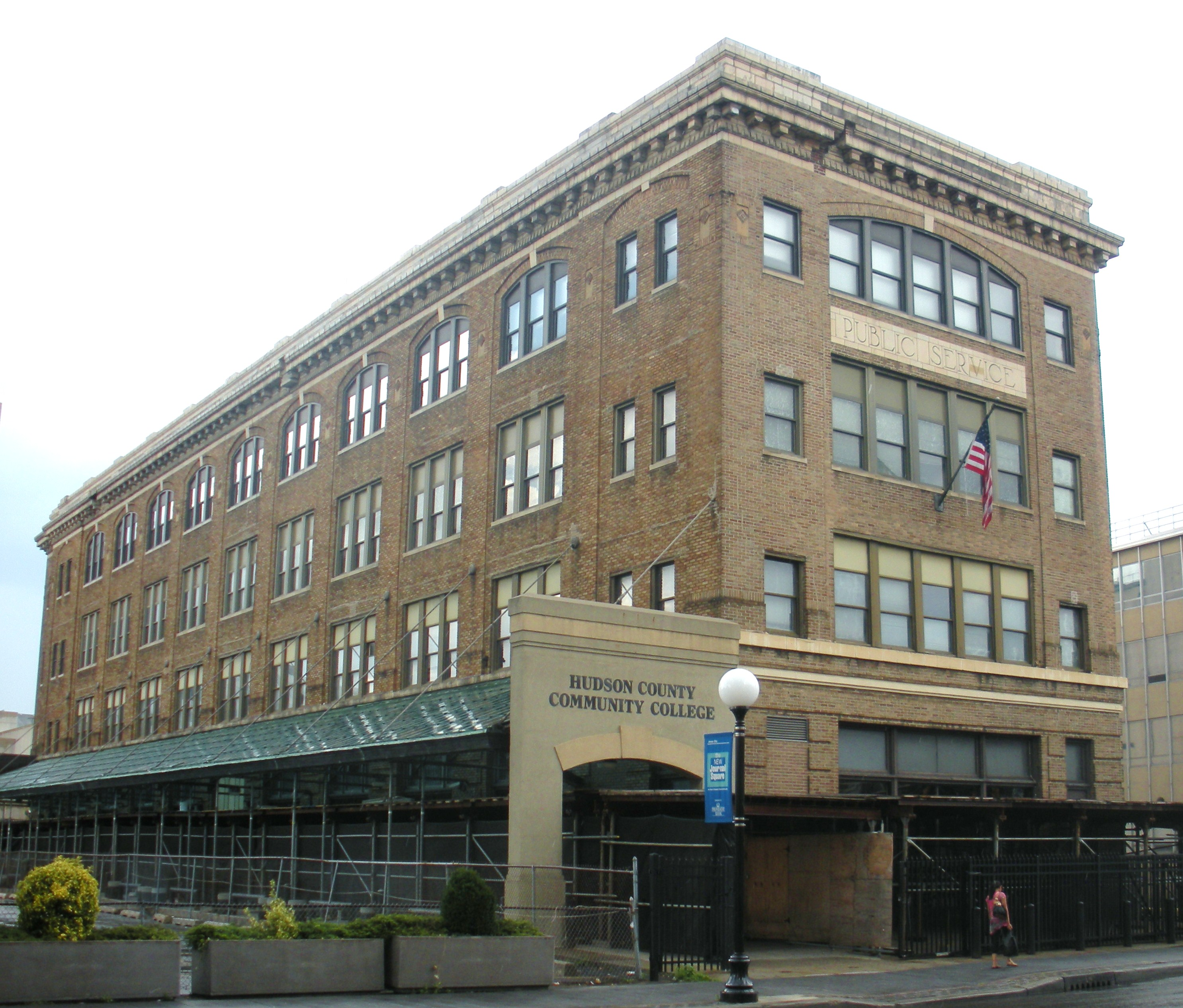
The Journal Square building was purchased from Hudson County Community College in 2018.

In April 2016, the city government announced that it was considering purchasing the building at 25 Journal Square. The structure had been built in 1912 as part of the Public Service transportation hub for its streetcar lines. That corporation became known as Public Service Electric and Gas Company, whose transportation business became the nucleus of the NJ Transit bus network and the Newark City Subway. The building had been purchased in 1996 by Hudson County Community College, which renamed it to "Pathside". The college used the building until 2017. The city purchased the edifice through its redevelopment agency, JCRA, in 2018 and, after an RFP, awarded Office of Metropolitan Architecture the commission to conceive and design a new space for a new Jersey City Museum.

==== Centre Pompidou x Jersey City ====
In June 2021, the city announced that the Pathside building would be renovated for use as a satellite of the Centre Pompidou in Paris, known as Centre Pompidou x Jersey City. Under a five-year extendable contract, the renovated Pathside would house an exhibition of artworks from Centre Pompidou, following closure of the Paris museum for a three-year renovation. Renovation costs were estimated to be $30 million on top of the $9 million purchase price and would be largely funded by the state. An opening in early 2024 was scheduled, with works of the 20th and 21st centuries drawn from Pompidou's 120,000-piece collection. This was later postponed to 2026. New Jersey Republican Senator Michael Testa accused the project of excess, waste, and potential pay-to-play, and requested an audit by the state. As of November 2023, expected operating costs had not been made public. The New Jersey Economic Development Authority, which had earmarked $34 million for the project, said it would not release the funds until yearly operating expenses were clarified.

In June 2024, the state withdrew financial support for the project, calling it no longer viable. That September, Jersey City mayor Steven Fulop announced an alternative location at the Artwalk Towers high-rise development in Journal Square, though this was opposed by then-councilman James Solomon. Nonetheless, the Jersey City City Council voted to relocate the Centre Pompidou satellite location to 808 Pavonia Avenue later that month. After becoming mayor, Solomon announced in February 2026 that plans for the Centre Pompidou satellite in Jersey City had been abandoned. Instead, the site would become affordable housing.

== See also ==
- Museum of Russian Art
- Mana Contemporary
