= Aetna Diner =

- U.S. National Register of Historic Places
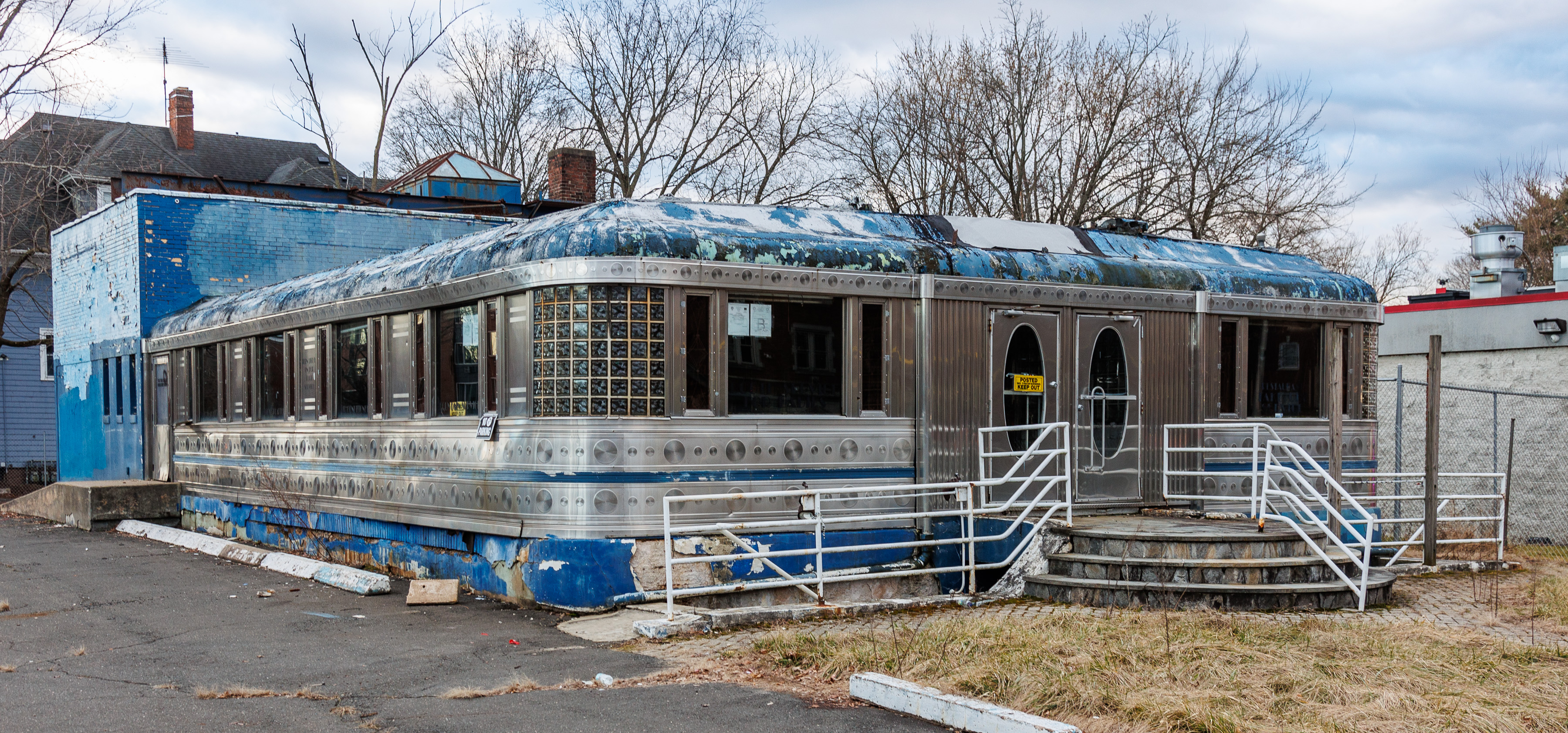
- March 2024

- Location within Connecticut Location within the United States
- Location: 267 Farmington Avenue, Hartford, Connecticut
- Coordinates: 41°46′03″N 72°41′51″W
- Area: 0.20 acres (0.081 ha)
- Architect: Arthur E. Sieber
- Architectural style: Modern Movement
- NRHP reference No.: 100006804
- Added to NRHP: August 18, 2021

Aetna Diner, also known as Comet Diner, Hog River Grille, and Dishes Restaurant, is a historic diner located at 267 Farmington Avenue in the Asylum Hill neighborhood of Hartford, Connecticut. Built in 1947 by Paramount Diners and assembled in 1948, the diner was prefabricated from stainless steel. Aetna Diner was listed on the National Register of Historic Places in 2021.

== Description and history ==
Manufactured by Paramount Dining Car Company in Haledon, New Jersey, the prefabricated diner car was transported by truck to Hartford in three sections, placed on a concrete basement foundation on the corner of Farmington Avenue and Laurel Street, and bolted together. Original owners Gus and Helen Vlecides ran the Aetna Diner for four decades. Built in the "streamliner" deluxe style and more than 32 feet (9.8 m) wide with 32 booths in three rows and a back bar with 25-stool counter, the diner became known for hosting dinners and dances. Eddie Fisher, Zsa Zsa Gabor and Telly Savalas ate there, and the owners catered events for Governor Ella Grasso.

Starting in 1984, the diner went through a series of renter and name changes. It had an eight-year run as the Comet followed by eight years as the Oasis and short-lived eras as the Hog River Grille, Mississippi Bar and Grille, and Dishes Restaurant through the early 2000s. The diner has remained vacant since Dishes closed. The building and parking lot are privately owned.

In 2024, a $3.1 million grant to restore and refurbish the diner as a community center was approved by the state.

== See also ==
- National Register of Historic Places listings in Hartford, Connecticut
- National Register of Historic Places listings in Hartford County, Connecticut
