= Jersey City Free Public Library =

Public library system in New Jersey, US

- 40.718948°N 74.047406°W
- Location: Jersey City, New Jersey, U.S.
- Established: 1889
- Branches: 10

Other information
- Website: jclibrary.org

The Jersey City Free Public Library (JCFPL) is the municipal library system of Jersey City, New Jersey, serving the residents of Hudson County. The library was established in 1889, opened in 1891, and had its first dedicated building, the main library, by 1901. Numerous branches have since opened and as of 2024 there are ten throughout the city as well as a bookmobile. It has over a million physical and digital items in its collection, making it the largest library system in the state.

== Founding ==
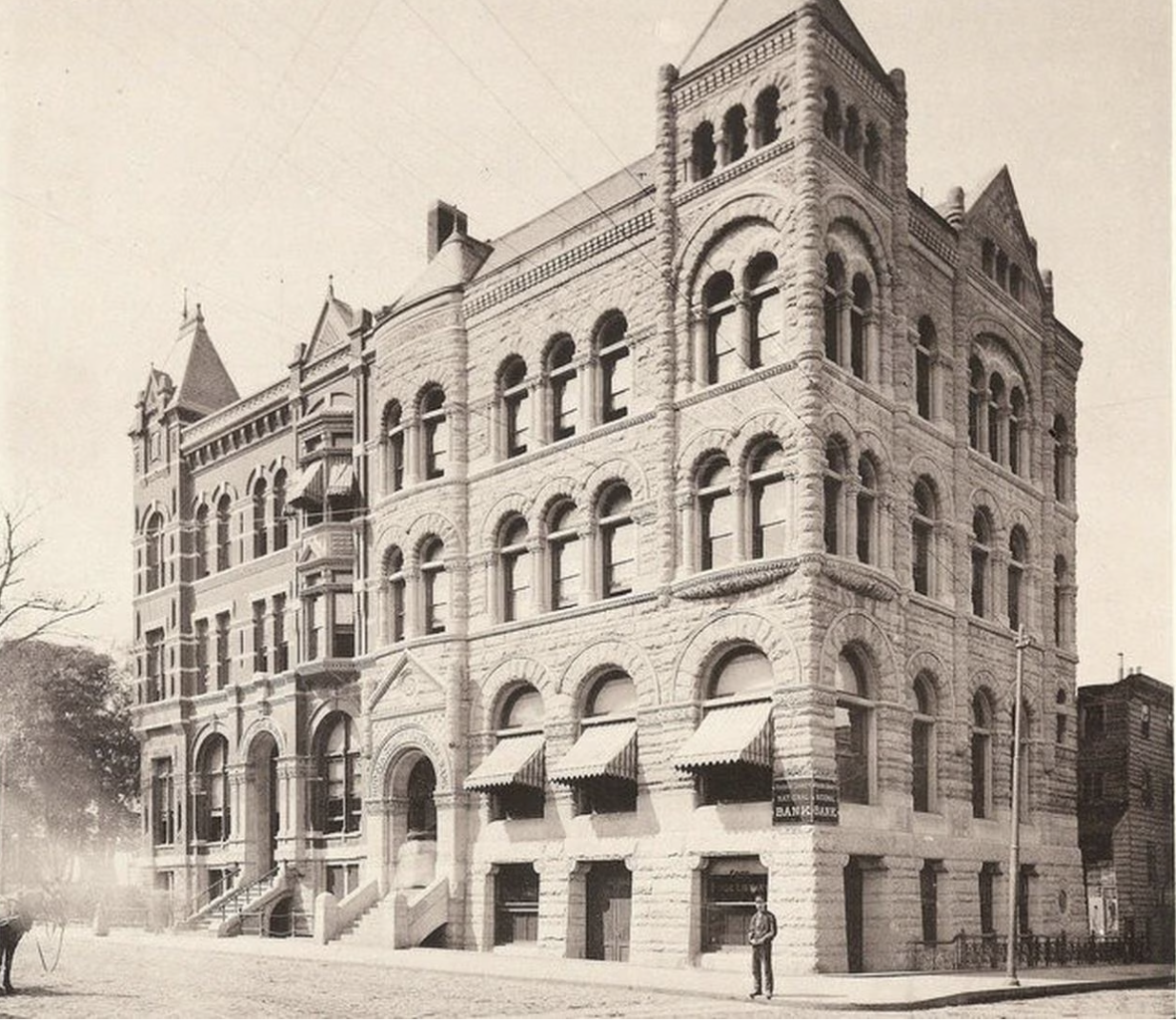
JCFPL was housed in the Provident Bank and Hudson National Bank on Washington Street before construction of the new library

The New Jersey Legislature passed a law in 1884 for the establishment of free public libraries when approved by local referendum. On April 9, 1889, after two earlier attempts, citizens of Jersey City voted for the provision (15,304 to 345) after which Mayor Orestes Cleveland appointed a board of trustees.

Dr. Leonard J. Gordon (1844–1905), for whom Dr. Leonard J. Gordon Park is named, was director of the library trustee board and a driving force in its creation. Despite the state mandate to fund public libraries the city resisted appropriating the resources; he took the matter to court, where the case was easily won.

The city's first public library opened on June 1, 1891, on Washington Street at the Provident Bank with a reading room in the adjacent Hudson National Bank . Over 4,000 volumes from the city's high school were incorporated into the original collection of about 15,000 books.

== Priscilla Gardner Main Library ==
The Main Library, a four-story Renaissance Revival granite building, is located on Jersey Avenue at Montgomery and Mercer in Historic Downtown. It is a contributing property to the state and federal Van Vorst Park historic district.

Following a design competition, the architectural firm of James Brite and Henry Bacon was selected and on August 16, 1899, the cornerstone was laid. It was first opened to the public on January 14, 1901. It began with 15,515 books in its collection. An addition was added to the rear of the building in 1926.

In addition to the main library, the building houses the New Jersey Room, a section dedicated to historical documents about New Jersey, with a focus on Hudson County and Jersey City. The room was created in 1964 to merge the collections of William H. Richardson and the Hudson County Historical Society with the material the library already possessed. The New Jersey Room holds over 20,000 volumes, in addition to historical maps and periodicals. Biblioteca Criolla, the system's Spanish language library, originally opened on Newark Avenue in 1972 but was incorporated into the main library in 2010. The building was also home to the Jersey City Museum until it was relocated in 2001.

An ongoing phased renovation and modernization of the building began in 2014, during which parts of the building were closed.

In 2019 the Main Library was dedicated to Priscilla Gardner, who had worked for 50 years for JCFPL. She started as a junior library assistant at the since-closed Claremont Branch in 1969, worked for 30 years at the Miller Branch, and became director in 2002.

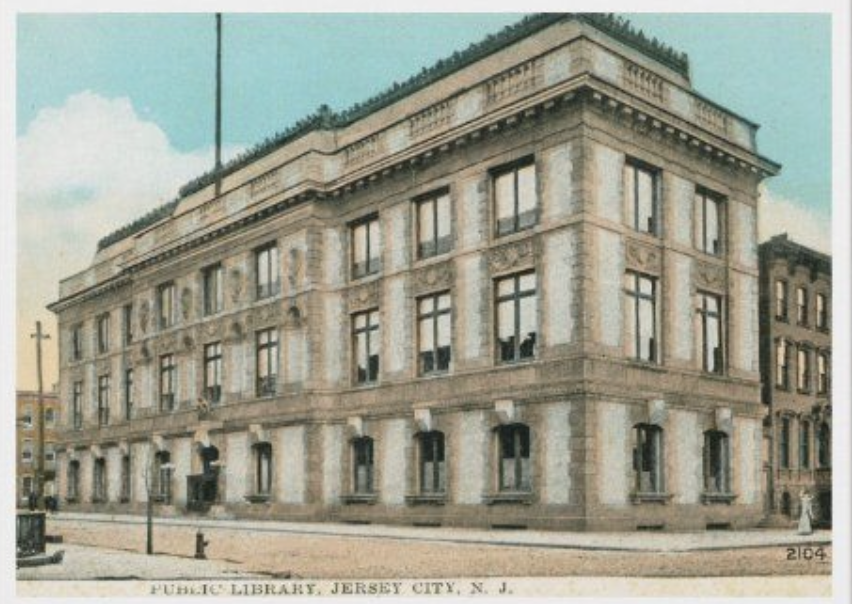
Postcard from soon after opening in 1901

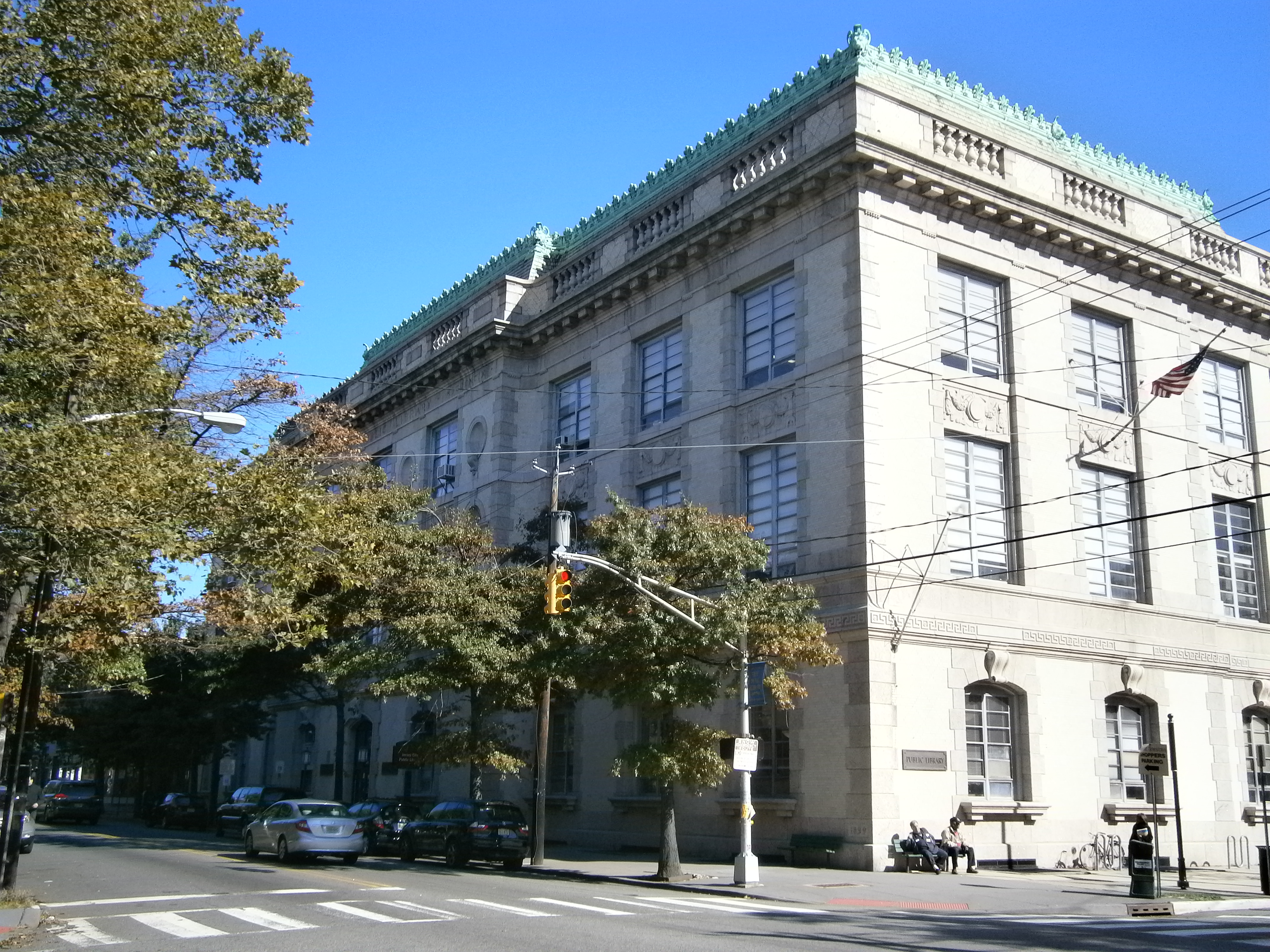
The Main Library housed the Jersey City Museum from 1901 to 2010

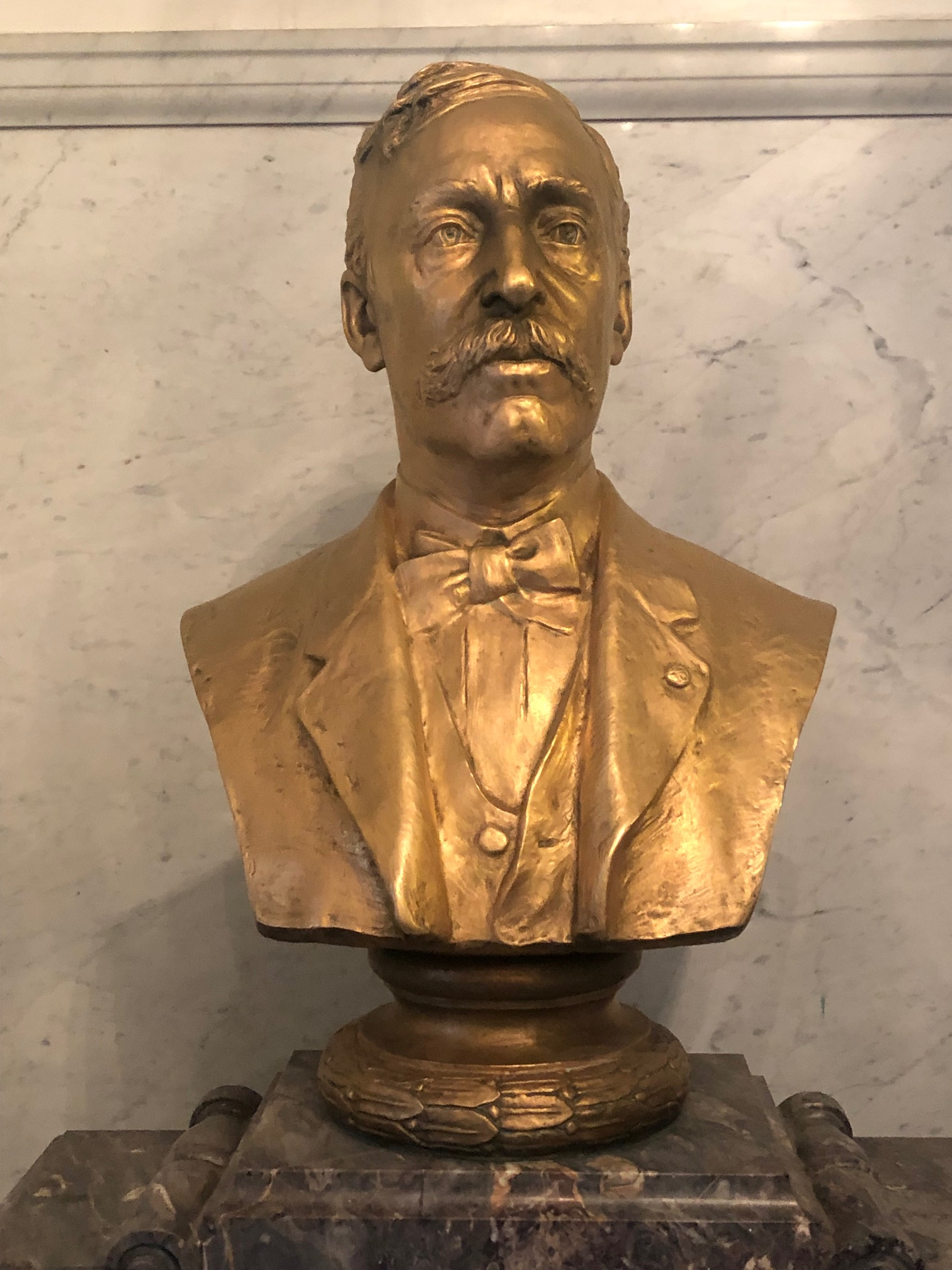
Bust of Dr. Leonard J. Gordon in foyer

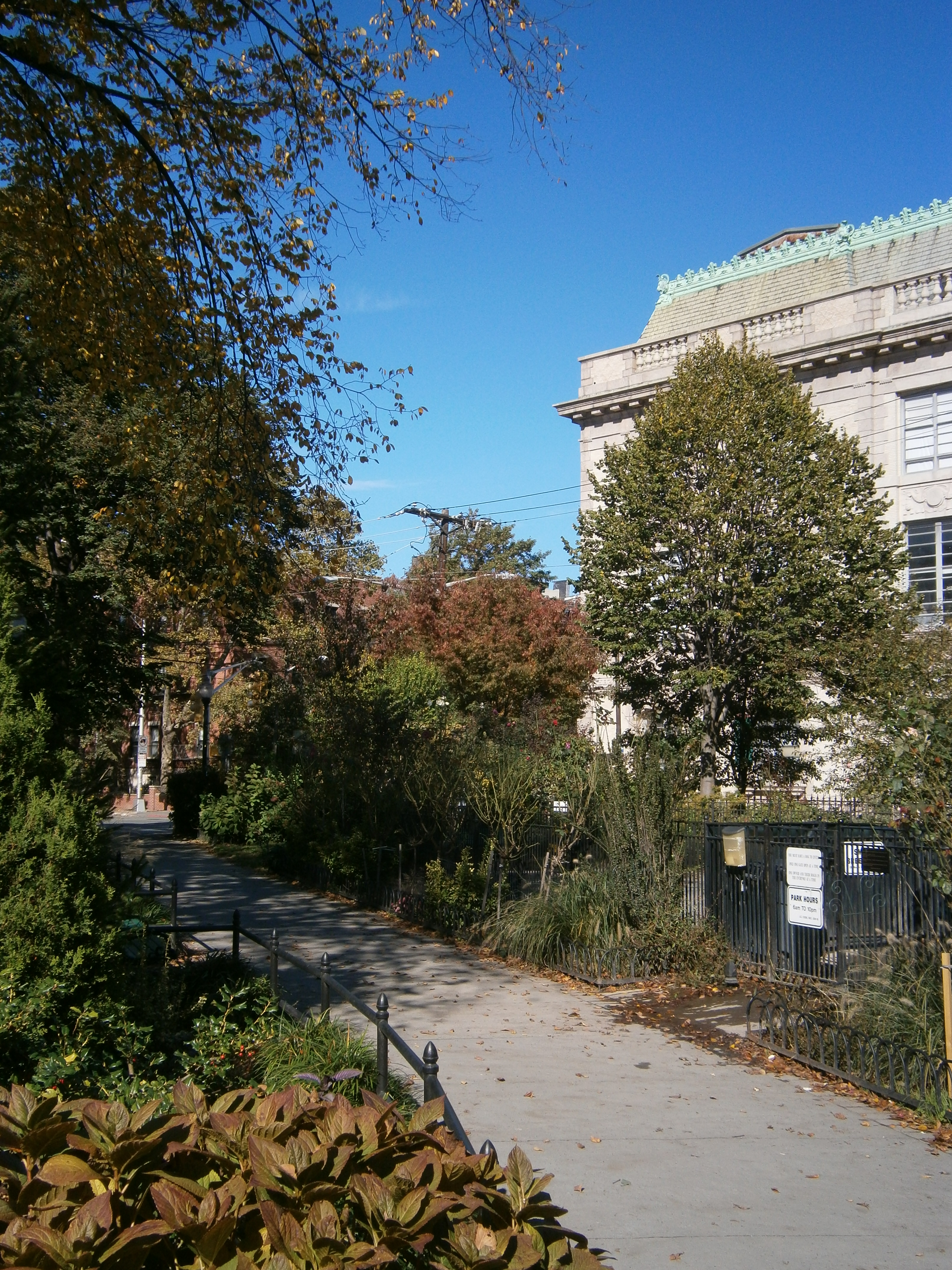
Contributing property to Van Vorst Park historic district

== Branches ==
In addition to the main library, there are ten branches throughout the city.

| Name | Image | Year (established, built) | Neighborhood | Notes |
|---|---|---|---|---|
| Heights Branch | | 1911, 1917 | The Heights | Originally called the Hudson City Branch (for the former municipality) it was housed on the second floor of building on Central Avenue until current facility was constructed. |
| Miller Branch | | 1915, 1921 | Bergen Section | Originally located on Jackson Avenue the current building was designed by Arthur Frederik Adams following a competition. Formerly known as the Bergen Branch, renamed for Edmund W. Miller who started working at JCFPL in 1895 and was head librarian from 1915 until his retirement in 1954. |
| Earl A. Morgan Branch | | 1916, 1926 | Greenville | Designed by architect Alfred S. Gottlieb. Formerly the Greenville Branch renamed for Jersey Journal journalist in 2019. Houses the Afro-American Historical and Cultural Society Museum |
| Lafayette Branch | | 1924 | Communipaw-Lafayette | |
| Pavonia Branch | | 1924–1970, 1989 | Hamilton Park | Named after the 1630 European settlement of Jersey City, Pavonia. The library's original building was demolished in 1971, after which it was located in a module building which was sporadically open until established at renovated historic building. |
| Marion Branch | | 1930 | Marion Section | |
| Glenn D. Cunningham Branch | | 1954, 2004 | Jackson Hill | The Claremont Branch was a storefront library opened February 11, 1954, at the corner of Claremont and Ocean. It succumbed to fire in 1982(~), after which a new facility was created at 291 MLK Drive. It was replaced with new building named for Mayor Glenn D. Cunningham |
| Five Corners Branch | | 1962 | Five Corners | |
| West Bergen Branch | | 1971, 1988, 2019 | West Side | Originally located at 503 West Side Avenue, it relocated in 1988 to 476 West Side Avenue and underwent renovations in 2015. In 2019, the West Bergen Branch moved to the ground floor of a newly constructed apartment building at 546 West Side Avenue. |
| Communipaw Branch | | 2024 | Communipaw-Lafayette | Located on the ground floor of an apartment building at 295 Johnston Avenue. It acts as the central hub for innovation in the library system with a focus on STEAM education |

== Former branches ==
| Name | Image | Year (established, built) | Neighborhood | Notes |
|---|---|---|---|---|
| Biblioteca Criolla | | 1972–2010 | Newark Avenue; Downtown | Consolidated into Main Library |
| Pearsall Branch | | 1982–2010 | Greenville | Located in what had once been the Grace Episcopal Church Sunday School at Ocean and Pearsall; closed due budget cuts, low usership, and state of disrepair. |

== Hudson County libraries ==
- Bayonne Public Library
- Hoboken Public Library
- Kearny Public Library
- Weehawken Public Library
