= Dr. Leonard J. Gordon Park =

Park in Jersey City, New Jersey

Coordinates: 40.745727°N 74.057934°W

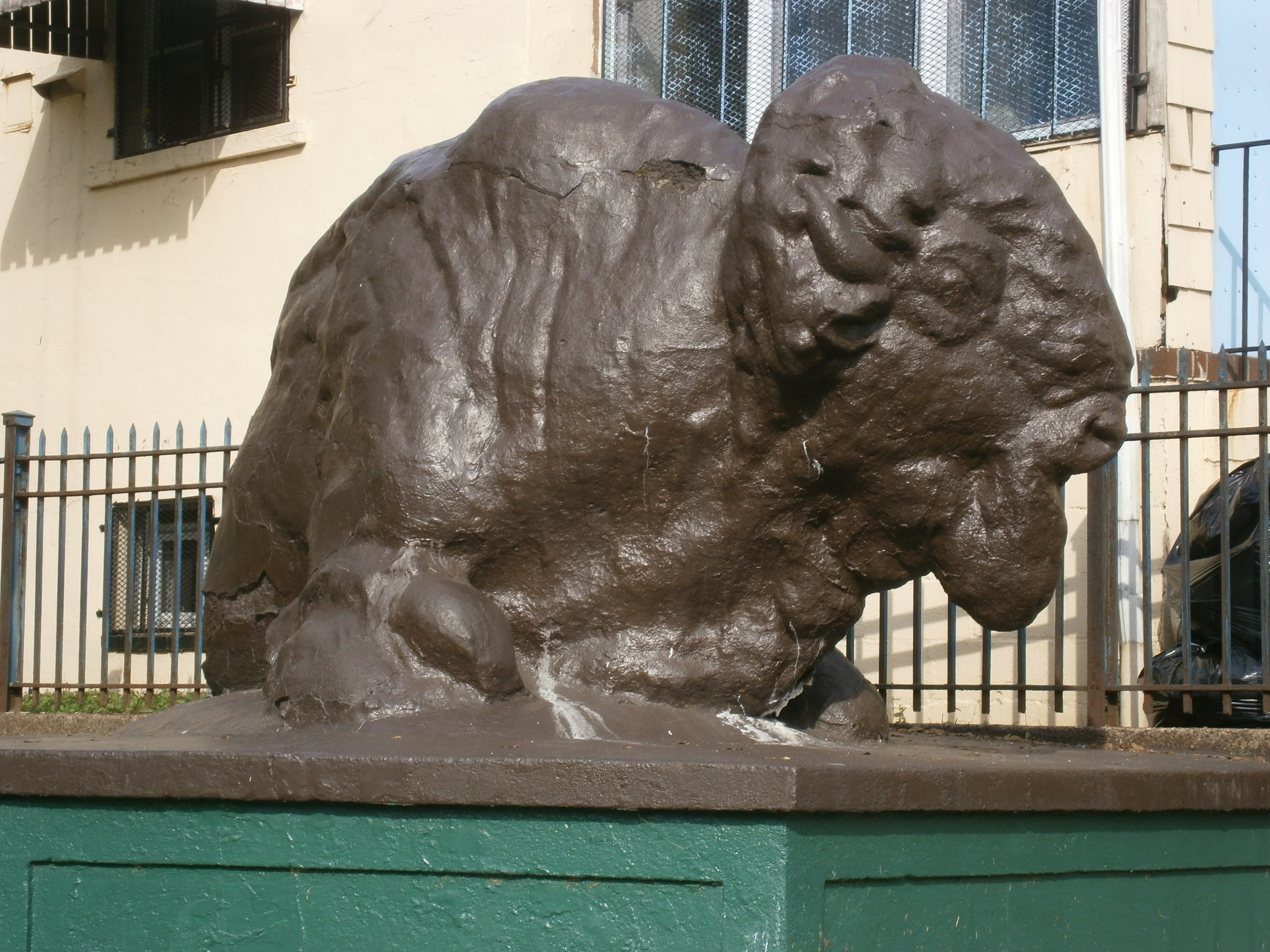
Bison statue in the park

Dr. Leonard J. Gordon Park is a municipal park located on Kennedy Boulevard at the edge of the Western Slope in the Heights of Jersey City, New Jersey. It encompasses 5.7 acres (2.3 ha).

== History ==
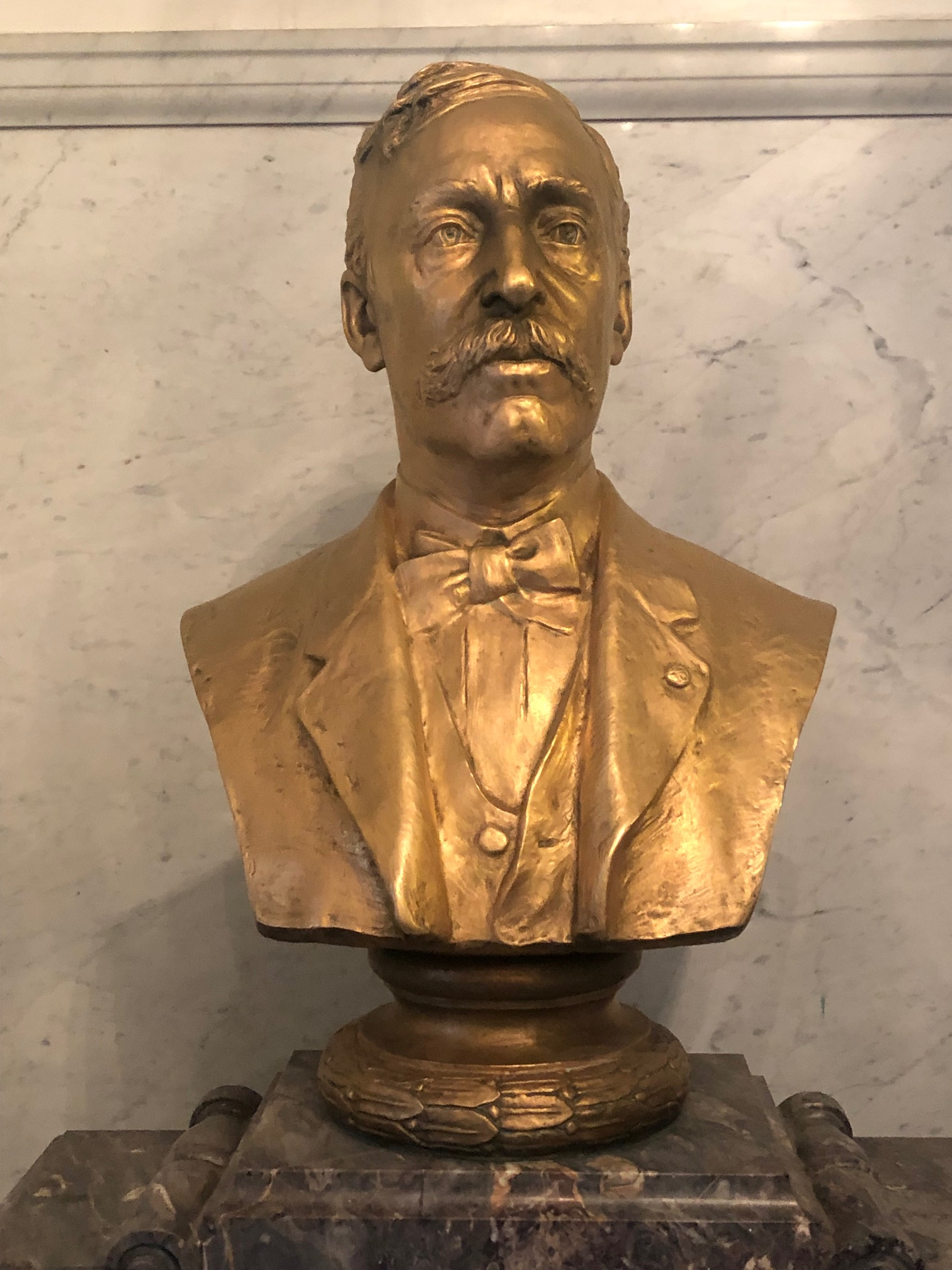
Bust of Dr. Leonard J. Gordon in Jersey City Public Library

The park was developed during the City Beautiful movement of the 1890s to 1900s. The Jersey City Charter Company owned the wooded hillside on the western slope of the Hudson Palisades and sold it to Jersey City for $46,000 on September 19, 1907. The park was designed by landscape architect John T. Withers, who incorporated many of the extant boulders and terrain features into his design. Wither, who had been appointed by Mayor H. Otto Wittpenn as the municipal landscaper, also designed Bayside Park in Greenville.

It is named in honor of civic leader Dr. Leonard James Gordon (1844–1905). A bust of Gordon can be found in the Jersey City Free Public Library, which he was instrumental in founding.

== Statues ==
Buffalo and Bears are larger-than-life stone statues by sculptor Solon Hannibal Borglum (1868–1922), who spent his early life on the plains of Utah and Nebraska.

A World War I memorial was placed in the park by the Hudson City Soldiers and Sailors Welfare League and dedicated on November 9, 1930. The statue of a doughboy is a variation of many found across the country.

== See also ==
- List of public art in Jersey City, New Jersey
- Hudson County Park System
