= Priscila De Carvalho =

Brazilian-American contemporary artist

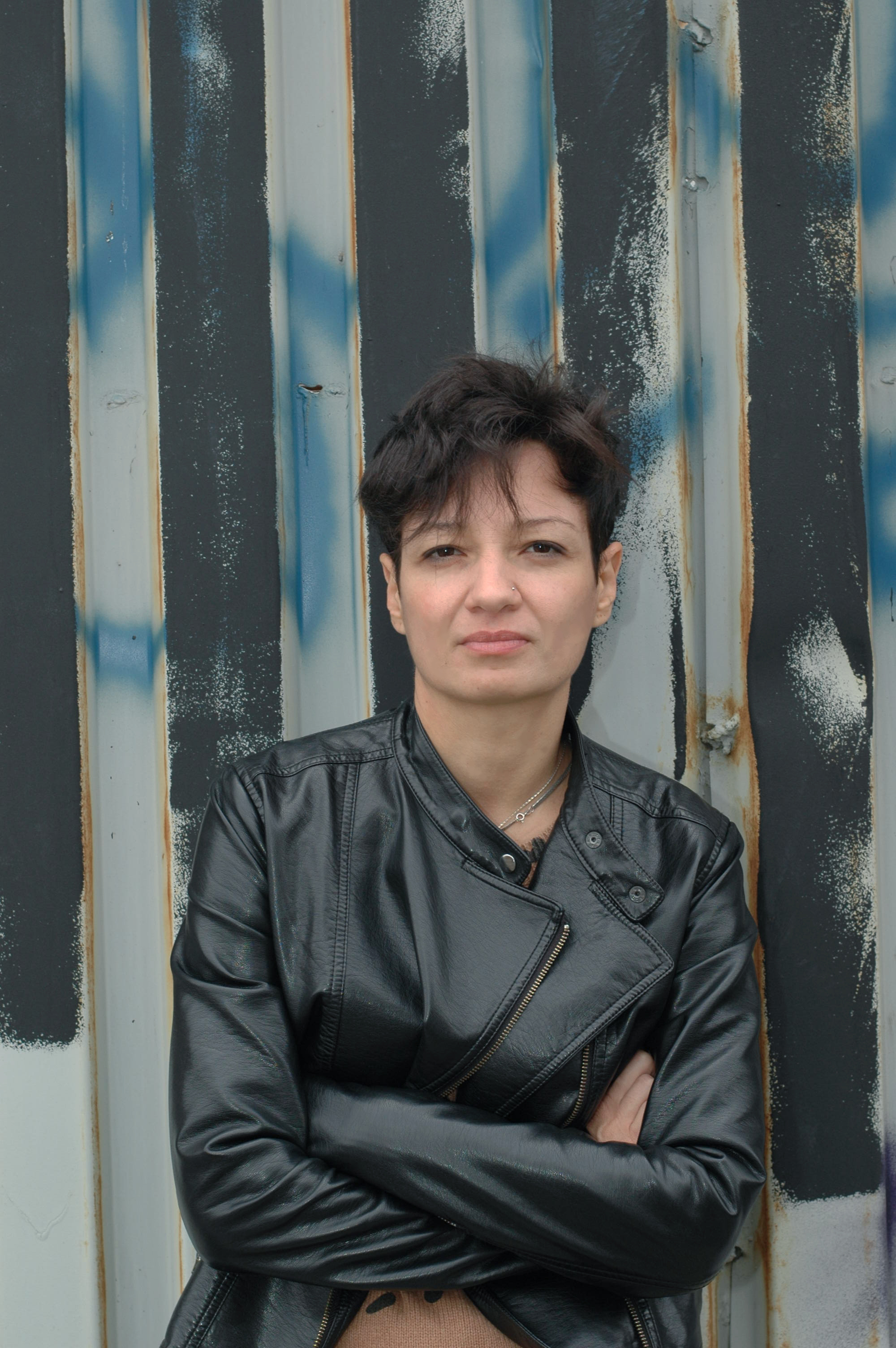
- Priscila De Carvalho by Asta Jonytyte
- Born: 1976 (age 49–50); Curitiba, Brazil
- Known for: Visual art, public art
- Awards: The Pollock-Krasner Foundation (2008)

Priscila De Carvalho (born 1975) is a Brazilian-born American contemporary artist who is known for paintings, sculptures, murals, site-specific art installations, and permanent public art.

== Early life and career ==
De Carvalho was born in Curitiba, Brazil in 1975. At the age of nine years old, she started composing small photo-realistic drawings influenced by cartoons, comics and fashion magazines. De Carvalho moved to San Francisco, California in the 1990s.

She has traveled extensively and lived in different cities including Tokyo, Berlin, and New York City, where she has been active as an artist since 2004. During this time, De Carvalho has been engaged in her studio practice and involved in several exhibitions throughout the U.S., Europe, Latin America, and Southeast Asia. Among many professional accomplishments are her Pollock-Krasner Foundation Award, Sculpture Space residency, Aljira Emerge 10 fellowship, Lower East Side Printshop exhibit, the Bronx Museum of the Arts' Artist in the Marketplace, and Workspace Artist residency at the Jamaica Center for the Arts and Learning Gallery. She made her first solo exhibition debut with Passageways in the Jersey City Museum, opening March 19, 2009.

== Work ==
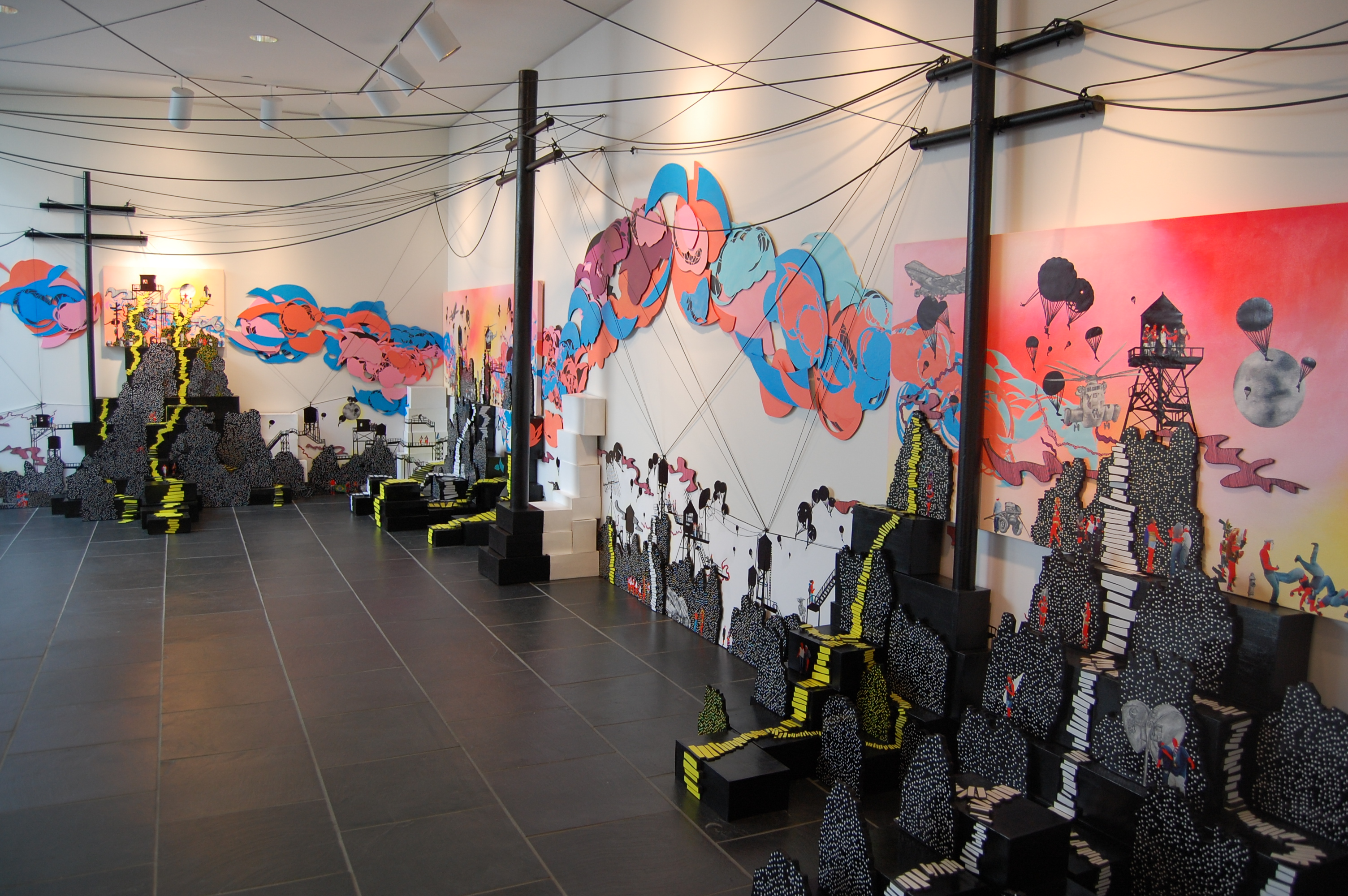
De Carvalho's solo exhibition debut, Passageways, at the Jersey City Museum (2009)

A recurring theme in De Carvalho's work is the passage of time and its effect on cultures. She compares the environment and human civilization in a way to make viewers question their relationship with both and thus, define what they expect from their culture and themselves. De Carvalho mixes influences of Pop Art and Spanish Informalism to create works that draw attention to the strange beauty of unbridled urbanization and pay reverence to architecture as an art form. Her installation art and murals often include paintings with augmented surfaces, which encourage the spectator to engage with the art as a three-dimensional subject, sometimes by expanding the images into interactive landscapes.

De Carvalho's work has been exhibited by the Brooklyn Bridge Park (New York, USA), The Bronx Museum of the Arts (New York, USA), Socrates Sculpture Park (New York, USA), the Basque Museum-Center of Contemporary Art (Vitoria-Gasteiz, Spain), Deutsche Bank (New York, USA), the Grand Palais (Paris, France), the Nepal Art Council in (Kathmandu, Nepal), The Museum of Contemporary African Diasporan Arts (New York, USA), and The Jersey City Museum (Jersey City, USA). She was also a celebrated participant in El Museo's Sixth Biennial in New York City, The First AIM Biennial at The Bronx Museum of the Arts, and The Kathmandu International Triennial in Nepal, where she represented her native nation of Brazil.

She has been commissioned for large-scale permanent public art projects by the MTA Arts & Design and the department of education in New York. In collaboration with School Construction Authority, in 2019 De Carvalho began creating permanent public artwork for the SBS Woodhaven median stations commissioned by New York City's department of cultural affairs’ "Percent for Arts Program" as well as her largest and most ambitious sculptural work to date for the Valley Metro Rail System in Phoenix, Arizona.

== Publications ==
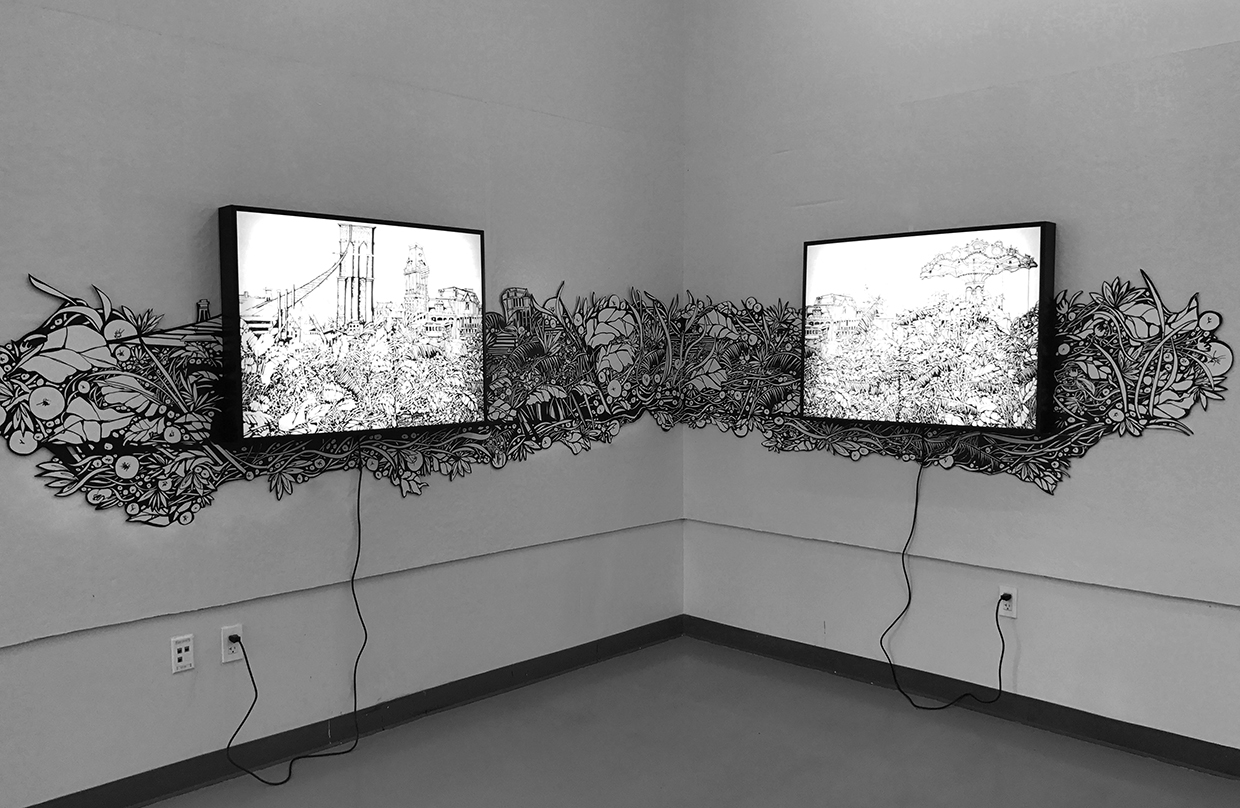
De Carvalho's Before Now at the Brooklyn Bridge Park (2017)

Book chapters and articles related to De Carvalho:

- New York's Underground Art Museum MTA Arts and Design, Written by Sandra Bloodworth, William Ayres, foreword by Stanley Tucci, Preface by Thomas F. Prendergast by The Monacelli Press, 2014
- 2013 Info En Punto: Nueva obra de Priscila de Carvalho para el programa Grey Flag de Artium, May 7, 2014
- El Pais: Un paisaje urbano de Priscila de Carvalho sobre la fachada, May 7, 2013
- Tsering, Dolker. Nepali Times. Koloring Kathmandu. Page # 650 April 5, 2013
- The Katmandu Post. January at Sattya January 1, 2013
- Hallie, Sekoff. The Huffington Post ArtRio 2012. “The Second Annual Fair Reflects Brazil's Growing Presence In The Contemporary Art World”, September 4, 2012
- Kurchi, Dasgupta. Hyperallergic. “Painting is Alive and Kicking at the Kathmandu International Art Festival", December 20, 2012
- Jessica, Allen. CBS New York, 5 NYC Street Art Murals To See Right Now, July 2, 2012
- Jaime, Rojo. The Huffington Post: "What's New in Bushwick: A Quick Street Art Survey", June 6, 2012
- Holland, Cotter. “The New York Times: Artists Whose Vitality Flows From the Streets”, June 16, 2011
- Amir, H. Fallah. Beautiful Decay Magazine: ”Priscila's Majestic Brazil”, October 28, 2011
- Eduardo, Graça. O GLOBO: ”Crise econômica e política chamam a atenção em retrospectiva de artistas contemporâneos no Museo del Barrio, em Nova York", Rio de Janeiro, June 24, 2011
- Allison, Meier. Hyperallergic: Bronx Calling: The First AIM Biennial, Review, July 18, 2011
- Gisele, Regatao. Culture WNYC: "Pickles, Turntables and Graffiti at El Museo del Barrio's 'Bienal' of Latino Art”, June 14, 2011
- Marisol, Nieves. Catalogue. “Taking AIM!: The Business of Being an Artist Today", Page 285, October 3, 2011
- Art Paris, Catalogue "Out of Nothing", Paris, France, March 5, 2010
- Priscila De Carvalho at Praxis. Remezcla. New York, NY, February, 2010
- Benjamin, Genocchio. The New York Times: "A Decade of Emergence", Review, August 28, 2009
- Art Forum, Pollock and Krasner Grant Foundation Grants for 2009/2008 announced, September 25, 2009
- Deutsche Bank Art Mag, "Making It", New York, NY, 2009

== Selected exhibitions ==
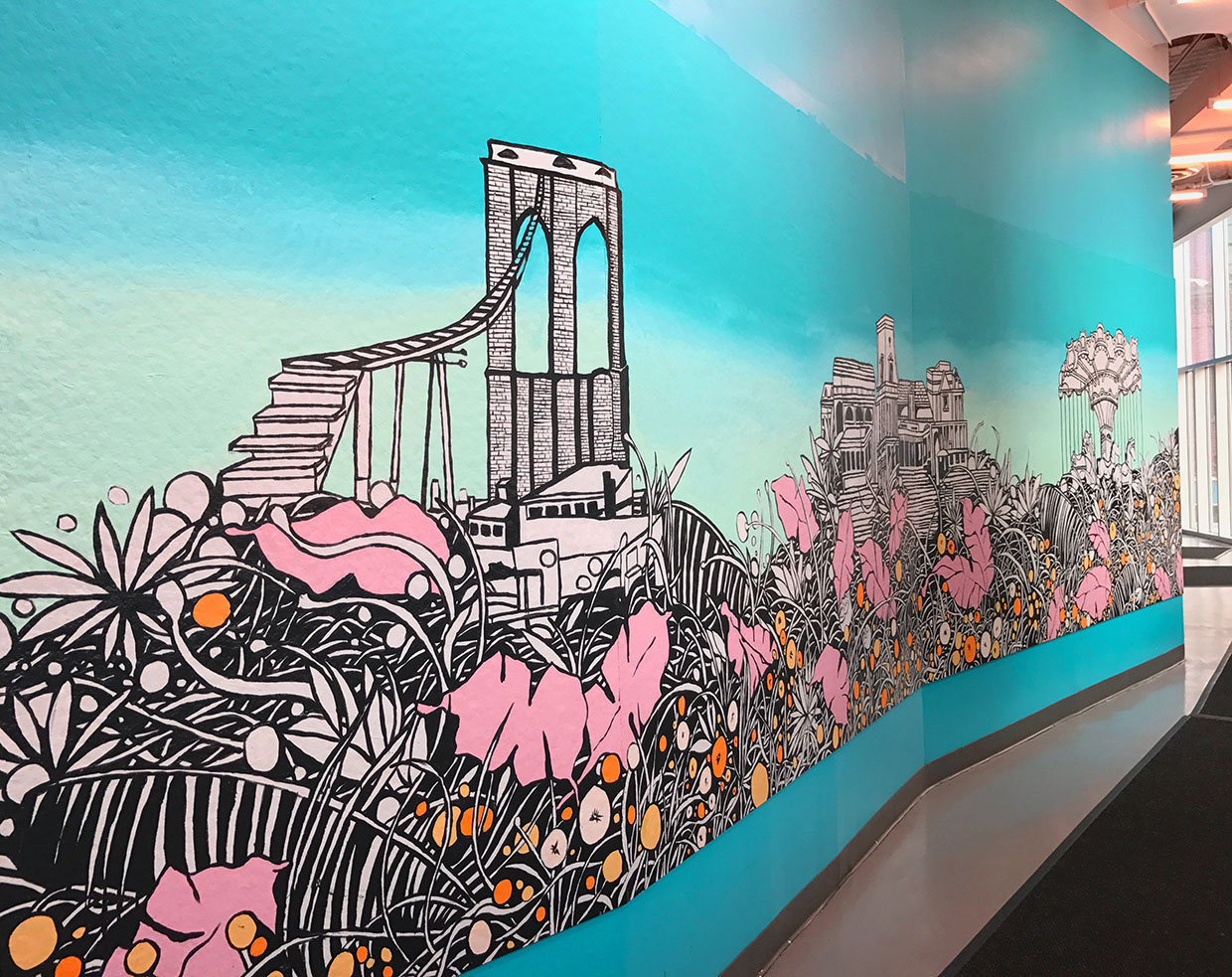
De Carvalho's Jane's Carousel at the Brooklyn Bridge Park (2017)

- “Before Now”, Brooklyn Bridge Park, Brooklyn, New York, 2017
- “Bronx: Heart, Homeland” MTA for the Arts and Design, Castle Hill, subway station, NY, 2015
- "Grey Flag" Artium- Basque Museum of Contemporary Art, Vitoria, Spain, 2013
- “Earth, Body, Mind” Nepal Art Council, Second Kathmandu International Festival, 2012
- "Vista" Socrates Sculpture Park, Long Island City, NY, 2011
- “The (S) Files”, El Barrio Museum Biennial, El Museo del Barrio, New York, NY, 2011
- AIM, Bronx Museum Biennial, The Bronx Museum of the Arts, Bronx, NY, 2011
- "Ain't I a woman” Mocada - Museum of Contemporary African Diaspora Arts, Brooklyn, NY, 2010
- ”Art Paris" The Grand Palais Art Fair, 64bs Gallerie, Paris, France, 2010
- “Making It" Deutsche Bank Gallery, New York, NY, 2009
