= White Rose Hamburgers =

Coordinates: 40.501098°N 74.415439°W

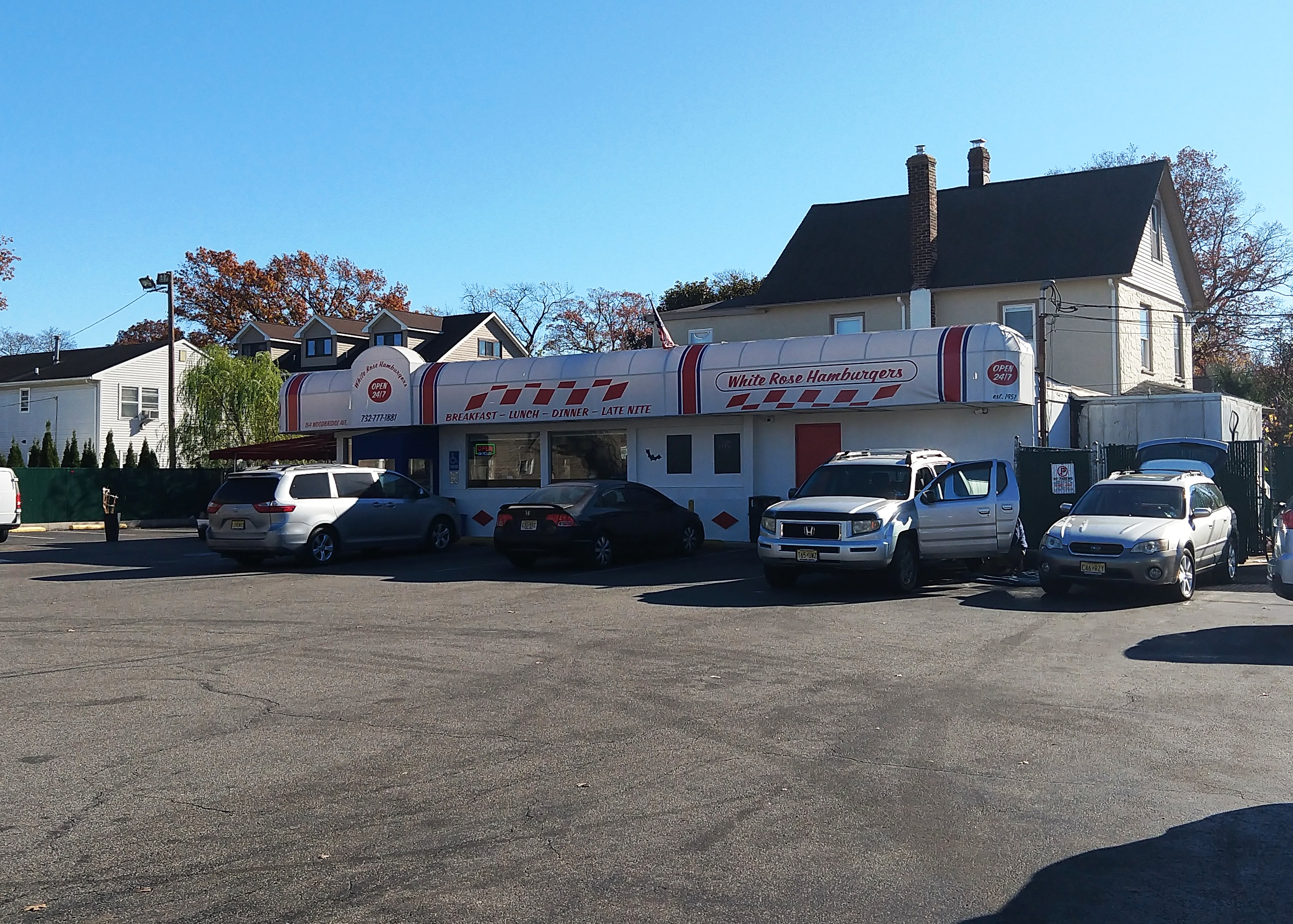
- Original Highland Park restaurant
- Interactive map of White Rose Hamburgers

Restaurant information
- Food type: North American cuisine
- Dress code: Casual
- Location: 154 Woodbridge Avenue, Highland Park, New Jersey, 08904, United States
- Other locations: 1301 E. Elizabeth Avenue, Linden, New Jersey 07036; 201 East 1st Avenue, Roselle, New Jersey 07203
- Website: www.wrburgers.com

White Rose Hamburgers (also known as White Rose System and White Rose Diner) started as a diner franchise located in Highland Park, New Jersey, with a second location in Linden, New Jersey and a third location in Roselle, New Jersey.

== Overview ==
White Rose took the name "White" to emphasize clean meat. Many other restaurants have added the name "White" in their title based on this. In 2013, White Rose opened a location in New Brunswick, New Jersey.

White Rose has daily deliveries of bread and meat. Orders are processed quickly in a streamlined process which has remained the same for decades.

== Recognition ==
The restaurants are now independently owned, and the White Rose Diner in Linden, New Jersey was ranked on America's best burgers list along with White Manna, a pair of New Jersey hamburger restaurants.

== See also ==
- Bobby's Burger Palace
