= Western Slope, Jersey City =

Populated place in Hudson County, New Jersey, US

Coordinates: 40.7474°N 74.0598°W

White Mana in Western Slope

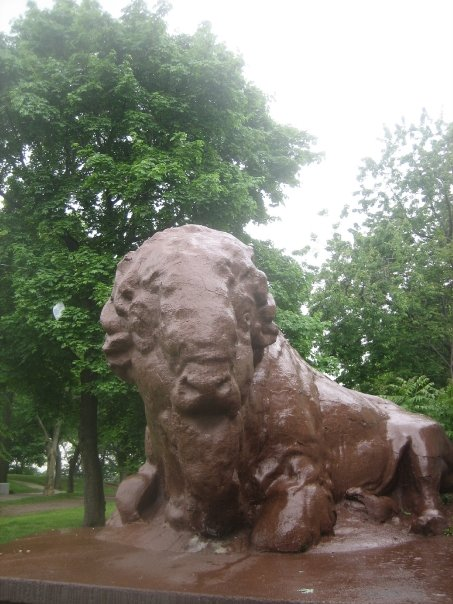
Leonard Gordon Park

Western Slope is a neighborhood in The Heights, Jersey City, New Jersey on the cuesta, or gradual decline, of the western side of the New Jersey Palisades between The Boulevard and Tonnele Avenue.

Its southern border is generally considered to be Beach Street near The Divided Highway and ramp leading to Tonnelle Circle. Its northern border is near Transfer Station, the district of Hudson County, New Jersey where Secaucus Road, Kennedy Boulevard, and Paterson Plank Road, intersect and where the borders of Jersey City Heights, North Bergen, New Jersey, and Union City, New Jersey meet at one point. Some streets of Western Slope keep their names as they cross over the city line into North Bergen.

From the Tonnelle Avenue at Route 139, Tonnelle Avenue through Western Slope is also known as U.S. Route 1/9 between the Holland and Lincoln tunnels, and is dotted with motels, gas stations, and the legendary, old-school White Manna diner. Some effects from erosion resulting from continued development can be seen along the eastern side of Tonnelle Avenue. The area along Tonnelle Avenue is industrial and commercial, whereas the blocks rising to the east are residential.

Leonard Gordon Park at Manhattan Avenue is a neighborhood park and site of a larger-than-life 1907 sculpture referred to as Buffalo and Bears by Solon Hannibal Borglum.

Sparrow Hill is a six- block neighborhood stretch of Liberty Avenue between Spruce Street and Manhattan Avenue.
