= Bounty (brand) =

American brand of paper towel

- Product type: Paper towel
- Current owner: Procter & Gamble
- Country: United States
- Introduced: 1965; 61 years ago
- Tagline: The quicker picker-upper; The stronger soaker-upper
- Website: www.bountytowels.com

Bounty is an American brand of paper towel that is manufactured by Procter & Gamble (P&G) in the United States, introduced in 1965.

== History ==
The Bounty brand name and its tag line "the quicker picker-upper!" came about through the acquisition of Charmin in 1957 by Procter & Gamble (P&G), becoming its first consumer-paper products business. Charmin Towels was the successful predecessor to Bounty, which led to P&G's strategic investment in research and development of the innovative Bounty. While most paper towels were being marketed promoting their strength or softness, P&G found consumers primarily preferred absorbency. With this new idea for marketing, Bounty replaced Charmin towels in 1965, and introduced a new 2-ply towel which was thicker, softer, and more absorbent than anything else on the market.

In 1982, P&G Senior Inventor Paul Trokhan developed a proprietary technology that enhanced Bounty's absorbency by creating micro-regions within the towel focused on different attributes like strength and softness.

== Advertising ==
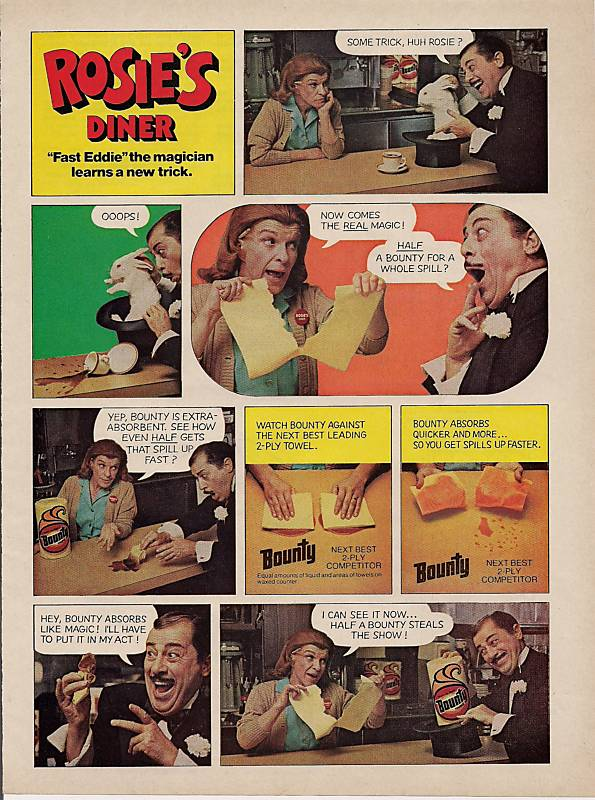
Nancy Walker as Rosie in a 1977 print ad for Bounty (pictured with actor Vito Scotti).

From the 1960s to the 1990s, veteran character actress Nancy Walker appeared in a long-running series of popular commercials in the US, in which Walker played Rosie, a waitress in a diner, who used Bounty to clean up spills made by the diner's patrons and demonstrating its better absorption, compared to other brands. The original tag-line, "the quick picker-upper", was soon changed to "the quicker picker-upper", which became a common catchphrase (with variations) long after Walker ceased appearing in Bounty ads.

In the UK, they had a campaign featuring 2 large, stubbly men wearing wigs and dresses referred to as Brenda and Audrey performing household tasks that require a paper towel and comparing them to other products. Later, the adverts featured a man known as Juan Sheet, a pun on "one sheet", using the slogan "one sheet does Plenty" (Plenty being the name of the product in the UK at the time.)

== Product ==
Consumer Reports reported (2014) the best paper towel was Bounty DuraTowel, followed by the next two on the list also being Bounty products.

In 1998, Bounty started selling napkins.

== Sale of British rights ==
In 2007, P&G sold its European business that also produced "Bounty" to SCA (now Essity), and the product was then rebranded to Plenty in the UK.

== In popular culture ==
In Season 9 Episode 1 (Road Rage) of the American documentary series Forensic Files, a homicide case was solved with forensic evidence that included Bounty paper towels.
