= Transportation in New York City =

- A geographically accurate representation of New York City train lines operated by the Metropolitan Transportation Authority

Overview
- Owner: Metropolitan Transportation Authority, Port Authority of New York and New Jersey, State of New Jersey, other local governments
- Locale: New York City metropolitan area
- Transit type: Rapid transit, commuter rail, bus and bus rapid transit, light rail, people mover, aerial tramway, bicycle sharing system, taxicab
- Daily ridership: More than 10 million

Operation
- Operators: MTA, NJ Transit, Port Authority, NICE, Bee-Line

The transportation system of New York City is a network of complex infrastructural systems. New York City, being the most populous city in the United States, has a transportation system which includes a subway system that belongs to the 20 largest and busiest subway systems in the world; the world's first mechanically ventilated vehicular tunnel; and an aerial tramway. New York City is home to an extensive bus system in each of the five boroughs; citywide and Staten Island ferry systems; and numerous yellow taxis and boro taxis throughout the city. Private cars are less used compared to other cities in the rest of the United States.

The airport system of the New York City metropolitan area, which includes John F. Kennedy International Airport and LaGuardia Airport in Queens and Newark Liberty International Airport in North Jersey, Stewart Airport in Orange County, New York, and a few smaller facilities, is one of the largest in the world. The Port of New York and New Jersey, which includes the waterways of the New York City metropolitan area, is one of the busiest seaports in the United States.

There are three commuter rail systems, the PATH rapid transit system to New Jersey, and various ferries between Manhattan and New Jersey. Numerous separate bus systems operate to Westchester County, Nassau County, and New Jersey. For private vehicles, a system of expressways and parkways connects New York City with its suburbs.

== Background ==
=== History ===
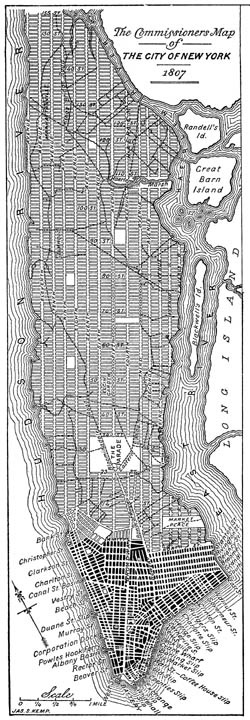
An 1807 grid plan of Manhattan

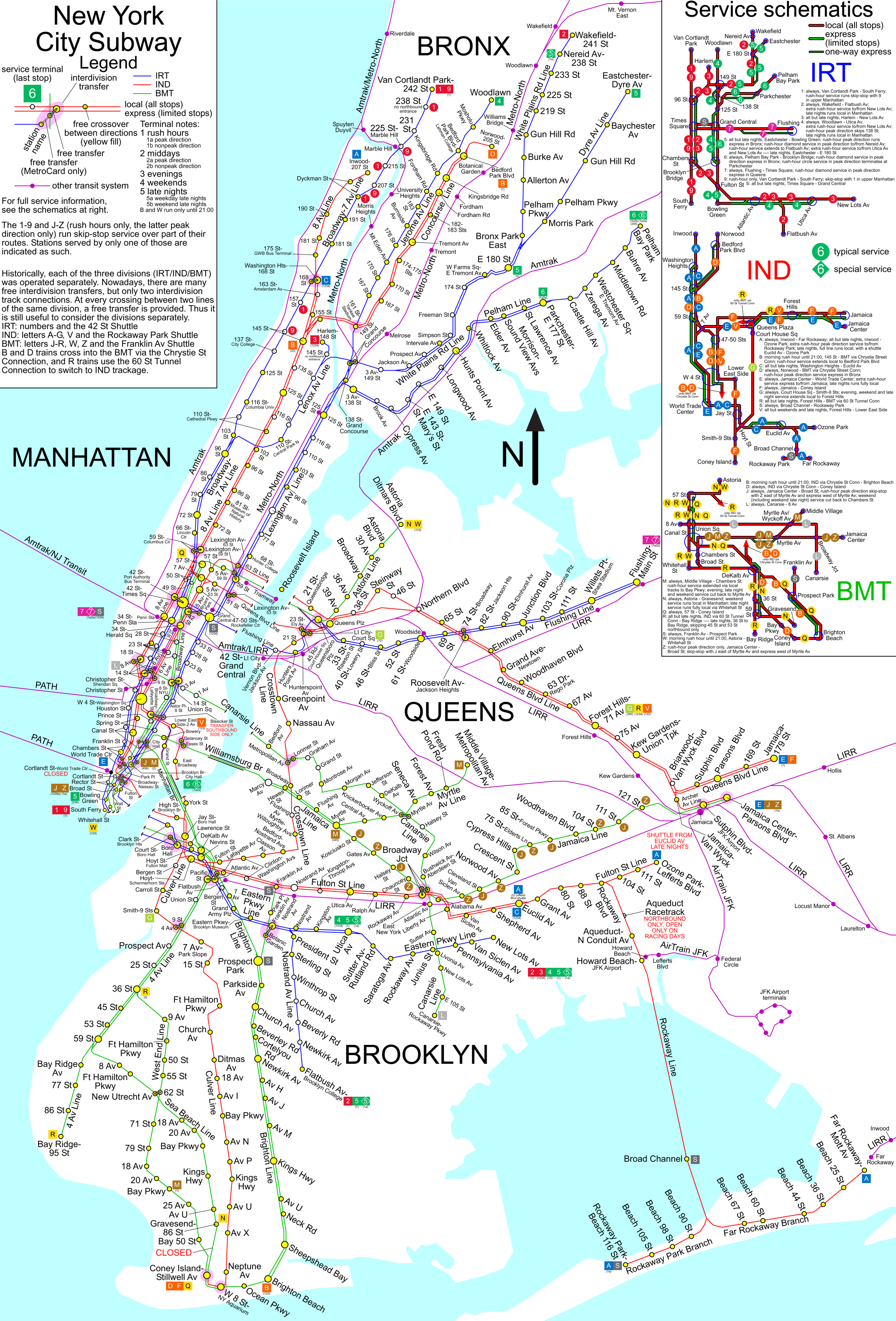
A 2004 map of New York City's passenger rail system

The history of New York City's transportation system began with the Dutch port of New Amsterdam. The port had maintained several roads; some were built atop former Lenape trails, others as "commuter" links to surrounding cities, and one was even paved by 1658 from orders of Petrus Stuyvesant, according to Burrow, et al. The 19th century brought changes to the format of the system's transport: the establishment of a Manhattan street grid through the Commissioners' Plan of 1811, as well as an unprecedented link between the then-separate cities of New York and Brooklyn via the Brooklyn Bridge, in 1883.

The Second Industrial Revolution fundamentally changed the city; the port infrastructure grew so rapidly following the 1825 completion of the Erie Canal that New York City became the most important connection between all of Europe and the interior of the United States. Elevated trains and subterranean transportation, known as 'El trains' and 'subways', were introduced between 1867 and 1904.

In 1904, the first subway line became operational. Practical private automobiles brought an additional change to the city by around 1930, notably the 1927 Holland Tunnel. With automobiles gaining importance, the later rise of Robert Moses proved essential to creating New York's modern road infrastructure. Moses was the architect of all 416 miles (669 km) of the parkway, many other important roads, and seven great bridges.

=== Mass transit use and car ownership ===
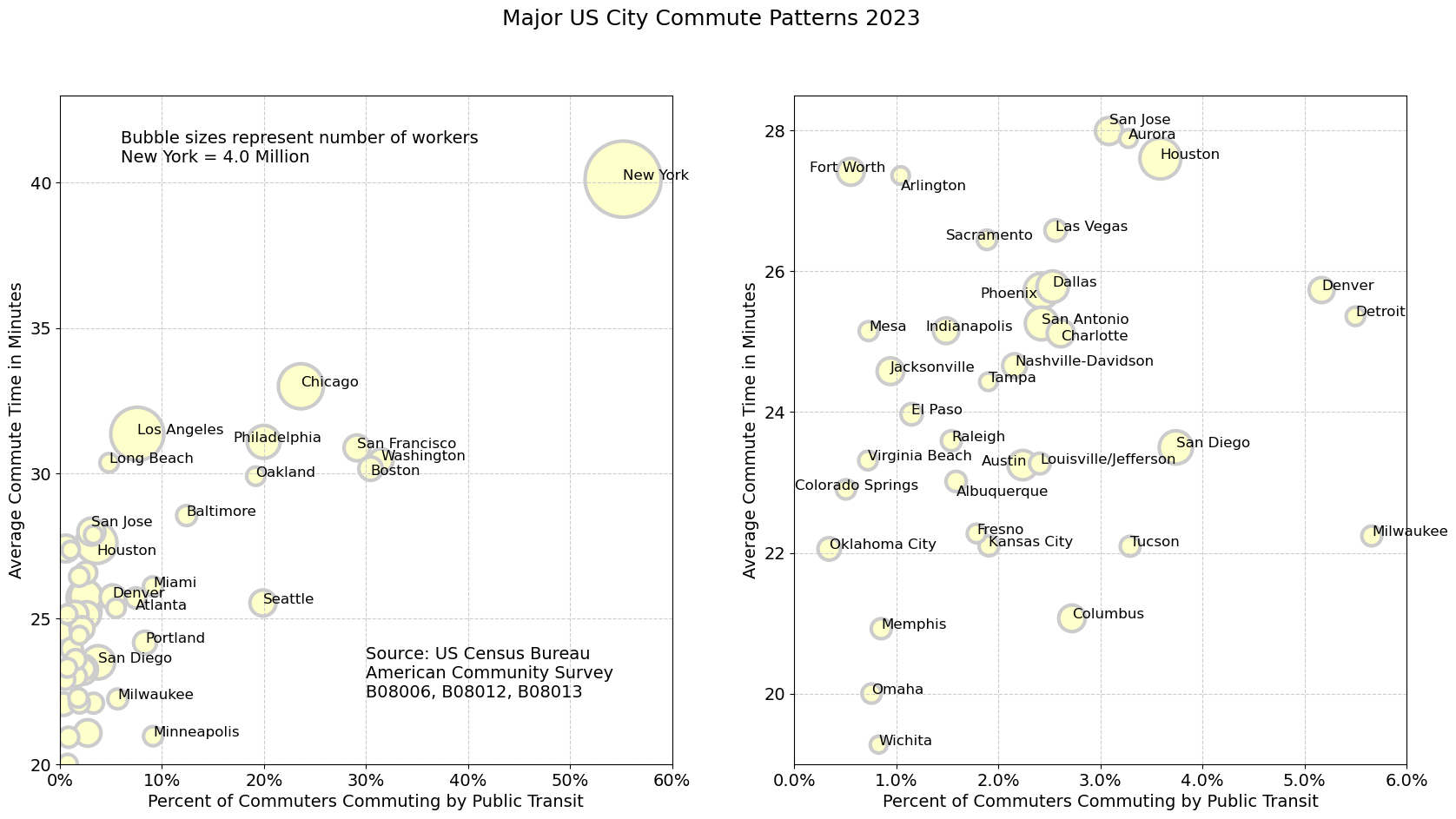
The percentage of workers using public transportation for their commute and the mean travel time for major cities in the United States, including New York City, as of 2023

New York City is distinguished from other U.S. cities for its low personal automobile ownership and its significant use of public transportation. New York City has, by far, the highest rate of public transportation use of any American city, with 55.6% of workers who commute getting to work by this means in 2023. About one in every three users of mass transit in the United States and two-thirds of the nation's rail riders live in New York City or its suburbs. However, New York City also has the longest mean travel time for commuters (42.5 minutes) among major U.S. cities.

New York is the only city in the United States where over half of all households do not own a car (Manhattan's non-ownership is even higher, around 75%; nationally, the rate is 8%). However, absolute figures for car ownership are still high when compared to other cities: in 2019, 55% of households were not car owners, indicating that 45% of households did own a car.

=== Environmental and social issues ===
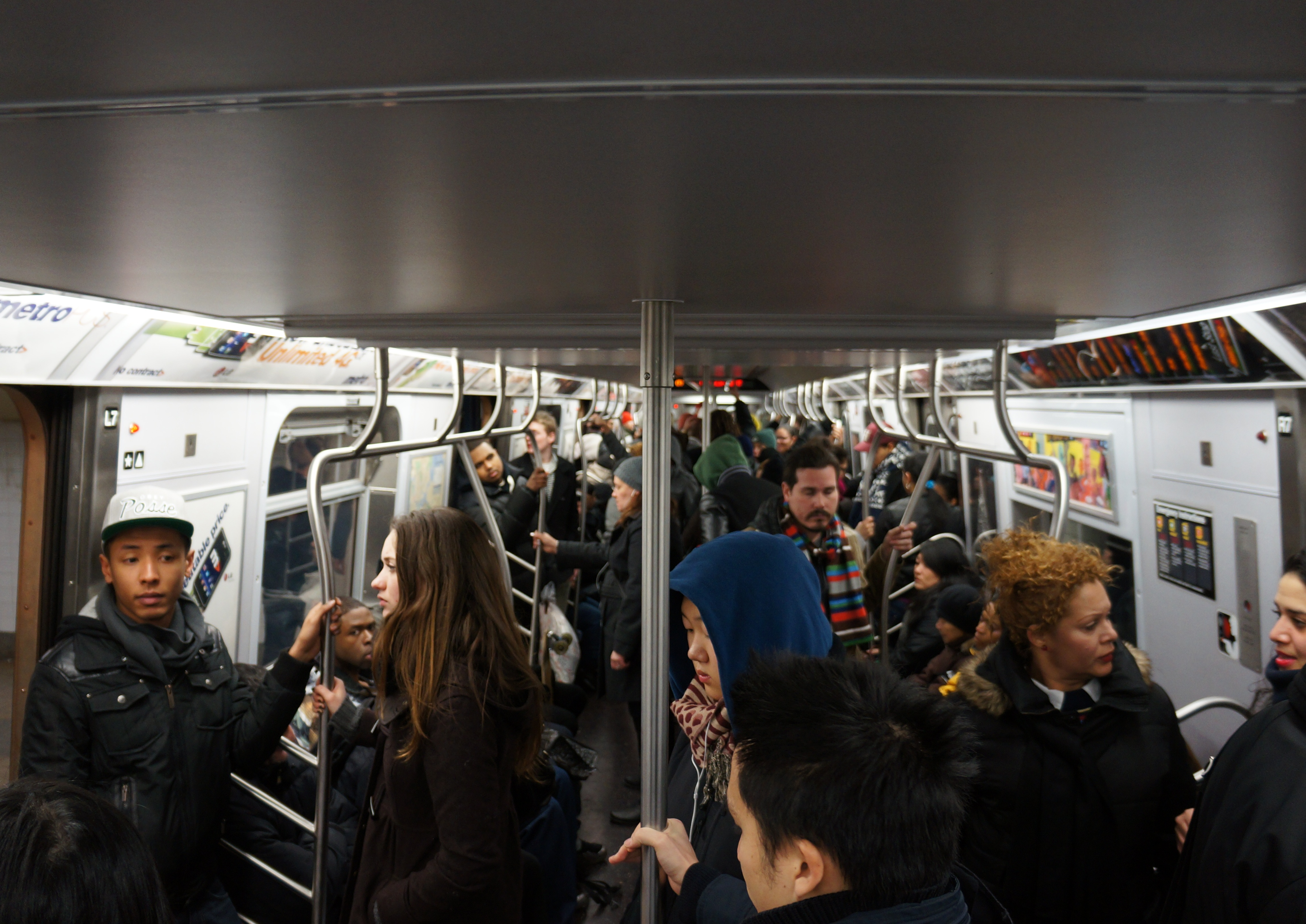
Crowds on an F subway train on a weekend afternoon

New York City's high rate of public transit use makes it one of the most energy-efficient cities in the United States. Gasoline consumption in the city today is at the rate of the national average in the 1920s. New York City's high rate of transit use saved 1.8 billion US gallons (6,800,000 m^{3}) of oil in 2006 and $4.6 billion in gasoline costs. New York saves half of all the oil saved by transit nationwide.

The reduction in oil consumption meant 11.8 million metric tons of carbon dioxide was kept out of the air. The New York City metro area was ranked by the Brookings Institution as the U.S. metro area with the lowest per-capita transportation-related carbon footprint and as the fourth lowest overall per-capita carbon footprint in 2005 among the 100 largest metro areas of the United States, outranked only by Honolulu, Los Angeles and Portland.

The city's transportation system, and the population density it makes possible, also have other effects. Scientists at Columbia University examined data from 13,102 adults in the city's five boroughs and identified correlations between New York's built environment and public health. New Yorkers residing in densely populated, pedestrian-friendly areas have significantly lower body mass index (BMI) levels compared to other New Yorkers. Three characteristics of the city environment—living in areas with mixed residential and commercial uses, living near bus and subway stops and living in population-dense areas—were found to be inversely associated with BMI levels.

Despite the energy efficiency that results from high transit use, the city's streets are generally seen as being dangerous to pedestrians and cyclists. As of 2019, there are on average 225,000 crashes, 61,000 injuries, and 200+ deaths due to automobiles every year in New York City. Approximately 75% of city street space is devoted to moving cars and trucks at speed and parking these vehicles, while the other 25% of the street is left for pedestrians, bikes, and store fronts.

=== Commuting ===
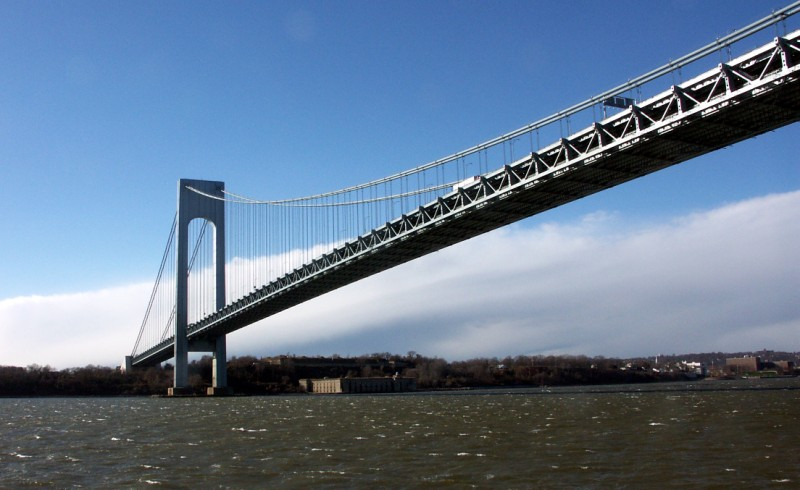
The Verrazzano–Narrows Bridge spans The Narrows, connecting Brooklyn and Staten Island.

Of all people who commuted to work in New York City in 2021, 32% use the subway, 30% drive alone, 12% take the bus, 10% walk to work, 4% travel by commuter rail, 5.6% carpool, 3.1% use a taxi, 1.7% ride their bicycle to work, and 0.4% travel by ferry. 54% of households in New York City do not own a car, and rely on public transportation.

While the car culture is predominant in most American cities, mass transit is comparatively more heavily used in New York City. The subway is a popular location for politicians to meet voters during elections and is also a major venue for musicians. Each week, more than 100 musicians and ensembles ranging from classical to Cajun, bluegrass, African, South American and jazz genres, give over 150 New York City Transit sanctioned performances under the Music Under New York program, a few dozen of which are located throughout the subway system.

3.7 million people were employed in New York City; Manhattan is the main employment center with 56% of all jobs. Of those working in Manhattan, 30% commute from within Manhattan, while 17% come from Queens, 16% from Brooklyn, 8% from the Bronx, and 2.5% from Staten Island. Another 4.5% commute to Manhattan from Nassau County and 2% from Suffolk County on Long Island, while 4% commute from Westchester County. 5% commute from Bergen and Hudson counties in New Jersey. Some commuters come from Fairfield County in Connecticut. Some New Yorkers reverse commute to the suburbs: 3% travel to Nassau County, 1.5% to Westchester County, 0.7% to Hudson County, 0.6% to Bergen County, 0.5% to Suffolk County, and smaller percentages to other places in the metropolitan area.

On average, New Yorkers spend 1 hour and 27 minutes per weekday commuting with public transit. Of these, 31% ride for more than 2 hours every day. The average amount of time people wait at a stop or station for public transit is 15 minutes, but 23% of riders wait for an average of over 20 minutes. The average distance people usually ride in a single trip with public transit is 9.5 kilometres (5.9 mi).

=== Ridership ===
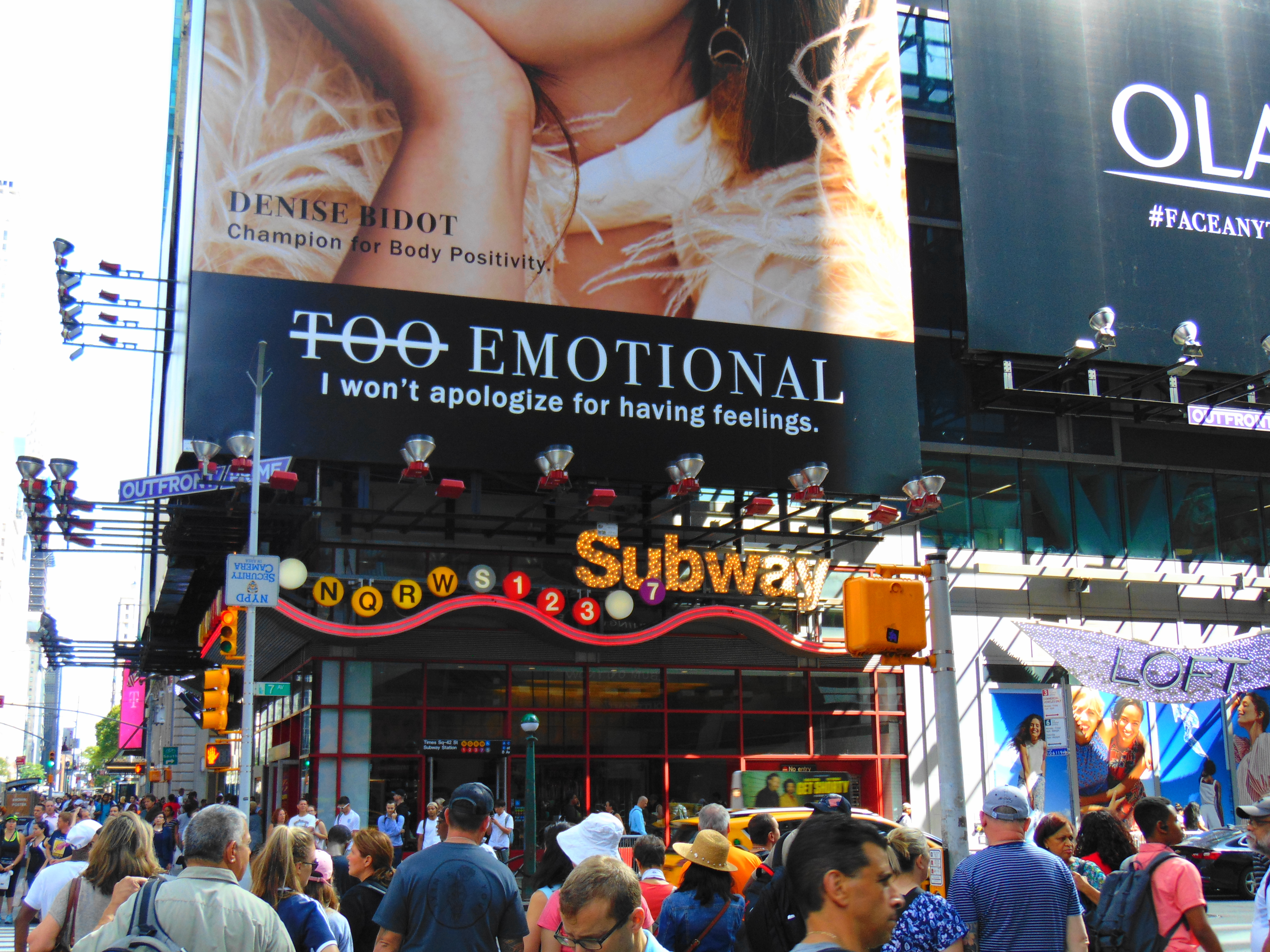
The entrance to the Times Square–42nd Street station station on 7th Avenue

The Metropolitan Transportation Authority (MTA) operates most of New York City's transit systems. Using census data, the MTA reported in August 2006 that ridership on its buses, subways and commuter trains in recent years has grown faster than population growth, indicating that more New Yorkers are choosing to use mass transit, despite poor service in some areas of New York City. With dramatic increases in fuel prices in 2008, as well as increased tourism and residential growth, ridership on buses and subways grew 3.1% up to about 2.37 billion trips a year compared to 2007. This is the highest ridership since 1965.

In 2013, ridership on the New York City Subway was 1.7 billion, the highest ridership since 1946, despite Hurricane Sandy-related subway closures. Ridership in city buses was 803 million.

=== Transit culture ===
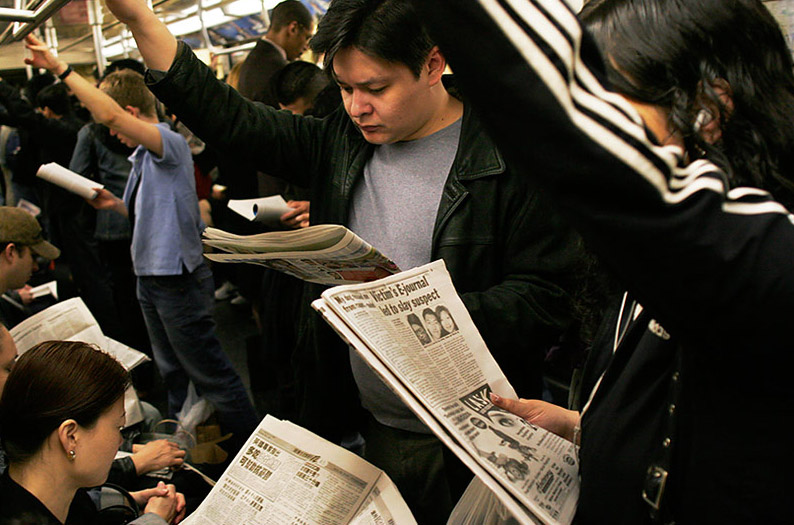
New York City Subway passengers in May 2005

The system is a major venue for commerce, entertainment, and political activism. Much of the city, excluding Staten Island, relies on the subway, which is open 24 hours a day, as its main source of transportation. Campaigning at subway stations is a staple of New York elections akin to candidate appearances at small town diners during presidential campaigns in the rest of the country. Each week, more than 100 musicians and ensembles with a broad ranging of genres, including classical, bluegrass, African, South American, and jazz, give over 150 performances sanctioned by New York City Transit at 25 locations throughout the subway system, many under the Music Under New York program. There are many more who are unauthorized performers called buskers, who range from professionals putting on an impromptu show to panhandlers seeking donations by way of performance.

The subways of New York have been venues for beauty pageants and guerrilla theater. The MTA's annual Miss Subways contest ran from 1941 to 1976 and again in 2004 under the revised name "Ms. Subways".

The subways and commuter rail systems also have some artworks in their stations, commissioned under the MTA Arts & Design umbrella.

== Transit systems ==
=== Rail ===
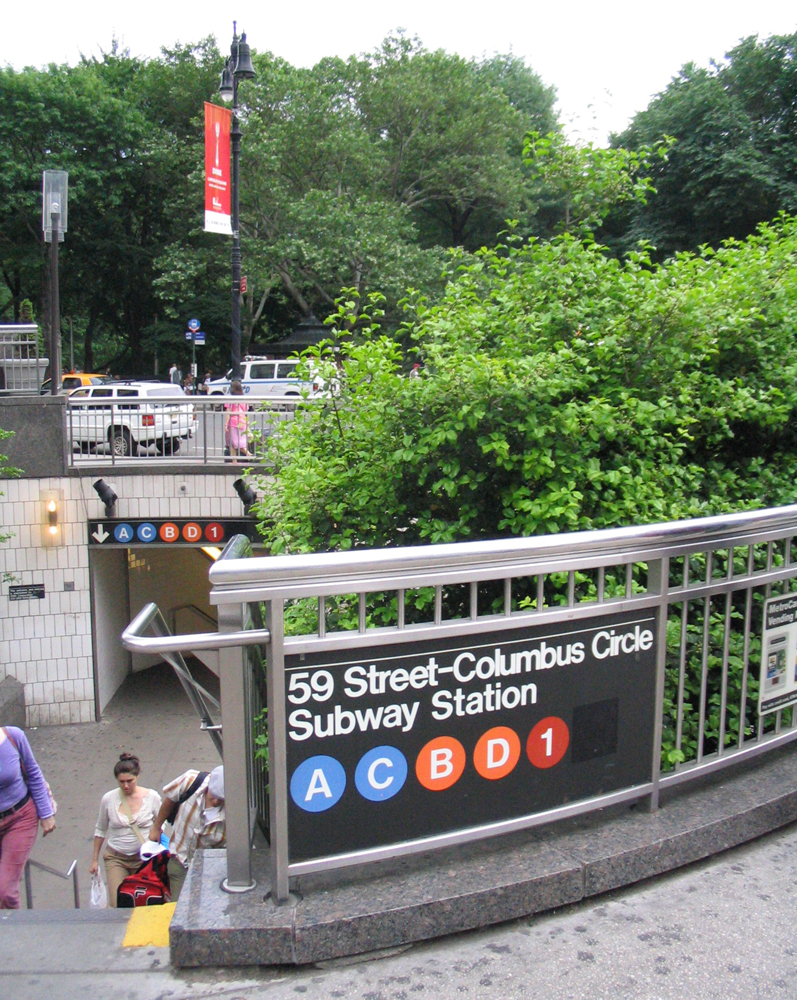
The entrance to the 59th Street–Columbus Circle station at Columbus Circle in Manhattan

The primary mode of transportation in New York City is rail. Only 6% of shopping trips in Manhattan involve the use of a car. The city's public transportation network is the most extensive and among the oldest in North America. Responsibility for managing the various components of the system falls to several government agencies. The largest and most important is the Metropolitan Transportation Authority (MTA), a public benefit corporation in New York state, which runs two of the city's three rapid transit systems, most of its buses, and two of its three commuter rail networks. Despite the extensive coverage, there are still transit deserts primarily in eastern Queens and Staten Island.

Ridership in the city increased 36% to 2.2 billion annual riders from 1995 to 2005, far outpacing population growth. Average weekday subway ridership was 5.076 million in September 2006, while combined subway and bus ridership on an average weekday that month was 7.61 million.

==== Rapid transit systems ====
===== MTA =====
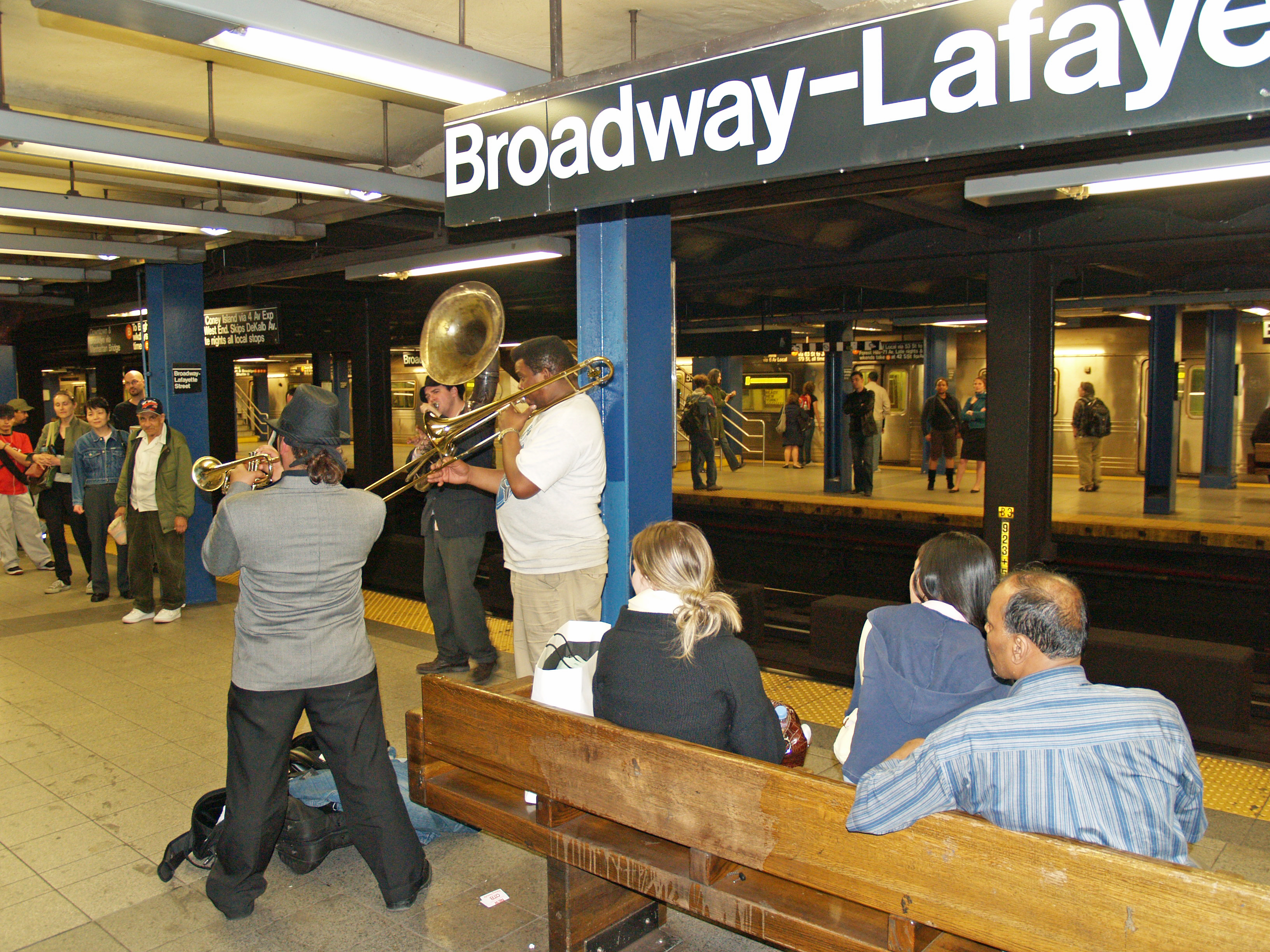
The New York City Subway's Broadway – Lafayette Station on the IND Sixth Avenue Line

The New York City Subway is the metro system with the world's highest number of stations (423, or 472 if stations connected by transfers are counted multiple times), among the 20 largest when measured by system length, and among the 20 busiest rapid transit rail systems. The subway served 1,281,883,362 linked transit passenger trips in 2025. It is the second-oldest subway system in the United States after the rapid transit system in Boston. In 2002, an average 4.8 million passengers used the subway each weekday. During one day in September 2005, 7.5 million daily riders set a record for ridership. In 2013, the subway delivered over 1.71 billion rides, averaging approximately 5.5 million rides on weekdays, about 3.2 million rides on Saturdays, and about 2.6 million rides on Sundays.

Ridership consistently increased in the early 21st century, partly because of the subway's energy efficiency. Life in New York City is so dependent on the subway that the city is home to one of the few 24-hour subway systems in the world. The city's 25 subway services run through all boroughs except Staten Island, which is served 24/7 by the Staten Island Railway.

Subway riders pay using the OMNY contactless payment system, either by using a contactless bank card, mobile wallets like Google Pay and Apple Pay, or physical OMNY fare card. OMNY has gradually replaced the old MetroCard system, first being rolled out in October 2019, and by December 2020, all New York City Subway and MTA buses had been furnished with OMNY readers. Unexpired MetroCards with a remaining balance may still be used to pay fares, but the distribution, sales, and ability to add value or passes was discontinued by December 31st, 2025.

===== PATH =====
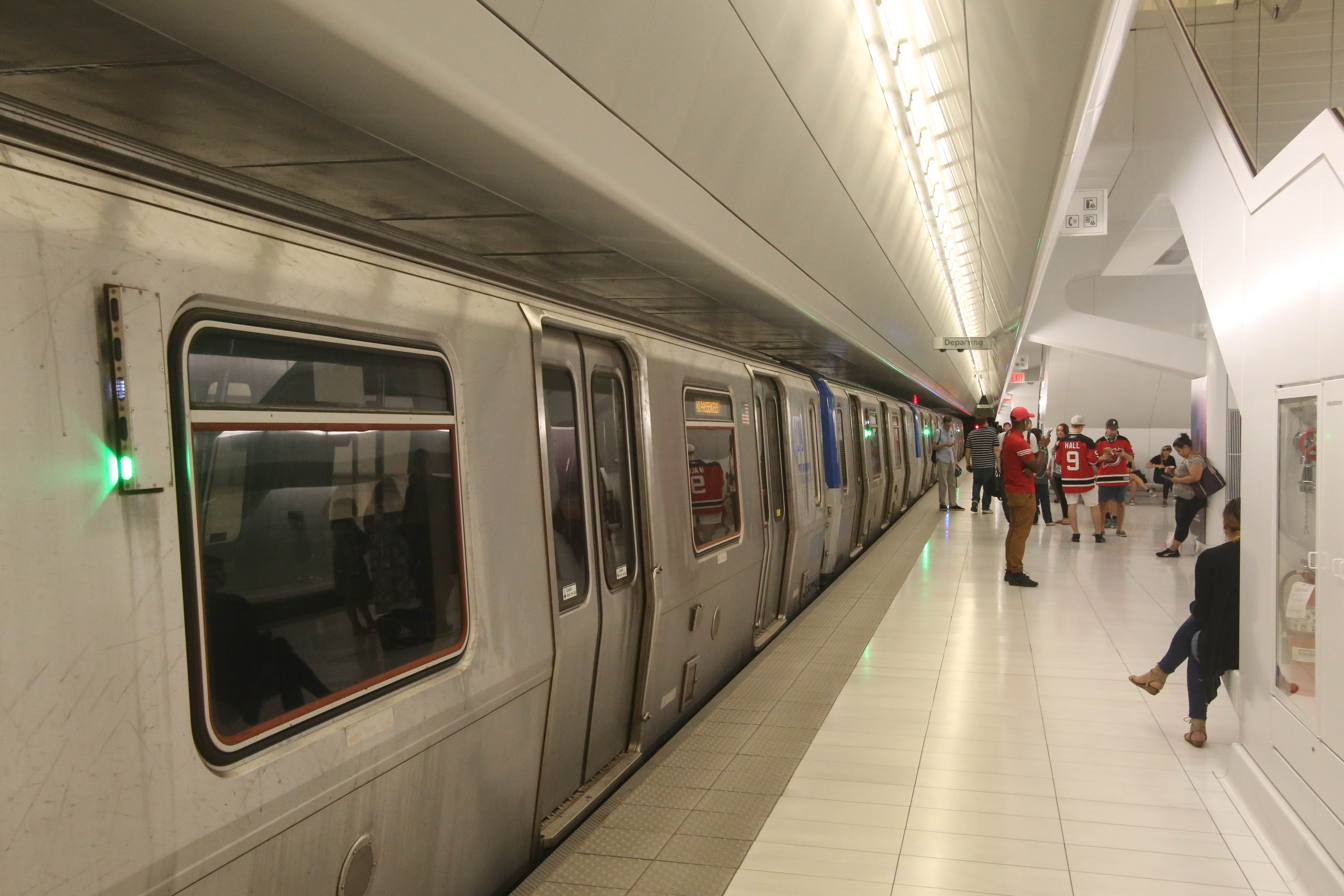
A PATH train at the World Trade Center station

The Port Authority Trans-Hudson (PATH) is a rapid transit system that links Manhattan to Jersey City, Hoboken, Harrison, and Newark, in New Jersey. A primary transit link between Manhattan and New Jersey, PATH carries 240,000 passengers each weekday on four lines.

While some PATH stations are adjacent to subway stations in New York City, Newark, and the Hudson-Bergen Light Rail stations in Hudson County, there are no free transfers. The PATH system spans 13.8 miles (22.2 km) of route mileage, not including track overlap. Like the New York City Subway, PATH operates 24 hours a day. Opened in 1908 as the privately owned Hudson and Manhattan Railroad, PATH has been operated by the Port Authority of New York and New Jersey since 1962.

==== Light rail ====
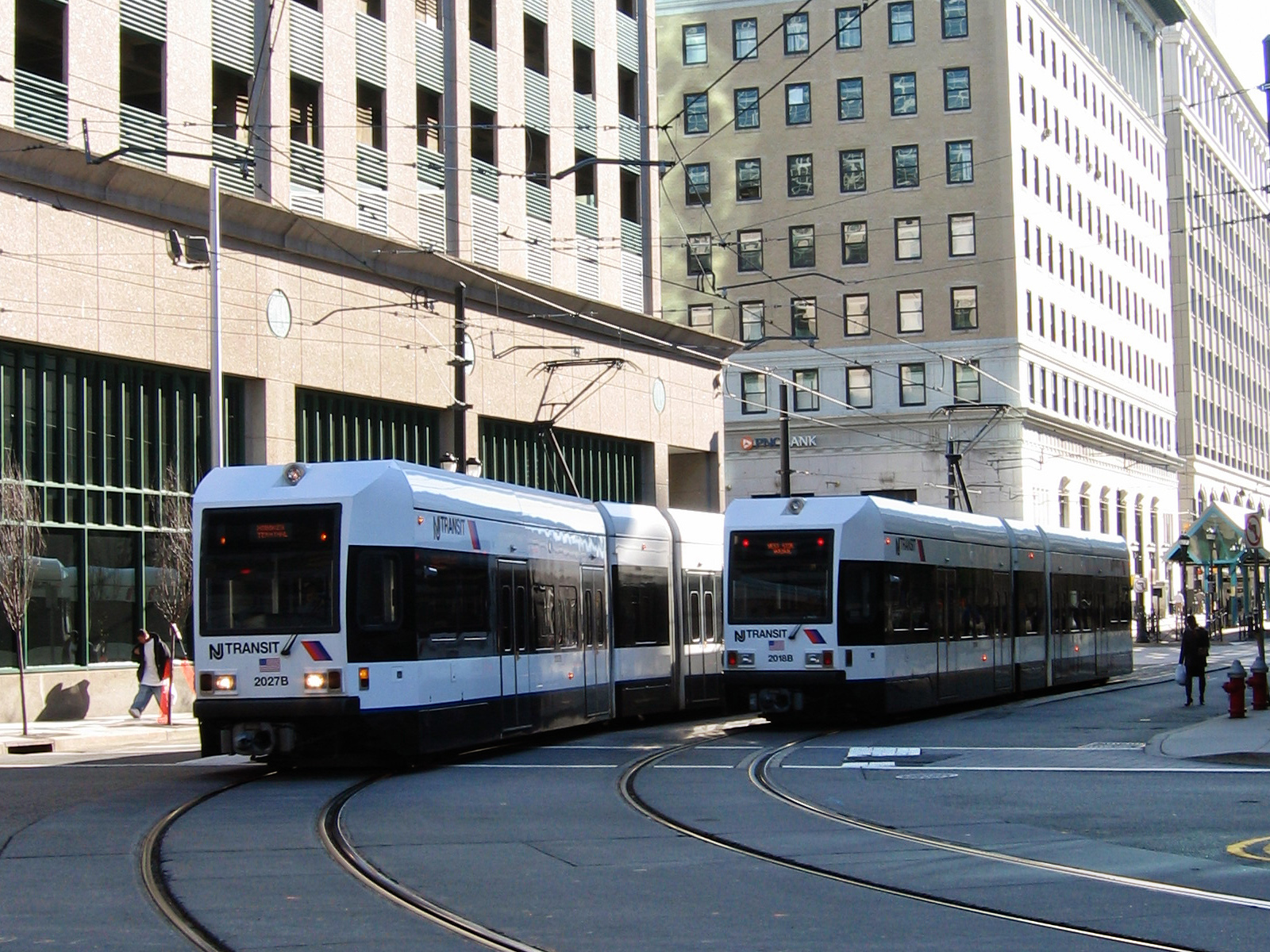
Two Hudson-Bergen Light Rail trains passing each other near Exchange Place.

New Jersey Transit manages two separate light rail lines in the New York metropolitan area: the Hudson-Bergen Light Rail and Newark Light Rail, which connects to transit systems that enter New York City proper. All of New Jersey Transit's light rail systems operate on a proof-of-payment fare collection system, as is typical of light rail systems throughout the United States.

The oldest system is the Newark Light Rail, consisting of the original Newark City Subway and the newer Broad Street Line. The Newark City Subway was opened in 1935, and was the sole remaining streetcar line when New Jersey Transit took operations in 1980. The Broad Street Line, which operates between Newark Penn Station and Broad Street Station, was opened in 2006.

The Hudson-Bergen Light Rail was constructed by New Jersey Transit during the early 2000s using the rights-of-way of freight railroads. The first Minimum Operating Segment of the Hudson-Bergen Light Rail was completed in 2002, and in 2006, service to its current northern terminus of Tonnelle Avenue began.

==== Airport services ====
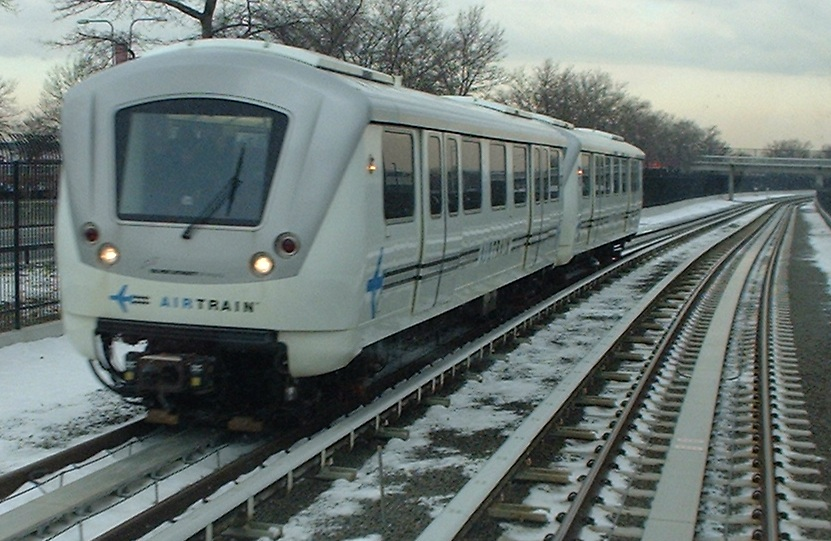
The AirTrain at John F. Kennedy International Airport

John F. Kennedy and Newark Liberty airports are served by intermodal rail systems and LaGuardia Airport is served only by buses. AirTrain JFK is an 8.1 mi (13 km) rapid transit system that connects Kennedy to New York's subway and commuter rail network in Queens 24 hours a day. It also provides free transit between airport terminals. For trips beyond the airport, the train costs $8.25. Roughly 4 million people rode the AirTrain to and from Kennedy in 2006, an increase of about 15% over 2005. AirTrain Newark is a 1.9-mile (3 km) monorail system connecting Newark's three terminals to commuter and intercity trains running on the Northeast Corridor rail line. The Q70 LaGuardia Link bus service connects LaGuardia Airport from the Woodside station fare free since 2022.

==== Commuter rail ====
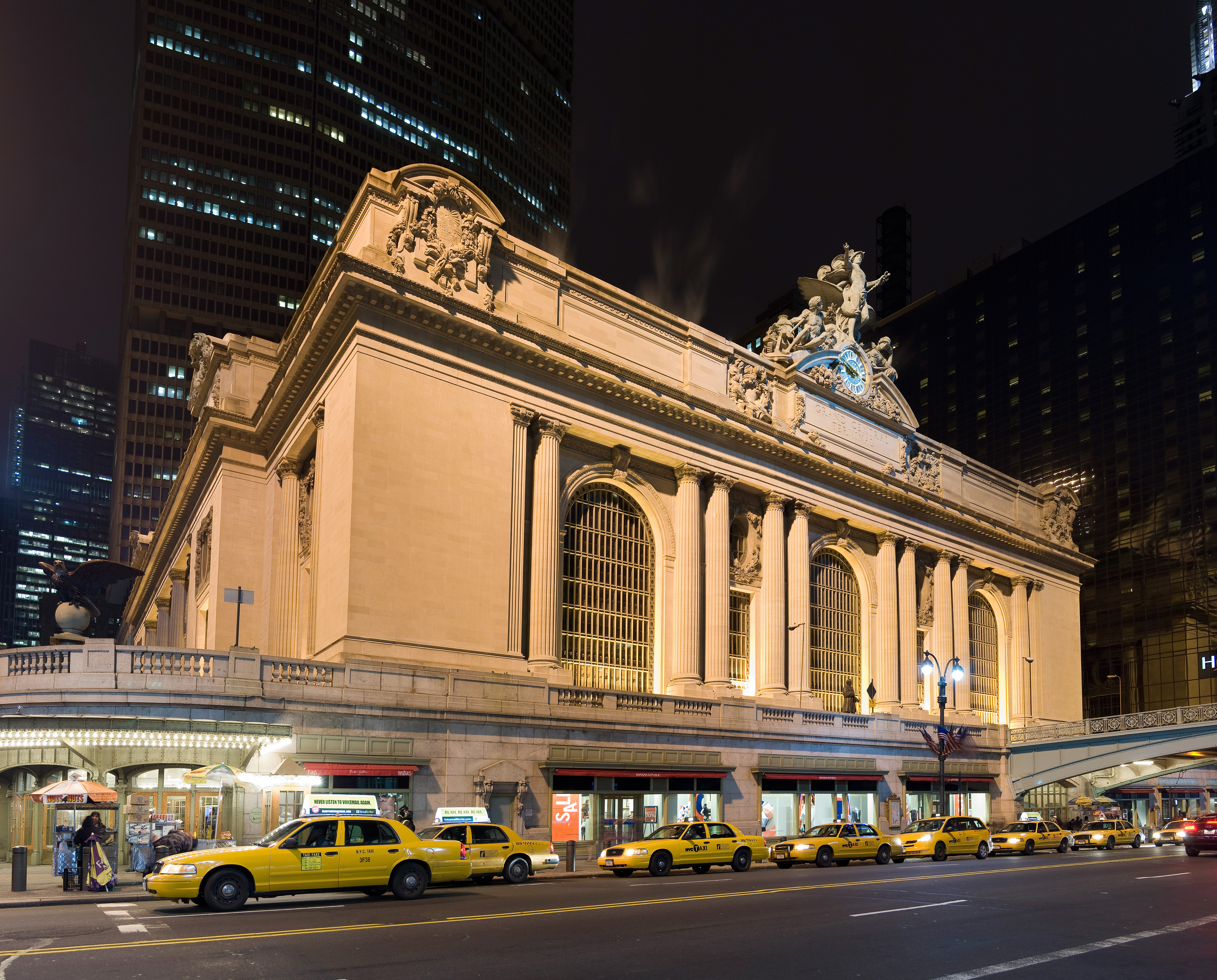
Grand Central Terminal, the second-busiest rail station in the country after Penn Station

New York City's commuter rail system is the most extensive in the United States, with about 250 stations and 20 rail lines serving more than 150 million commuters annually in the tri-state region. Commuter rail service from the suburbs is operated by two agencies. The MTA operates the Long Island Rail Road on Long Island and the Metro-North Railroad in the Hudson Valley and Connecticut. New Jersey Transit operates the rail network west of the Hudson River. These rail systems converge at the two busiest train stations in the United States, Penn Station and Grand Central Terminal, both in Manhattan.

In addition, connections are available to nearby commuter rail systems, including Southeast Connecticut's Shore Line East and Central Connecticut and Southern Massachusetts' Hartford Line in New Haven, Connecticut, and Southeast Pennsylvania's SEPTA in Trenton, New Jersey. Service is currently being considered to Scranton in Northeastern Pennsylvania via the Lackawanna Cut-Off.

==== Intercity rail ====
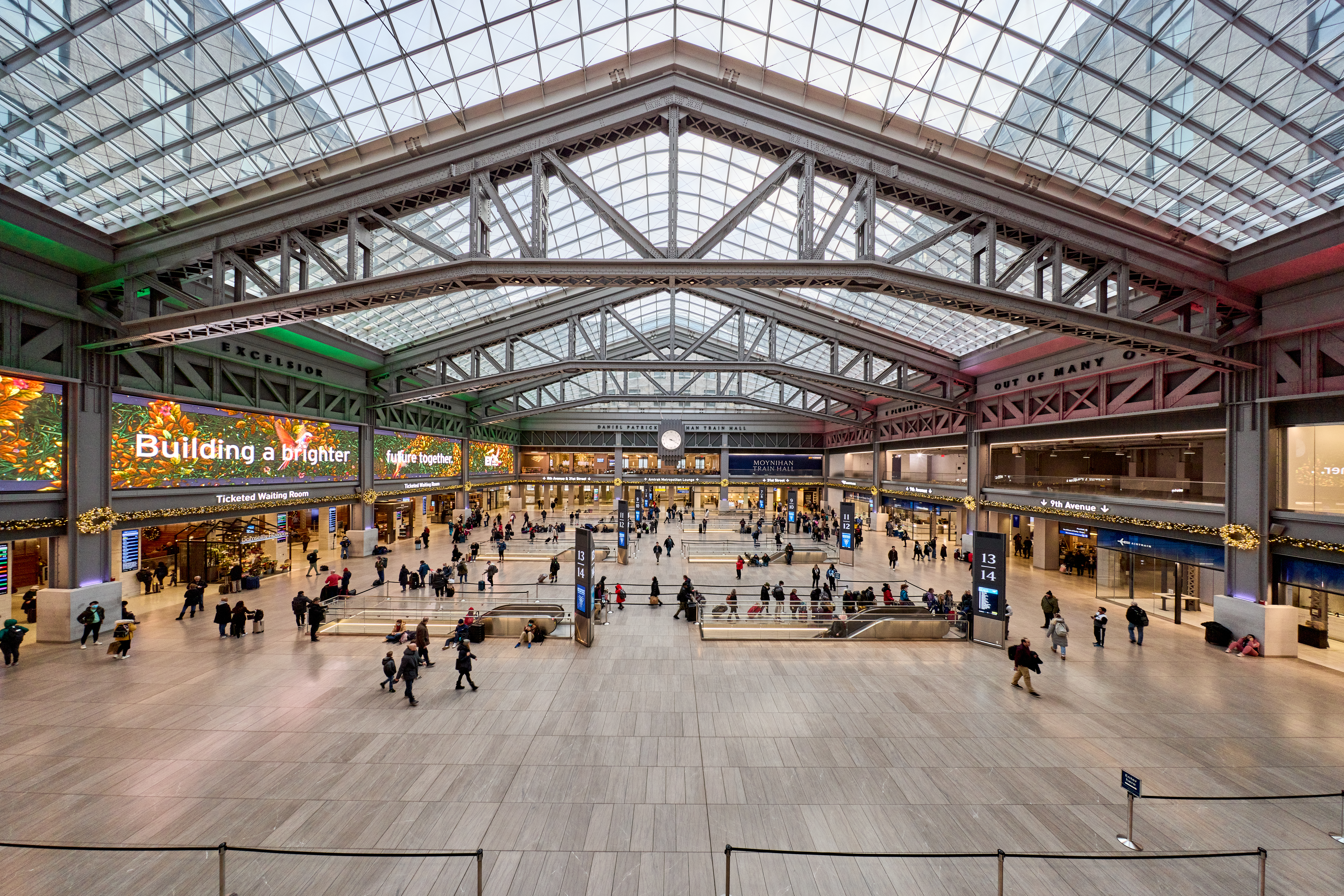
New York Penn Station, the busiest rail station in the country

While rail freight transportation in New York City and Long Island has atrophied with most freight activity now taking place in North Jersey, the city has more frequent passenger rail service, including both intercity and commuter, than any other city or location in the nation. Intercity service is provided by Amtrak. Fifty-four trains run each day on the busiest route, the Northeast Corridor from New York City to Philadelphia. For trips of less than 500 miles (800 km) to other Northeastern cities, Amtrak is often cheaper and faster than air travel. Amtrak accounts for 47% of all non-automobile intercity trips between New York City and Washington, D.C. and about 14% of all intercity trips (including those by automobile) between those cities.

Amtrak's high-speed Acela trains run from New York to Boston and Washington, D.C., via the Northeast Corridor, using tilting technology and fast electric locomotives. New York City's Penn Station is the busiest Amtrak station in the United States by annual boardings. In 2004, Acela had 4.4 million passenger boardings, more than double the second-busiest station, Union Station in Washington, D.C. It was expanded with a new concourse in 2017, and waiting hall in 2021.

Overnight trains connect New York City with Chicago (where numerous connections are available to the west coast services), Atlanta, New Orleans, and Miami. There are two daily trains to Miami, one daily train to Charlotte, and one daily train to Savannah. Chicago is connected with New York City by two trains: one runs daily via the Empire Corridor through Upstate New York and Cleveland, while another runs three times a week on a longer route via the Northeast Corridor & Cincinnati. Major destinations with frequent service include Albany, Baltimore, Boston, Harrisburg, Philadelphia, Providence, and Washington, D.C. There are also international daily trains to Toronto and Montreal in Canada, via the Empire Corridor to Albany and points west.

=== Buses ===
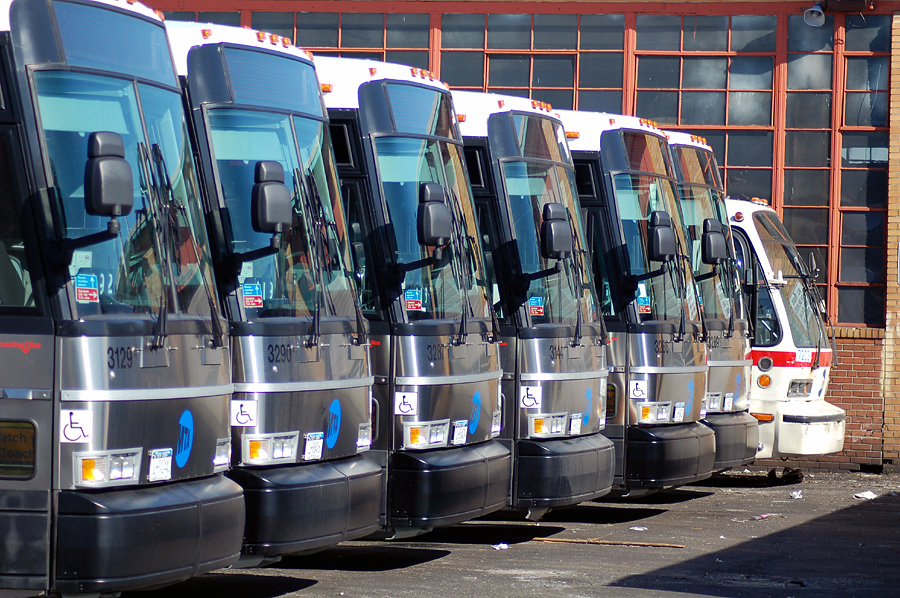
A lineup of MTA buses at LaGuardia Airport's bus depot in Queens

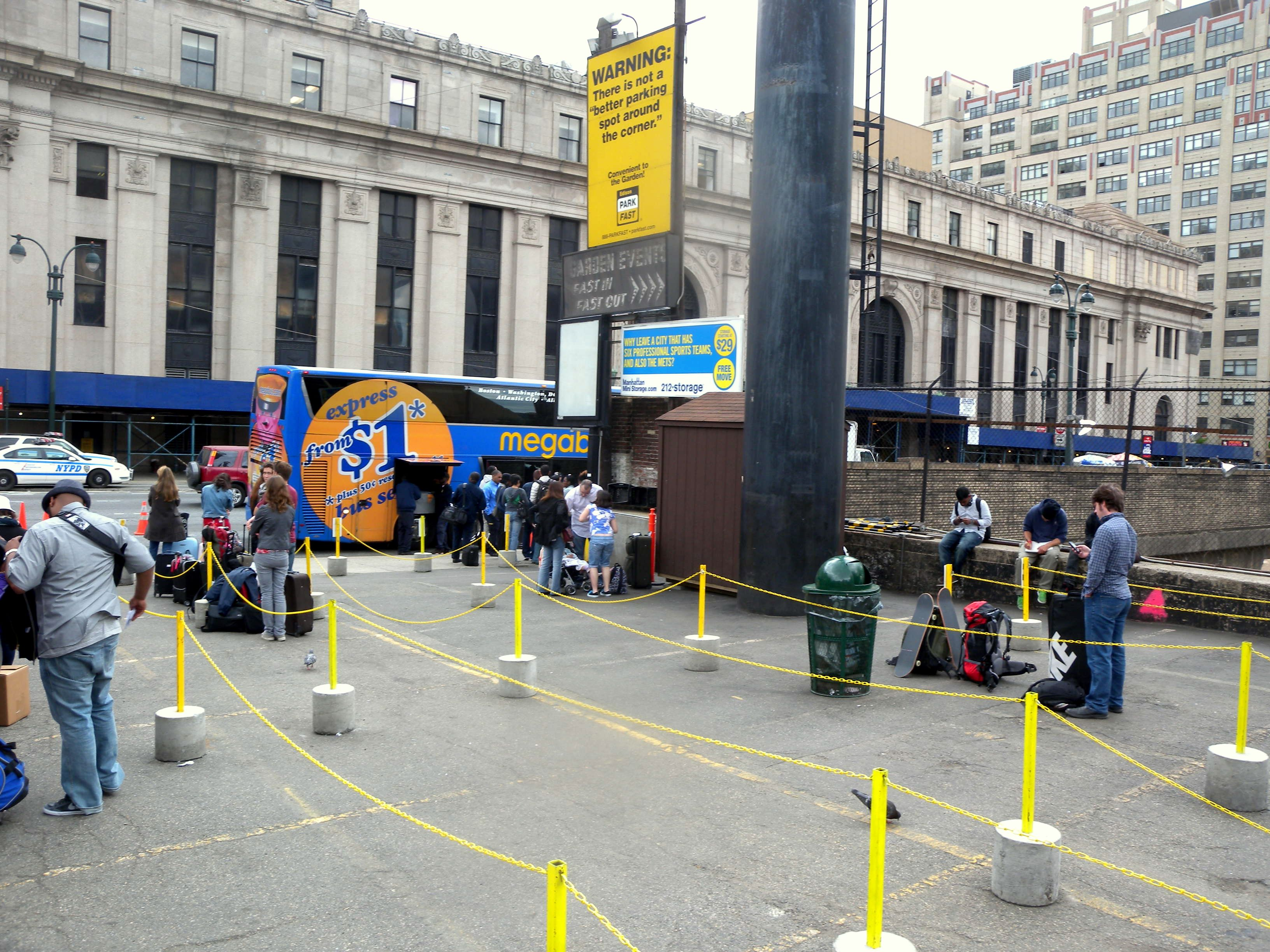
The Megabus waiting area on 10th Avenue

As of 2014, over 5,710 MTA Regional Bus Operations-operated buses carried about 2.5 million daily passengers 24/7 on more than 238 local routes, 62 express routes, and 7 Select Bus Service routes, amounting to 793 million annual bus trips. Buses owned by MTA account for 80% of the city's surface mass transit. New York City has the largest clean-air diesel-hybrid and compressed natural gas bus fleet in the United States.

Local bus routes are labeled with a number and a prefix identifying the primary borough (B for Brooklyn, Bx for the Bronx, M for Manhattan, Q for Queens, and S for Staten Island). Express bus routes operated under MTA New York City Bus use the letter X rather than a borough label. Express bus routes operated under MTA Bus (formerly controlled by the NYC Department of Transportation) use a two-borough system with an M at the end (i.e., BM, BxM, SIM, or QM). Additionally, MTA offers precise bus arrival time using a QR code located at each stop. Some stops also have digital panels indicating arrival times.

New York Waterway operates connecting bus routes to/from the West Midtown Ferry Terminal and East 34th Street Ferry Landing.

Private bus companies Hampton Jitney and Hampton Luxury Liner operate daily, year-round service from points on the east side of Manhattan to the villages and hamlets of Long Island's east end, including the Hamptons, Montauk, and the North Fork. Hampton Jitney also runs limited service to and from Lower Manhattan and Brooklyn.

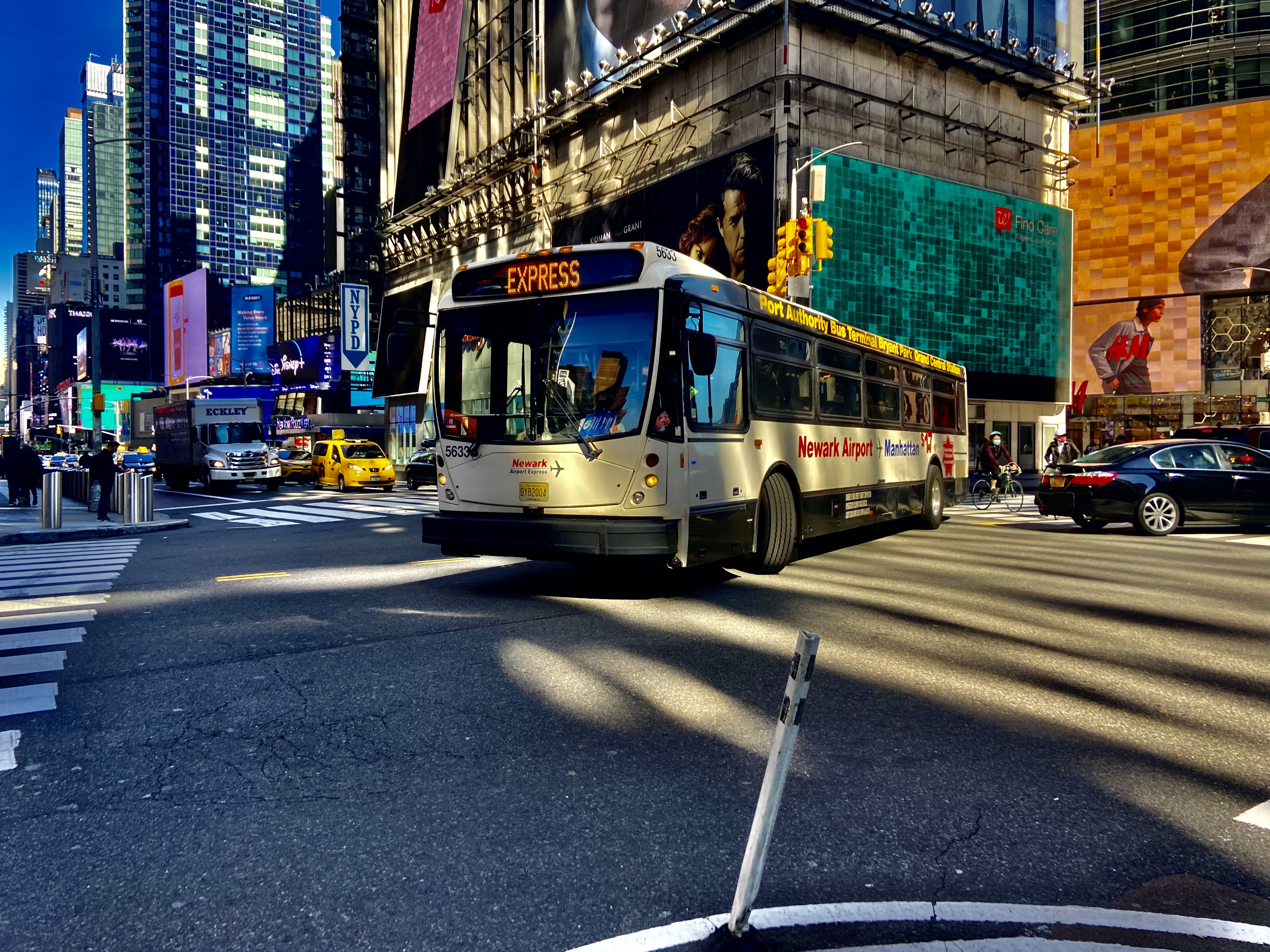
A NJ Transit bus on 7th Avenue in Midtown Manhattan

Several New Jersey Transit buses serve New York City via the Port Authority Bus Terminal and the George Washington Bridge Bus Station, connecting passengers to various locations in the New Jersey suburbs within the metropolitan area.

Several Chinatown bus lines began operating in 1997, offering curbside intercity coach service to Chinatown and Midtown Manhattan. Two discount intercity bus services, BoltBus and Megabus, have provided bus service between New York City and several other U.S. cities since 2008. Tripper Bus and Vamoose Bus provide bus service between New York City and the Washington, D.C. suburbs of Arlington, Virginia, and Bethesda, Maryland. BestBus provides daily service from a stop along West 34th Street near 9th Avenue to Washington, D.C., Silver Spring, Maryland, and Manassas, Vienna, and Springfield in Virginia and summer weekend service to Rehoboth Beach and Dewey Beach in Delaware.

=== Ferries ===
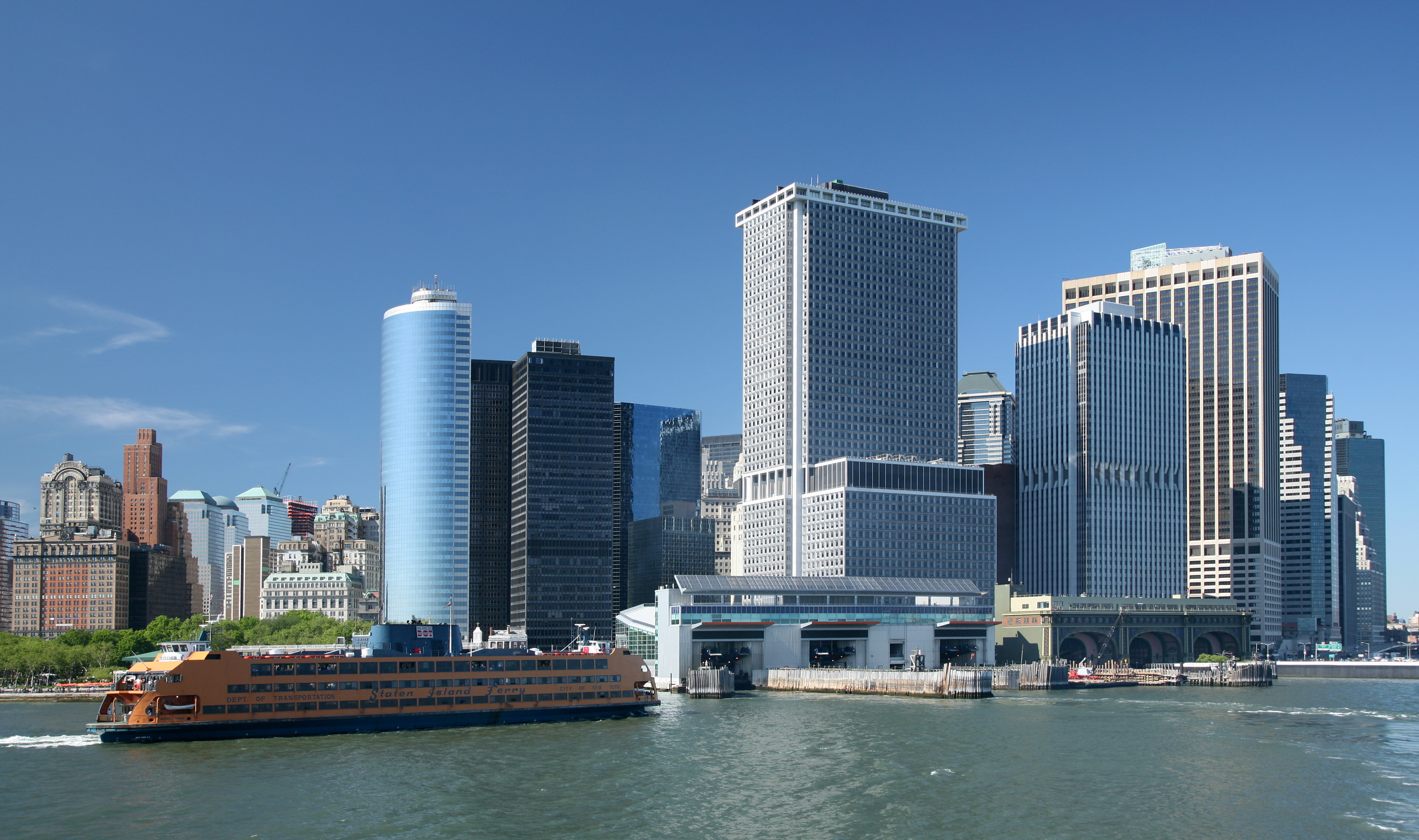
The Staten Island Ferry at the South Ferry terminal building in Lower Manhattan

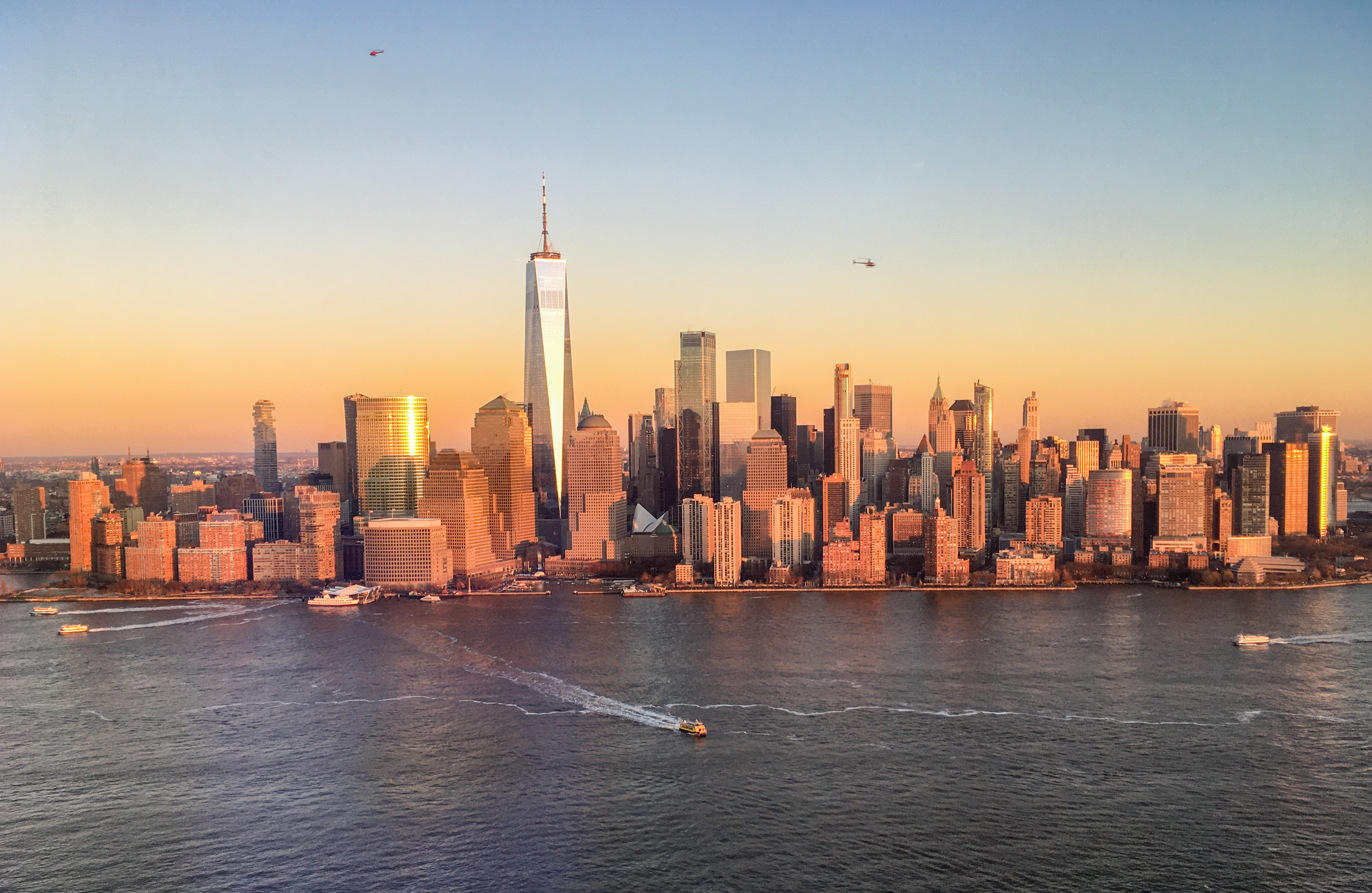
Ferries departing Battery Park City with helicopters flying above Manhattan

The busiest ferry in the United States is the Staten Island Ferry, which annually carries over 19 million passengers on the 5.2 mile (8.4 km) run between St. George Ferry Terminal and South Ferry. Service is provided 24 hours a day, 365 days a year, and takes approximately 25 minutes each way. Each day eight boats transport almost 65,000 passengers during 104 boat trips. Over 33,000 trips are made annually. The Ferry has remained free of charge since 1997. Vehicles have not been allowed on the Ferry since the September 11 attacks, though bicycles are permitted on the lower level at no cost. The ferry ride is a favorite of tourists as it provides excellent views of the Lower Manhattan skyline and the Statue of Liberty.

Since the 1980s ferry service on the Hudson River and East River has been restored and significantly expanded providing regular service to points in Manhattan, mostly below 42nd Street. Pier 11 at Wall Street, East 34th Street Ferry Landing, West Midtown Ferry Terminal and Battery Park City Ferry Terminal are major embarkation points. The terminals are run in public-private partnership with privately owned carriers.

In February 2015, Mayor Bill de Blasio announced that the city government would begin NYC Ferry to extend ferry transportation to traditionally underserved communities in the city. The first routes of NYC Ferry opened in 2017. All of the system's routes have termini in Manhattan, with routes reaching to Brooklyn, Queens, and the Bronx, as well as a future Staten Island route.

NY Waterway is a private company that operates under a public-private partnership. The ferry primarily runs between New Jersey and Manhattan, with most services coming from Hudson County. It has terminals in Edgewater, Weehawken, Hoboken, Jersey City, and South Amboy in New Jersey. These routes are served by the West Midtown Ferry Terminal, Pier 11/Wall Street, and Battery Park City. Additionally, NY Waterway operates one intra-NYC service, connecting Red Hook and the West Midtown Ferry Terminal, which was formerly operated by New York Water Taxi. The East River Ferry service, which began in 2011 under NY Waterway's operation, was merged into NYC Ferry in 2017.

SeaStreak is a private company that operates services from Manhattan to the Raritan Bayshore in Monmouth County, New Jersey. The company operates three primary terminals in New Jersey, including Belford, Atlantic Highlands, and Highlands. Additionally, SeaStreak offers seasonal service to Sandy Hook, New Jersey during the summer. Between 2012 and 2014, it also ran weekday morning and afternoon/evening service between East 34th Street and Pier 11 in Manhattan and Rockaway Park, Queens, with a stop at Brooklyn Army Terminal. The service began in late 2012 in the wake of massive subway infrastructure damage and service disruptions in Queens and Brooklyn from Hurricane Sandy, and was originally intended only as a temporary transportation alternative until subway service was restored, but it proved to be popular and was extended several times after that. However, it was ultimately discontinued in October 2014, despite vigorous efforts by local transportation advocates, civic leaders and elected officials to convince the city government to continue funding the subsidized service.

New York Water Taxi is a private company that does not regular services, rather it is a for-hire water taxi that takes customers between various ferry landings throughout New York City and New Jersey. The ferry's home port is Pier 83 at West 42nd Street in Manhattan, with a secondary home port at Pier 16/South Street Seaport.

Additionally, there is year-round ferry service to Ellis Island, Liberty Island, and Governors Island. Circle Line Downtown and Circle Line Sightseeing operate tourist routes into the Upper New York Bay or circumnavigate Manhattan.

Ferry landings include:

- Battery Park City Ferry Terminal, near the World Financial Center, served by NYC Ferry, NY Waterway, Liberty Water Taxi, New York Water Taxi
- East 34th Street Ferry Landing, served by NYC Ferry and SeaStreak
- Pier 11/Wall Street, served by NY Waterway, and SeaStreak
- West Midtown Ferry Terminal, served NY Waterway, NYC Ferry, and SeaStreak
- South Street Seaport, served by New York Water Taxi
- Whitehall Terminal (South Ferry), served by the Staten Island Ferry
- St. George Ferry Terminal, served by the Staten Island Ferry
- Fulton Slip, served by NYC Ferry
- Red Hook, served by NY Waterway and NYC Ferry

=== Aerial tramway ===
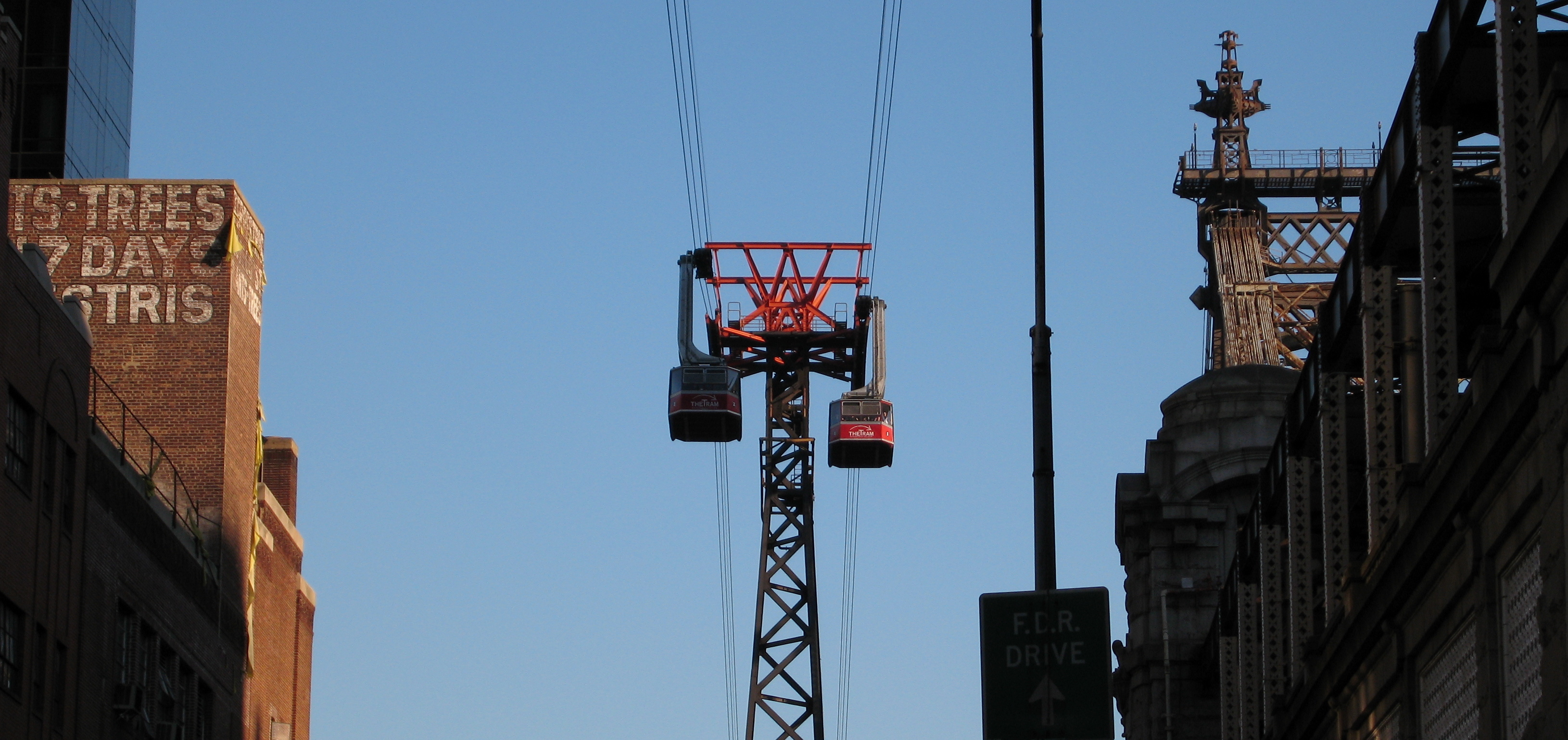
The Roosevelt Island Tramway crossing the East River

Built in 1976 to shuttle island residents to Midtown, the Roosevelt Island Tramway was originally intended to be a temporary commuter link for use until a subway station was established for the island. However, when the subway finally connected to Roosevelt Island in 1989, the tram was too popular to discontinue use.

The Tramway is operated by the Roosevelt Island Operating Corp (RIOC). Each cable car has a capacity of 125 passengers. Travel time from Roosevelt Island to Manhattan is just under five minutes and the fare is the same as a subway ride.

In 2006, service was suspended on the tramway for six months after a service malfunction that required all passengers to be evacuated.

=== Other transit ===
Other transit in the city includes:

- The Bee-Line Bus System, connecting the Bronx and Westchester County
- Nassau Inter-County Express, a bus system operated by Transdev that connects Queens and Nassau County. Until 2012, it was operated by the MTA under the brand Long Island Bus.
- The Downtown Connection, a free shuttle bus service in Lower Manhattan operated by the Downtown Alliance
- Private Transportation operates a bus route (labeled B110) between Borough Park and Williamsburg in Brooklyn.
- Dollar vans operate in boroughs outside Manhattan and in New Jersey.

=== Major transit hubs ===
There are several major transit terminals in the New York metropolitan area. They include train stations, bus terminals, and ferry landings.

Major rail stations include:

- Pennsylvania Station, which is served by Amtrak, Long Island Rail Road, New Jersey Transit, and the New York City Subway
- Grand Central Terminal, which is served by Metro-North Railroad, Long Island Rail Road and the New York City Subway
- Jamaica station, which is served by Long Island Rail Road, New York City Subway, and AirTrain JFK
- Atlantic Terminal, which is served by the New York City Subway and Long Island Rail Road
- Newark Pennsylvania Station, which is served by Amtrak, New Jersey Transit, PATH and Newark Light Rail
- Hoboken Terminal, which is served by New Jersey Transit, Metro-North Railroad, PATH, Hudson-Bergen Light Rail, and NY Waterway

Major bus hubs include:

- Port Authority Bus Terminal, served by commuter and intercity buses. The busiest bus station in the United States, the terminal serves both commuter routes, mainly operated by New Jersey Transit, and national routes operated by private companies, such as Greyhound and Peter Pan.
- George Washington Bridge Bus Station, also served by commuter and some intercity buses. Most commuter buses are from New Jersey and Rockland County.
- Penn Station is used by Megabus, Tripper Bus and Vamoose Bus.
- Chinatown, including the corner of East Broadway and Forsyth Street, where several intercity Chinatown buses have a common terminus.

== Roads and expressways ==
Despite New York's reliance on public transit, roads are a defining feature of the city. Manhattan's street grid plan greatly influenced the city's physical development. Several of the city's streets and avenues, like Broadway, Wall Street and Madison Avenue are also used as shorthand or metonym in American vernacular for national industries located there: theater, finance, and advertising, respectively.

In Manhattan, there are twelve numbered avenues that run parallel to the Hudson River, and 220 numbered streets that run perpendicular to the river.

An advanced convergence indexing road traffic monitoring system was installed in New York City for testing purposes in May 2008.

To keep roadways, tunnels, and bridges safe for pedestrians and drivers, New York City has made efficient use of timers to regulate traffic lighting and help conserve energy.

=== Bridges and tunnels ===
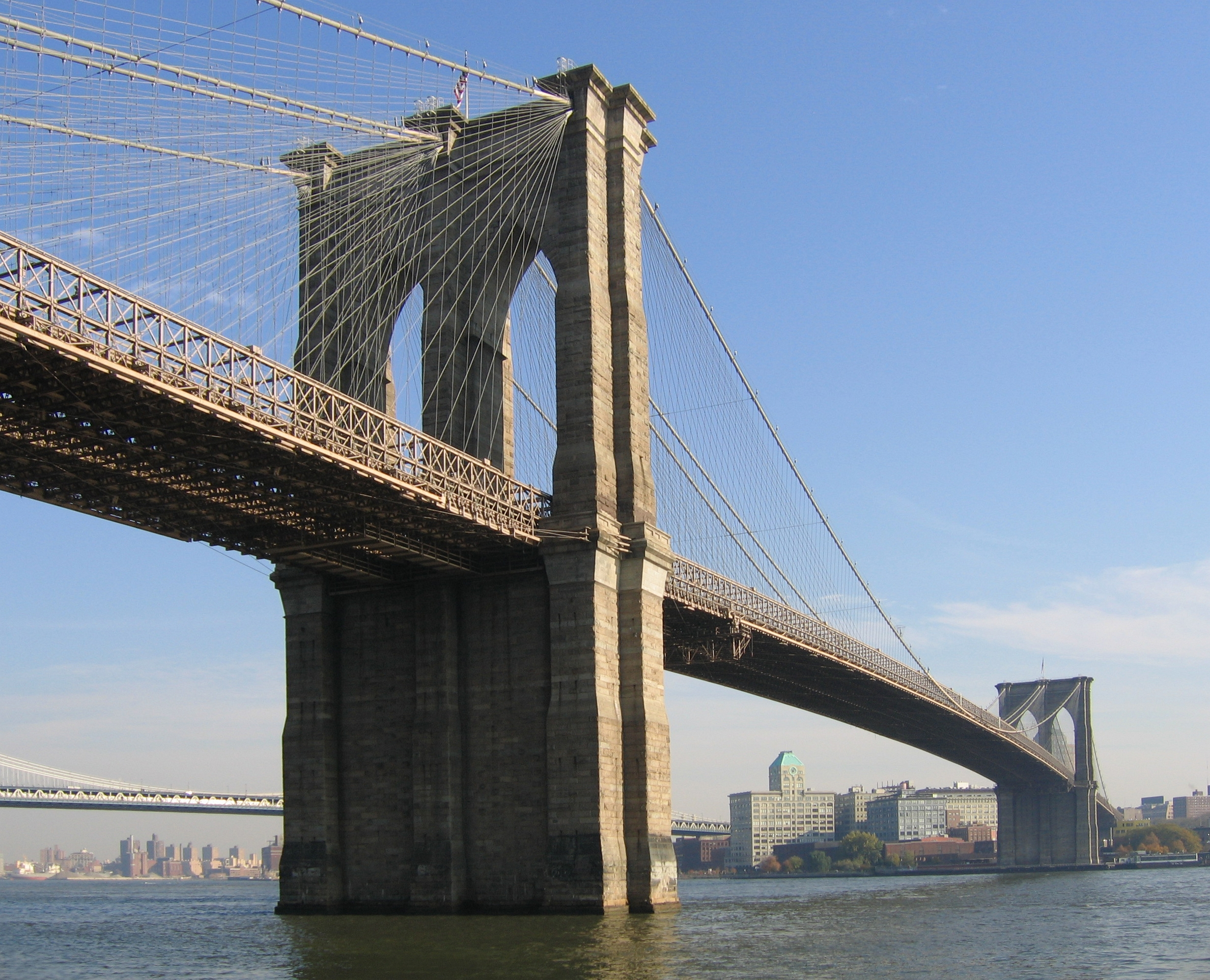
The Brooklyn Bridge, one of the world's most recognizable structures, connects Manhattan with Brooklyn

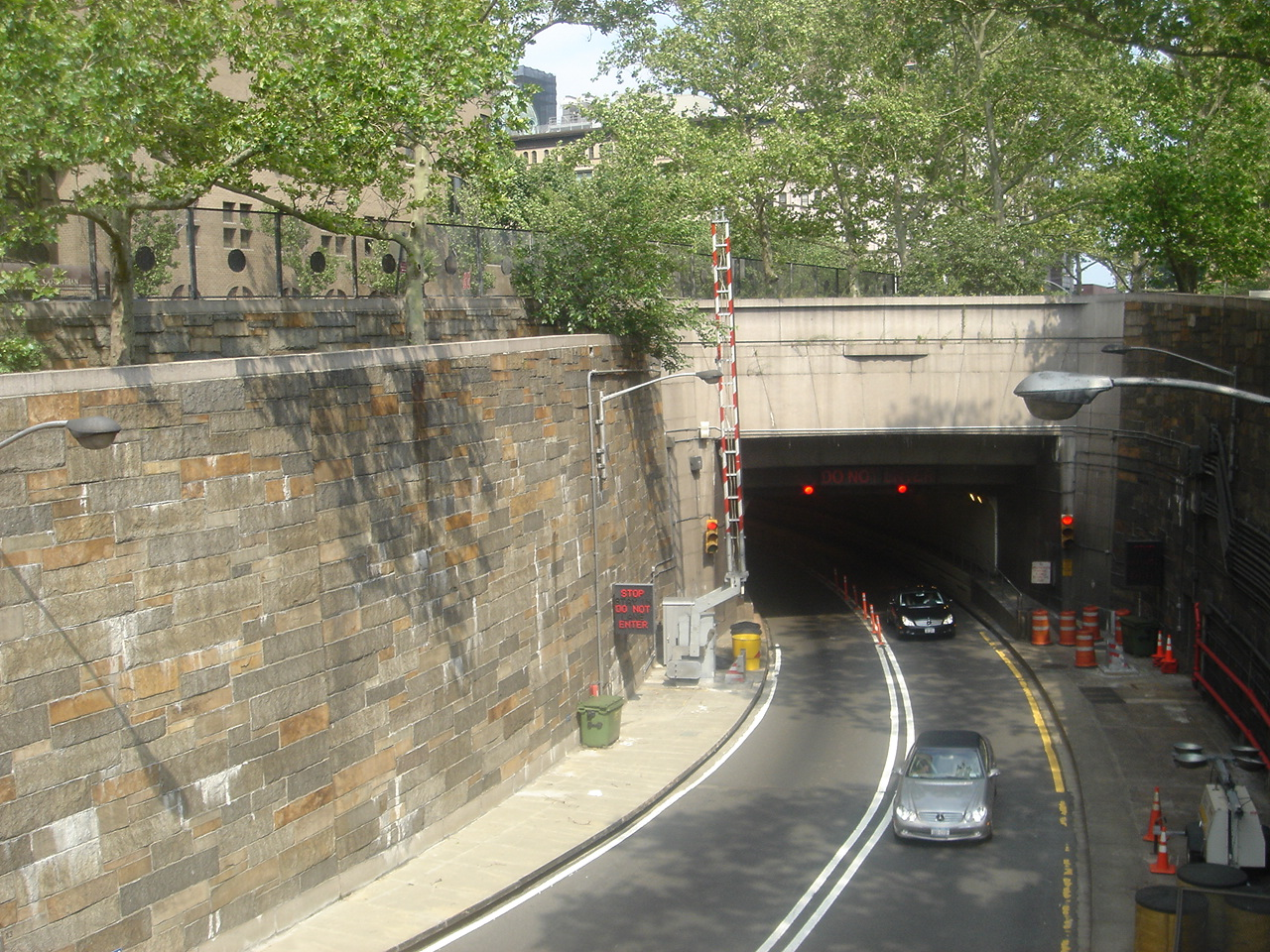
Queens–Midtown Tunnel, the start of the Long Island Expressway

With its Gothic-revival double-arched stone towers and diagonal suspension wires, the Brooklyn Bridge is one of the city's most recognized architectural structures, depicted by artists such as Hart Crane and Georgia O'Keeffe. The Brooklyn Bridge's main span is 1,596 feet 6 inches (486.61 m), and was the longest in the world when it was completed. The Williamsburg Bridge and Manhattan Bridge are the two others in the trio of architecturally notable East River crossings. The Ed Koch Queensboro Bridge, which links Manhattan and Queens, is an important piece of cantilever bridge design. The borough of Staten Island is connected to Brooklyn through the Verrazzano–Narrows Bridge. The George Washington Bridge, spanning the Hudson River between New York City and Fort Lee, New Jersey, is the world's busiest bridge in terms of vehicular traffic.

New York has historically been a pioneer in tunnel construction. Most carry rail lines, but there are four exceptions. The Lincoln Tunnel, which carries 120,000 vehicles per day under the Hudson River between New Jersey and Manhattan, is the world's busiest vehicular tunnel. The Holland Tunnel, also under the Hudson River, was the first mechanically ventilated vehicular tunnel in the world and is considered a National Civil Engineering Landmark by the American Society of Civil Engineers. Two other notable tunnels connect Manhattan to other places; one is the Queens Midtown Tunnel, and the other is the Hugh L. Carey Tunnel. At 9,117 feet (2,779 m), the Hugh L. Carey Tunnel, formerly known as the Brooklyn-Battery Tunnel, is the longest underwater tunnel in North America.

=== Expressways ===
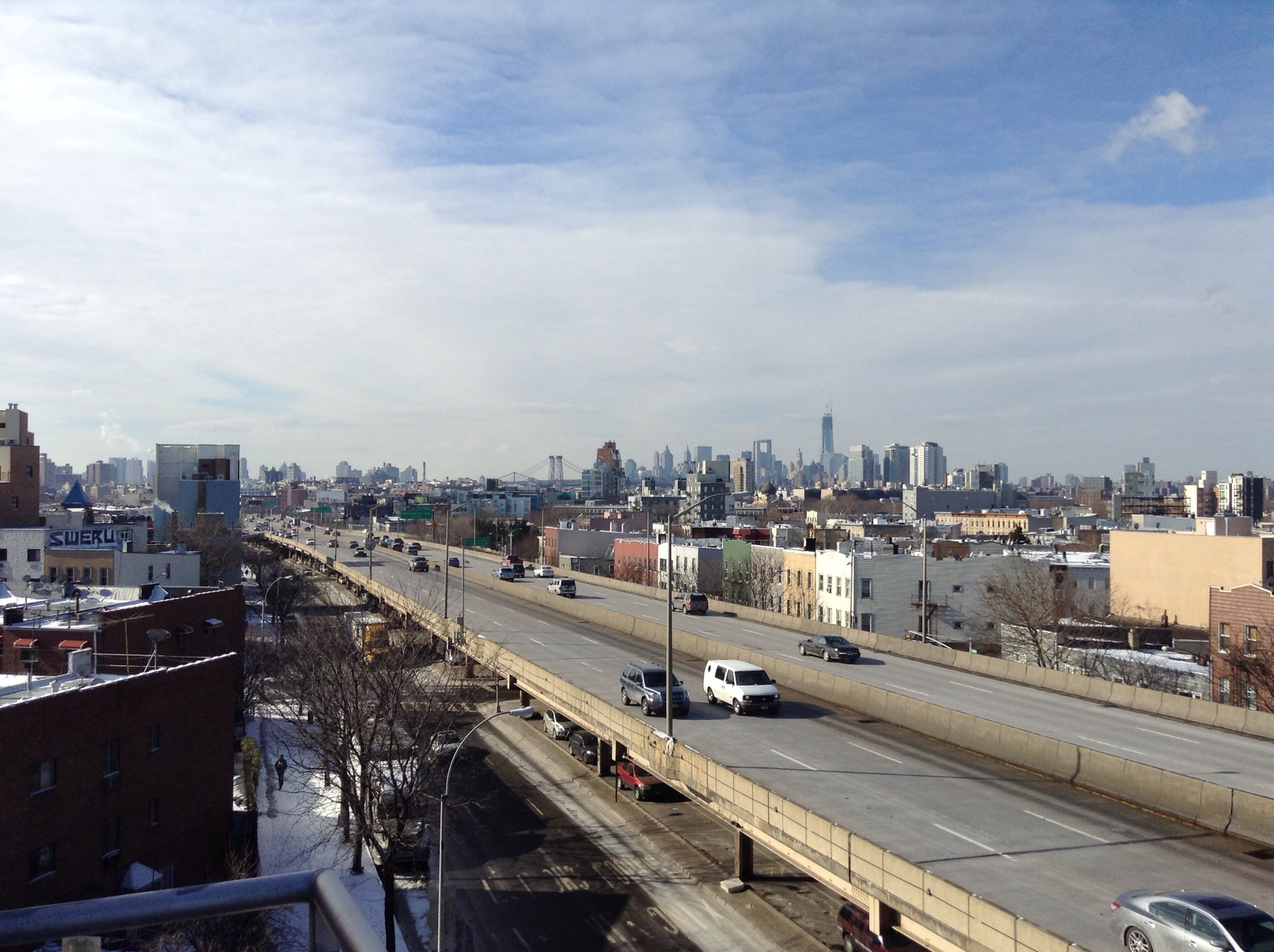
The Brooklyn–Queens Expressway

A less favored alternative to commuting by rail and boat is the New York region's expressway network, designed primarily by city planner Robert Moses. The city's extensive network of expressways includes four primary interstate highways, Interstate 78, Interstate 80, Interstate 87, and Interstate 95. Interstate 78 and Interstate 87 terminate in the city, I-78 in lower Manhattan and I-87 in the southern Bronx. Interstate 95 passes through Manhattan and the Bronx, and Interstate 80's eastern terminus is in Teaneck, New Jersey.

I-278 and I-287 each serve as a partial beltway around the city; Interstate 278 in Staten Island, Brooklyn, Queens, and the Bronx, and Interstate 287 in Westchester County, Rockland County, and North Jersey. I-495 begins at the Queens Midtown Tunnel as the Queens-Midtown Expressway, becomes the Horace Harding Expressway between Queens Boulevard and the Nassau County limits and finally becomes the Long Island Expressway into the Long Island suburbs. The 'LIE' moniker is commonly used by denizens of the city to describe the entire length of highway.

New York's limited-access parkways, another Moses Project, are frequently congested as well, despite being designed from the outset to only carry cars, as opposed to commercial trucks or buses. The FDR Drive (originally known as the East River Drive) and Harlem River Drive are two such routes that run along the eastern edge of Manhattan. The Henry Hudson Parkway, the Bronx River Parkway and the Hutchinson River Parkway link the Bronx to nearby Westchester County and its parkways; the Grand Central Parkway and Belt Parkway provide similar functions for Long Island's parkway system.

=== Private automobiles ===
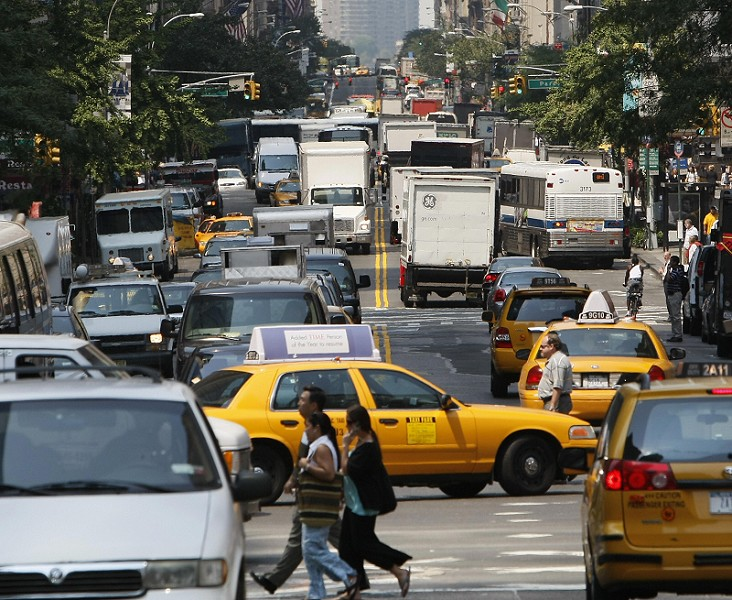
Rush hour in Manhattan in February 2009

The city's traffic lights are controlled from a Department of Transportation center in Long Island City, with frequent adjustments to alleviate the city's chronic congestion.

Around 48% of New Yorkers own cars, yet fewer than 30% use them to commute to work, most finding public transportation cheaper and more convenient for that purpose, due in large part to traffic congestion which also slows buses. To ease traffic, the Mayor, Michael R. Bloomberg, in 2007 proposed congestion pricing for motor vehicles entering Manhattan's business district from 6:00 a.m. to 6:00 p.m. However, this proposal was defeated when Sheldon Silver, Speaker of the New York State Assembly, announced that the bill would not come up for a vote in his chamber.

The number of gas stations in Manhattan is 40 and falling, causing congestion around them. Due to the lack of competition and high cost of operations, fuel is often more expensive in Manhattan compared to state and national averages.

Although the rate of electric vehicle ownership in New York City is low compared to the rate of ownership of traditional gas vehicles, there were over 3,000 electric vehicles registered to New York City and Westchester residents between 2011 and 2014, out of almost 300,000 total vehicles registered during this time. There were over 200 public charging stations in New York City, including 105 charging stations in Manhattan, by the end of March 2016. Most charging stations are 208 V or 240 V "Level 2 chargers," but there are also 120 V "Level 1 chargers" in private homes and workplaces; 480 V "DC fast chargers" in some locations; and several Tesla Superchargers around the city, for use only by Tesla, Inc.-manufactured vehicles.

==== Congestion pricing ====
Congestion pricing in New York City is a traffic congestion fee for vehicles traveling into or within lower and midtown Manhattan. The congestion pricing charge was one component of Mayor Michael Bloomberg's plan to improve the city's future environmental sustainability while planning for population growth, entitled PlaNYC 2030: A Greener, Greater New York. However, it was not approved then, as it was not put to a vote on the Assembly. It was approved in March 2024 and implemented on January 5, 2025.

==== Delivery trucks ====
Since the beginning of the 21st century, the growth of e-commerce companies such as Amazon has resulted in an increase in delivery trucks within New York City, with 1.5 million packages being delivered per day by 2019. Several logistics hubs and warehouses have been built within the city to more quickly distribute packages in the New York City area. In 2016, NYCDOT commissioner Polly Trottenberg said that 90% of goods transported into New York City arrived via truck.

The influx of large motor vehicles on the already constricted city streets has had a considerable effect on the flow of traffic. In the most congested areas of Manhattan, vehicle traffic in 2019 moves 23% slower than in 2010, and for the bridges and tunnels funneling traffic to and from the city, traffic has slowed down even more considerably. As a result, traffic-related pollution increased around 9% from 1990 to 2019, even when adjusted for population growth.

Though it is legal for delivery trucks to double park in most locations while making deliveries during off-peak hours, this often leads to congestion on the surrounding streets when double parking occurs during peak hours. There are often complaints that delivery trucks take up bike lanes and parking spaces. In 2018 alone, four delivery companies (UPS, FedEx, FreshDirect, and Peapod) were fined a combined $27 million due to parking and traffic violations. However, some delivery companies continued to double-park, incorporating any double-parking fines into the delivery fee. Further, the city's Stipulated Parking Fine Program allows drivers to eliminate their previous double-parking violations by paying a predetermined fine without challenging it in court.

As a result, in 2019, the NYCDOT started enforcing rules to restrict deliveries in the midtown zone during peak hours, impose a time limit on deliveries, and ban commercial double-parking on streets with one lane of traffic. To reduce peak-hour traffic and truck emissions, the NYCDOT also operates the Off-Hour Deliveries Program in Manhattan's midtown zone, which requires deliveries in that zone to be made between 7 pm to 6 am.

=== Taxis ===
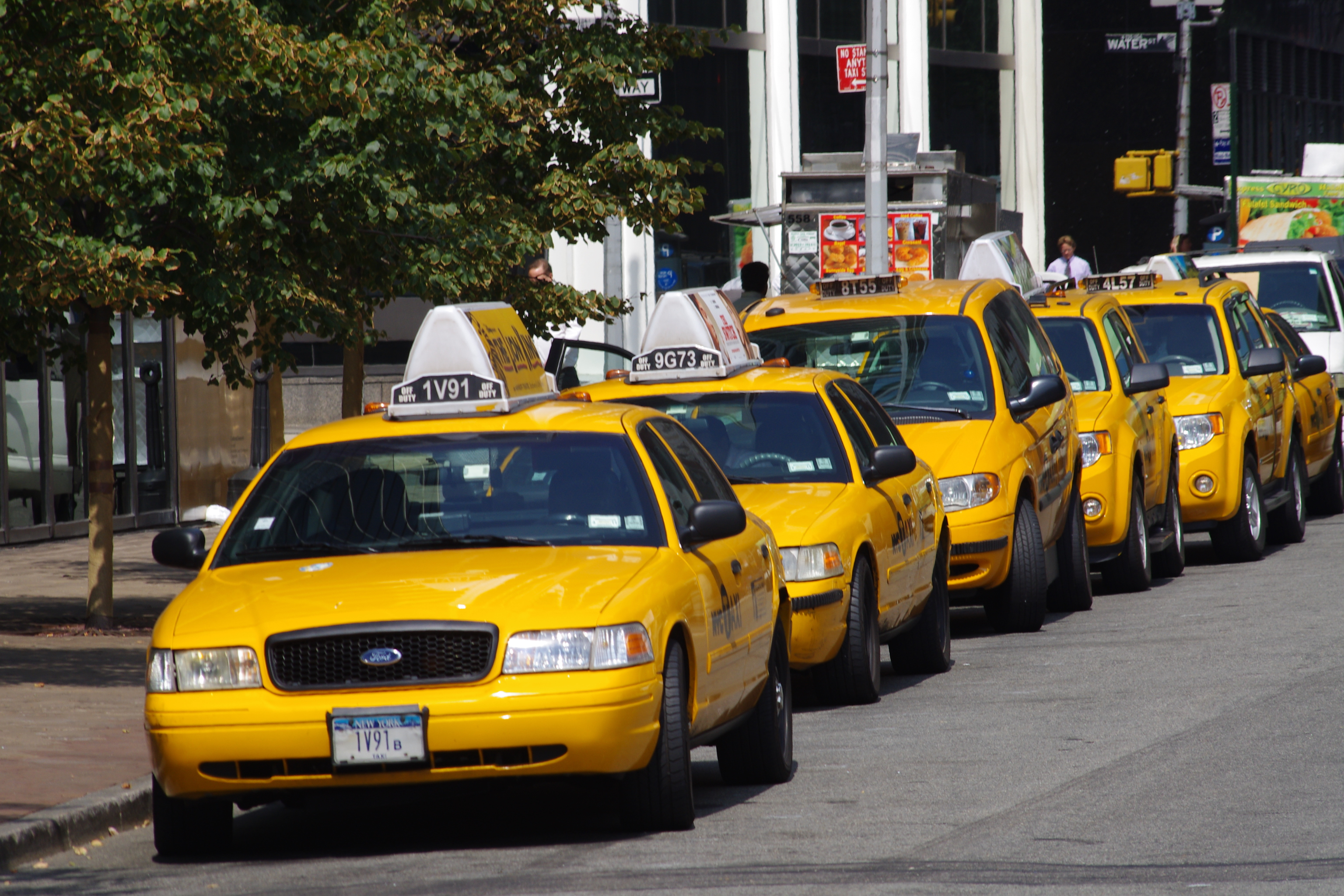
Yellow cabs in Lower Manhattan

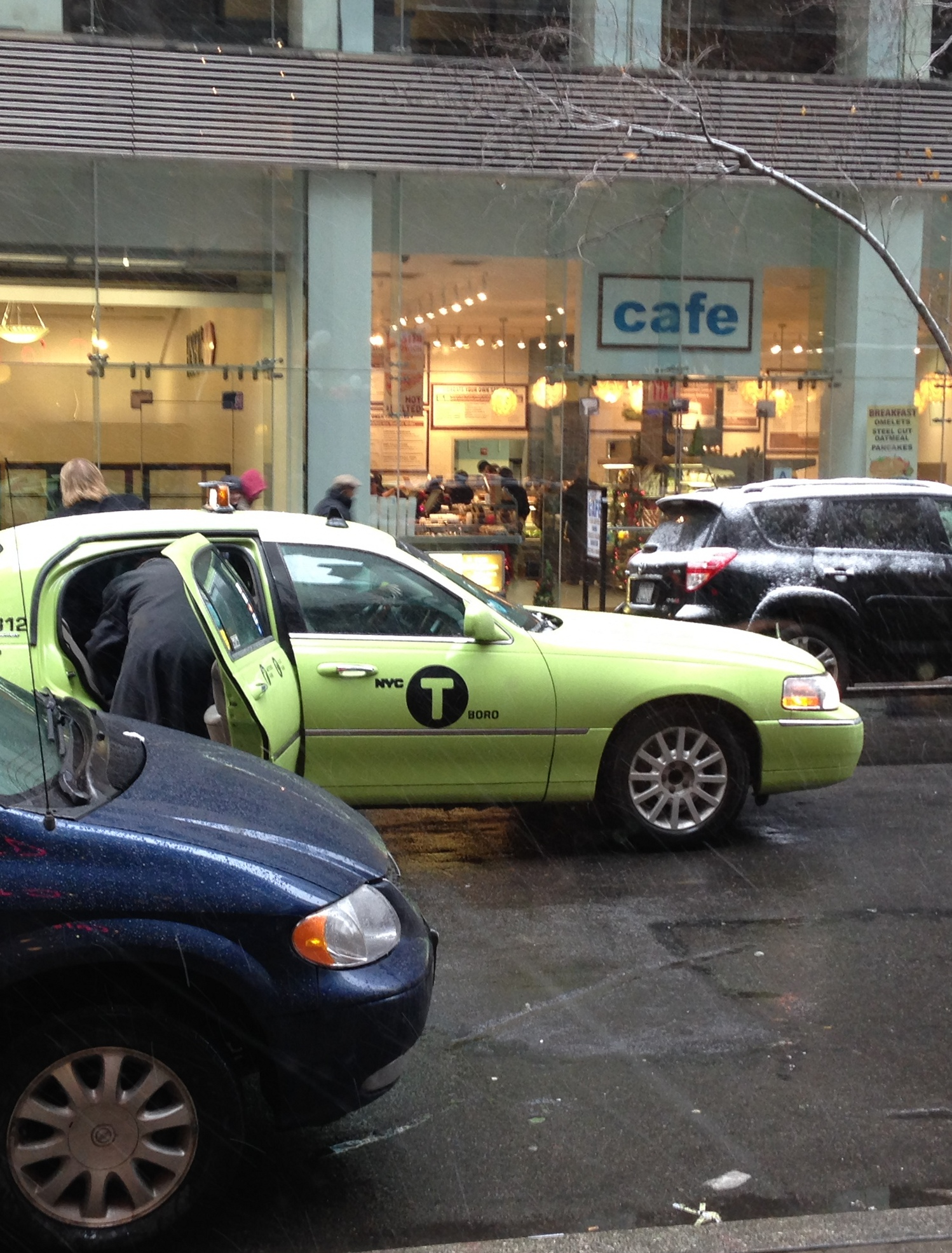
A boro taxi drops passengers off inside the yellow zone, where taxis are not allowed to pick up new passengers, in Midtown Manhattan.

There are 13,237 taxis operating in New York City, not including over 40,000 other for-hire vehicles. Their distinctive yellow paint has made them New York icons.

Taxicabs are operated by private companies and licensed by the New York City Taxi and Limousine Commission. "Medallion taxis", the familiar yellow cabs, are historically the only vehicles in the city permitted to pick up passengers in response to a street hail. In 2013, a new type of street hailed livery vehicles called "boro taxis" in "apple green" color are permitted to pick up passengers in the outer boroughs and the northern part of Manhattan. A cab's availability is indicated by the light on the top of the car. When the light is lit, the cab is empty and available; when it is not lit, the cab is unavailable.

Fares begin at US$3.00 and increase based on the distance traveled and time spent in slow traffic. The passenger also must pay for tolls incurred during the ride. The average cab fare in 2000 was US$6.00; over US$1 billion in fares were paid that year in total.

Since 1999, 241 million passengers have ridden in taxis in New York City. According to the 2000 U.S. Census, of the 42,000 cabbies in New York, 82% are foreign born: 23% from the Caribbean (the Dominican Republic and Haiti), and 20% from South Asia (India, Pakistan, and Bangladesh). Additionally, a large number of American citizen taxi drivers in New York are Puerto Rican or of Puerto Rican descent. In 2014, 23.1% of taxi drivers were from Bangladesh, 13.2% from Pakistan, 9.3% from India, 6.5% from Haiti, 5.9% from the U.S., and 4.4% from Egypt.

In 2005, New York introduced incentives to replace its current yellow cabs with electric hybrid vehicles then in May 2007, New York City Mayor, Michael Bloomberg, proposed a five-year plan to switch New York City's taxicabs to more fuel-efficient hybrid vehicles as part of an agenda for New York City to reduce greenhouse gas emissions as well as surging fuel costs. In 2010, Nissan won a contract to provide the New York with a design based on their NV200 minivan model.

=== Pedicabs, pedestrians, and bicycles ===
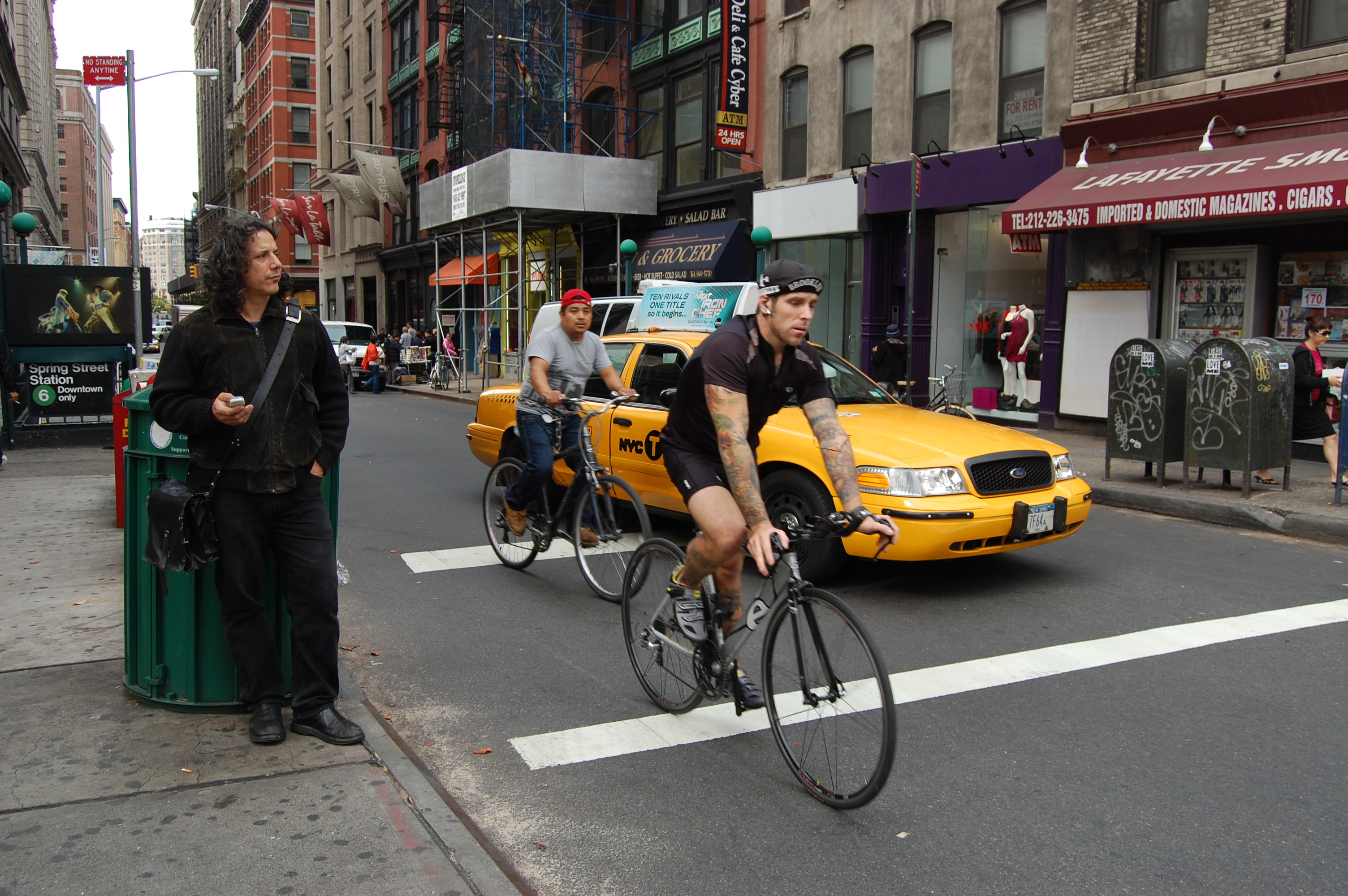
Bikes and a cab in Manhattan

Cycling in New York City is another means of transport in New York City. In 2009, an estimated 200,000 city residents bicycle on a typical day, and make 655,000 trips each day, greater than the number of the ten most popular bus routes in the city.

The city annually hosts the largest recreational cycling event in the United States, the Five Boro Bike Tour, in which 30,000 cyclists ride 42 miles (68 km) through the city's boroughs.

More than 500 people annually work as bicycle rickshaw, or pedicab, drivers, who in 2005 handled one million passengers. The City Council voted twice, including an override of Mayor Bloomberg's veto due to the market cap, in 2007 to license pedicab owners and drivers and allow only 325 pedicab licenses. Neither the limit on pedicabs nor the law itself went into effect due to a successful New York City Pedicab Owners' Association lawsuit over permit issuance. Ultimately, 943 pedicab business owners permits were issued in November 2009 after a second law was passed to address shortcomings of the 2007 law. Today, pedicabs meet market demand in midtown for both ecological transport as well as quick trips within the central business district during afternoon rush hours when motor traffic moves cross town at an average speed of 4.5 miles per hour.

In 2019, New York City had a higher modal share of walking than any other city in the United States at 31% of all trips. By way of comparison, the next city with the largest proportion of walking commuters, Boston, had 119,294 commuter pedestrians, amounting to 4.1% of that city's commuters.

Citibank sponsored the introduction of 6,000 public bicycles for the city's bike-share project, Citi Bike, in mid-2013. Research conducted by Quinnipiac University showed that a majority of New Yorkers supported the initiative. Throughout the first year operations, there were more than 100,000 registered members who rode over 14,700,000 miles (23,700,000 km), including 70,000 members in the first three months alone. In 2014, Citi Bike announced that it would expand its operations by 6,000 bikes and add 375 new docking stations by 2017.

In November 2018, a further, five-year expansion was announced, which would double the bike-share system's service area to 35 square miles (91 km^{2}). In addition, the number of bicycles would more than triple, from 12,000 to 40,000. Stalls would be installed in the remainder of Manhattan, as well as parts of Brooklyn, Queens, and the Bronx.

A "green wave" refers to the programming of traffic lights to allow for continuous traffic flow (a series of green lights) over a number of intersections in one direction. In New York City, this “green wave” prioritizes bikers by timing traffic lights around the average biking speed, in addition to mitigating the negative effects of heavy automotive congestion. After a series of bicyclist deaths in 2019, the highest death toll for cyclists in two decades, the city decided to retime traffic lights, so that vehicles would have to travel an average of 15 miles per hour (24 km/h) between consecutive green lights.

Transportation commissioner Polly Trottenberg has pushed for increasing bike lanes to demonstrate the city's progress and commitment to transportation safety. However, with the expansion of cycling in New York City, there has been pushback from motorists. For example, in 2019, motorists and Upper West Side residents objected after two hundred parking spaces along Central Park West were eliminated to allow bike lane expansion.

=== Dollar vans ===
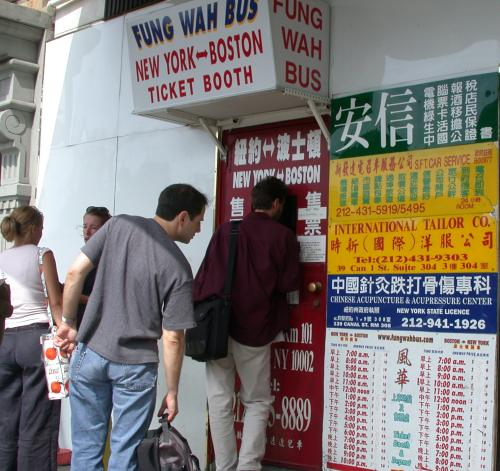
Passengers at the ticket window of Fung Wah Bus, one of several Chinatown bus companies

New York City has many forms of semi-formal and informal public transportation. Dollar vans in the New York metropolitan area serve major areas in Brooklyn, Queens, and the Bronx that lack adequate subway service. They pick up and drop off anywhere along a route, and payment is made at the end of a trip.

Similar to dollar vans, Chinese vans serve predominantly Chinese communities in Chinatown; Flushing; Sunset Park, and Elmhurst.

Jitney buses also provide transport to parts of Hudson County and Bergen County in New Jersey. Of particular note is the frequent Interstate express service offered along New Jersey Route 4 between the George Washington Bridge Bus Terminal and Paterson, New Jersey, provided by Spanish Transportation.

Highly competitive Chinatown bus lines operate routes from New York City's Chinatowns to other Chinatowns in the Northeast, with frequent service to major cities, including Boston, Philadelphia, and Washington, D.C. These companies use full-size coaches and offer fares much lower than traditional carriers like Greyhound and Coach USA, who in turn have gone after the Chinatown carriers by offering online fares as low as $1 on BoltBus, NeOn, and Megabus services.

== Airports ==
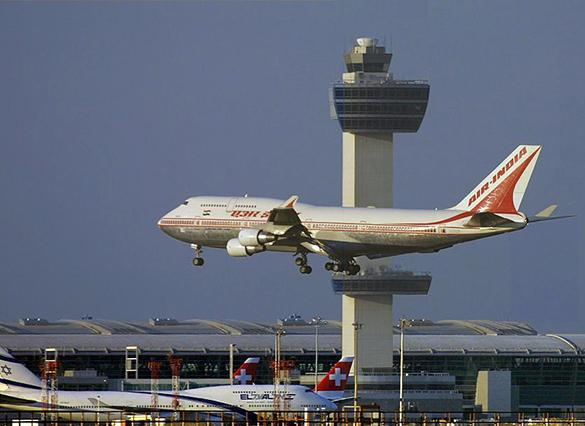
An Air India Boeing 747-400 arrives at JFK International Airport with El Al and Swiss International jets at Terminal 4; JFK International Airport is the largest point of entry for international arrivals to both the United States and the Americas.

New York City is the top international air passenger gateway to the United States. New York is the busiest air gateway in the nation. In 2011 more than 104 million passengers used the major airports serving the city, John F. Kennedy International (also known as JFK), Newark Liberty International, and LaGuardia. Teterboro serves as a primary general aviation airport. JFK and Newark both connect to regional rail systems by a light rail service.

JFK and Newark serve long-haul domestic and international flights. The two airports' outbound international travel accounted for about a quarter of all U.S. travelers who went overseas in 2004. LaGuardia caters to short-haul and domestic destinations.

JFK is the major entry point for international arrivals in the United States and is the largest international air freight gateway in the nation by value of shipments. About 100 airlines from more than 50 countries operate direct flights to JFK. The JFK-London Heathrow route is the leading U.S. international airport pair. The airport is located along Jamaica Bay near Howard Beach, Queens, about 12 miles (19 km) east of downtown Manhattan.

Newark was the first major airport serving New York City and is the fifth busiest international air gateway to the United States. Amelia Earhart dedicated the Newark Airport Administration Building in 1935, which was North America's first commercial airline terminal. In 2003, Newark became the terminus of the world's longest non-stop scheduled airline route, Continental's service to Hong Kong. In 2004, Singapore Airlines broke Continental's record by starting direct 18-hour flights from Newark to Singapore. The airport is located in Newark, New Jersey, about 12 miles (19 km) west of downtown Manhattan.

LaGuardia, the smallest of New York's primary airports, handles domestic flights. It is named for Fiorello H. LaGuardia, the city's great Depression-era mayor known as a reformist and strong supporter of the New Deal. A perimeter rule prohibits incoming and outgoing flights that exceed 1,500 miles (2,400 km) except on Saturdays, when the ban is lifted, and to Denver, which has a grandfathered exemption. As a result, most transcontinental and international flights use JFK and Newark. The airport is located in northern Queens about 6 miles (9.7 km) from downtown Manhattan. Plans were announced in July 2015 to entirely rebuild LaGuardia Airport in a multibillion-dollar project to replace its aging facilities.

Manhattan has three public heliports, used mostly by business travelers. A regularly scheduled helicopter service operates flights to JFK Airport from the Downtown Manhattan Heliport, located at the eastern end of Wall Street. There are also the East 34th Street Heliport and the West 30th Street Heliport.

== Seaport ==
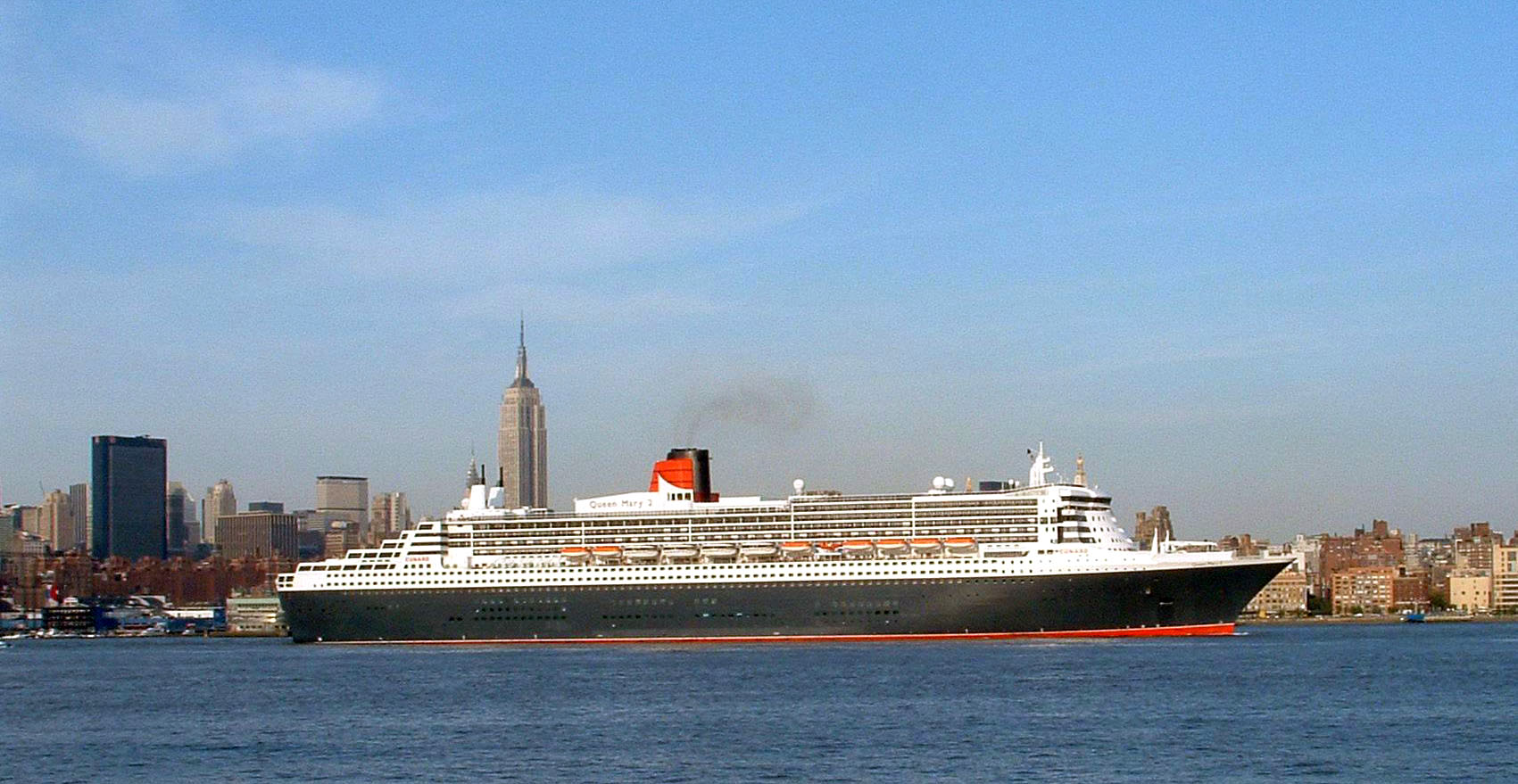
The Queen Mary 2, the world's second-largest passenger ship and largest ocean liner, departs Brooklyn Cruise Terminal on a transatlantic voyage

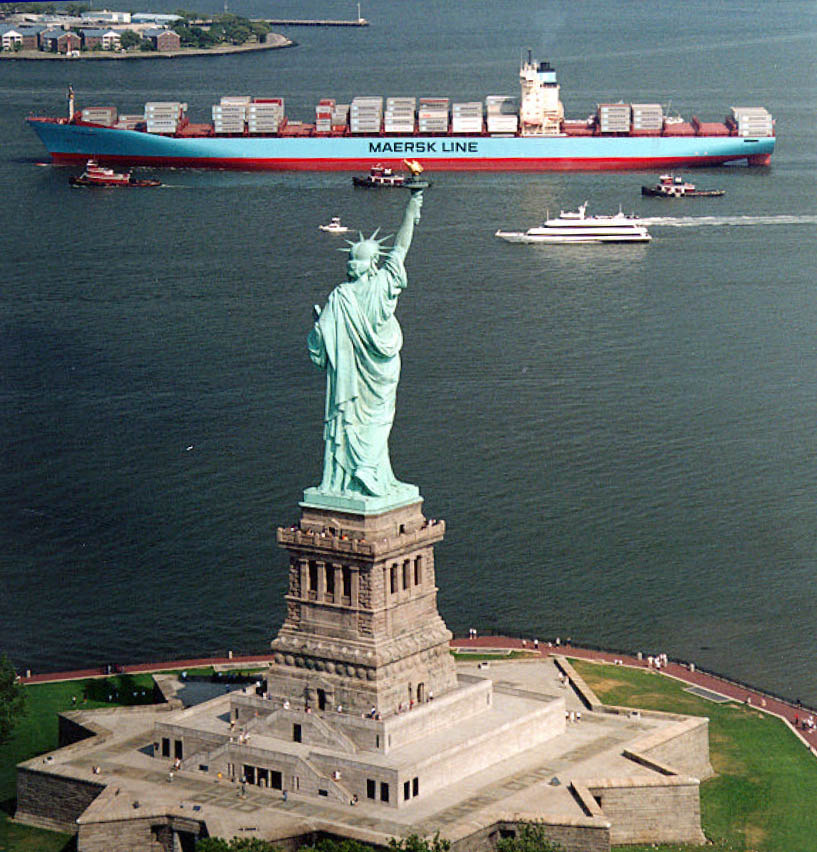
A lightly loaded container vessel transits the north end of Ambrose Channel in the Port of New York and New Jersey with the Statue of Liberty in the foreground

The Port of New York and New Jersey, with its natural advantages of deep water channels and protection from the Atlantic Ocean, has historically been one of the most important ports in the United States, and is now the third busiest in the United States behind South Louisiana and Houston, Texas in volume of cargo. In 2011, more than 34 million tons of oceanborne general cargo moved through the port. Bulk cargo represented another 52 million tons per year. Some 367,000 vehicles were imported and 284,000 were exported.

In 2005, more than 5,300 ships delivered to the port goods that went to 35% of the U.S. population. The port is experiencing rapid growth. Shipments increased 5.2% in 2011. There are three cargo terminals on the New York City side of the harbor, including the Howland Hook Marine Terminal on Staten Island, and the combined Red Hook Container Terminal/Brooklyn Marine Terminal. Several additional larger cargo terminals and a passenger terminal are on the New Jersey side.

Originally focused on Brooklyn's waterfront, especially at the Brooklyn Army Terminal in Sunset Park, most container ship cargo operations have shifted to the Port Newark-Elizabeth Marine Terminal on Newark Bay. The terminal, operated by the Port Authority of New York and New Jersey, is the largest port complex on the East Coast, with 4.3 million TEUs (twenty-foot equivalent units) of containerized cargo, which accounts for 61% of the North Atlantic container market. $208 billion of cargo passed through the Port of New York and New Jersey in 2011. The top five trading partners at the port are China, India, Italy, Germany, and Brazil.

The New York Harbor is also a major hub for passenger ships. More than half a million people depart annually from Manhattan's New York Passenger Ship Terminal on the Hudson River, accounting for five percent of the worldwide cruise industry and employing 21,000 residents in the city. The Queen Mary 2, the world's second-largest passenger ship and one of the few traditional ocean liners still in service, was designed specifically to fit under the Verrazzano Bridge, itself the longest suspension bridge in the United States. The Brooklyn Cruise Terminal is her regular port of call for transatlantic runs from Southampton, England. Cape Liberty Cruise Port in Bayonne is the third passenger terminal servicing the city.

Water quality in the New York Harbor improved dramatically in the late 20th century. New Yorkers regularly kayak and sail in the harbor, which has become a major recreational site for the city.

== Current and proposed expansion projects ==
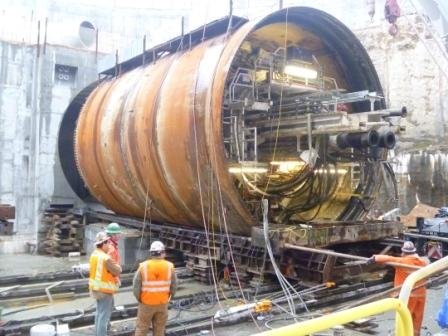
A tunnel boring machine for the new East Side Access tunnel

Several proposals for expanding the New York City transit system are in various stages of discussion, planning, initial funding, or construction. Some proposals will compete with others for available funding:

- The Second Avenue Subway, a north–south line first proposed in 1919, will run from 125th Street in East Harlem to Hanover Square in Lower Manhattan when completed. The first phase, from 63rd Street to 96th Street opened for passenger service on January 1, 2017.
- The East Side Access project routes some Long Island Rail Road trains to Grand Central Terminal instead of Penn Station. Since many LIRR commuters work on the east side of Manhattan, many in walking distance of Grand Central, this project saves travel time and reduces congestion at Penn Station and on subway routes connecting it with the east side. It also greatly expands the hourly capacity of the LIRR system. The project officially opened in January 2023.
- The Penn Station Access project will allow some Metro-North trains on the New Haven Line, and eventually the Hudson Line, to reach Penn Station. The first phase involves four new stops for the New Haven Line and is planned to open in 2027.
- The Gateway Project will add a second pair of railroad tracks under the Hudson River, connecting an expanded Penn Station to NJ Transit and Amtrak lines. This project is a successor to a similar one called Access to the Region's Core, which was canceled in October 2010 by New Jersey Governor Chris Christie. The project has been delayed due to a lack of funding, but, as of 2022, the tunnels under the East River were to be completed no earlier than 2035.
- Although New York City does not have light rail, a few proposals exist:
  - There is a proposal to convert 42nd Street into a light rail transit mall that would be closed to all vehicles except emergency vehicles. The original 1988 plan on which it is based included a loop east to Penn Station along 34th Street. Although a truncated 42nd Street light rail line was approved by the City Council in 1994, it stalled due to lack of funding and opposition from local communities worried about increased traffic. Once the city government proposed the 7 Subway Extension/IRT Flushing Line (7 and <7> trains), it lost interest in any light rail on 42nd Street.
  - Staten Island light rail proposals have found political support from Senator Charles Schumer and local political and business leaders.
  - Brooklyn Historic Railway Association has also proposed a light rail in Red Hook, Brooklyn, but that was judged to be infeasible and is largely made redundant by the Brooklyn Queens Connector.
  - The Brooklyn Queens Connector streetcar connecting Astoria, Queens and Sunset Park, Brooklyn was proposed by Mayor Bill de Blasio in February 2016, with construction planned to begin in 2019 and service around 2029.
  - The Interborough Express Light Rail Transit project is an initiative to introduce cross-borough light rail service along a grade-separated right-of-way from the Bay Ridge, Brooklyn to Jackson Heights, Queens. The Metropolitan Transportation Authority is conducting preliminary design and environmental review, and anticipates the project budget to be $5.5 billion (USD).
- John F. Kennedy International Airport is undergoing a US$10.3 billion redevelopment, one of the largest airport reconstruction projects in the world. In recent years, Terminals 1, 4, 5, and 8 have been reconstructed.
- Santiago Calatrava proposed an aerial gondola system, linking Manhattan, Governors Island, and Brooklyn, as part of the city's plans to develop the island.
- As part of a long-term plan to manage New York City's environmental sustainability, Mayor Michael Bloomberg released several proposals to increase mass transit usage and improve overall transportation infrastructure. Apart from support of the above capital projects, these proposals include the implementation of bus rapid transit, the reopening of closed LIRR and Metro-North stations, new ferry routes, better access for cyclists, pedestrians and intermodal transfers, and a congestion pricing zone for Manhattan south of 86th Street.

== See also ==
- Cycling in New York City
- New York City Department of Transportation
- List of U.S. cities with most pedestrian commuters
- Rail freight transportation in New York City and Long Island
- Plug-in electric vehicles in New York (state) § New York City
