= List of U.S. cities with high transit ridership =

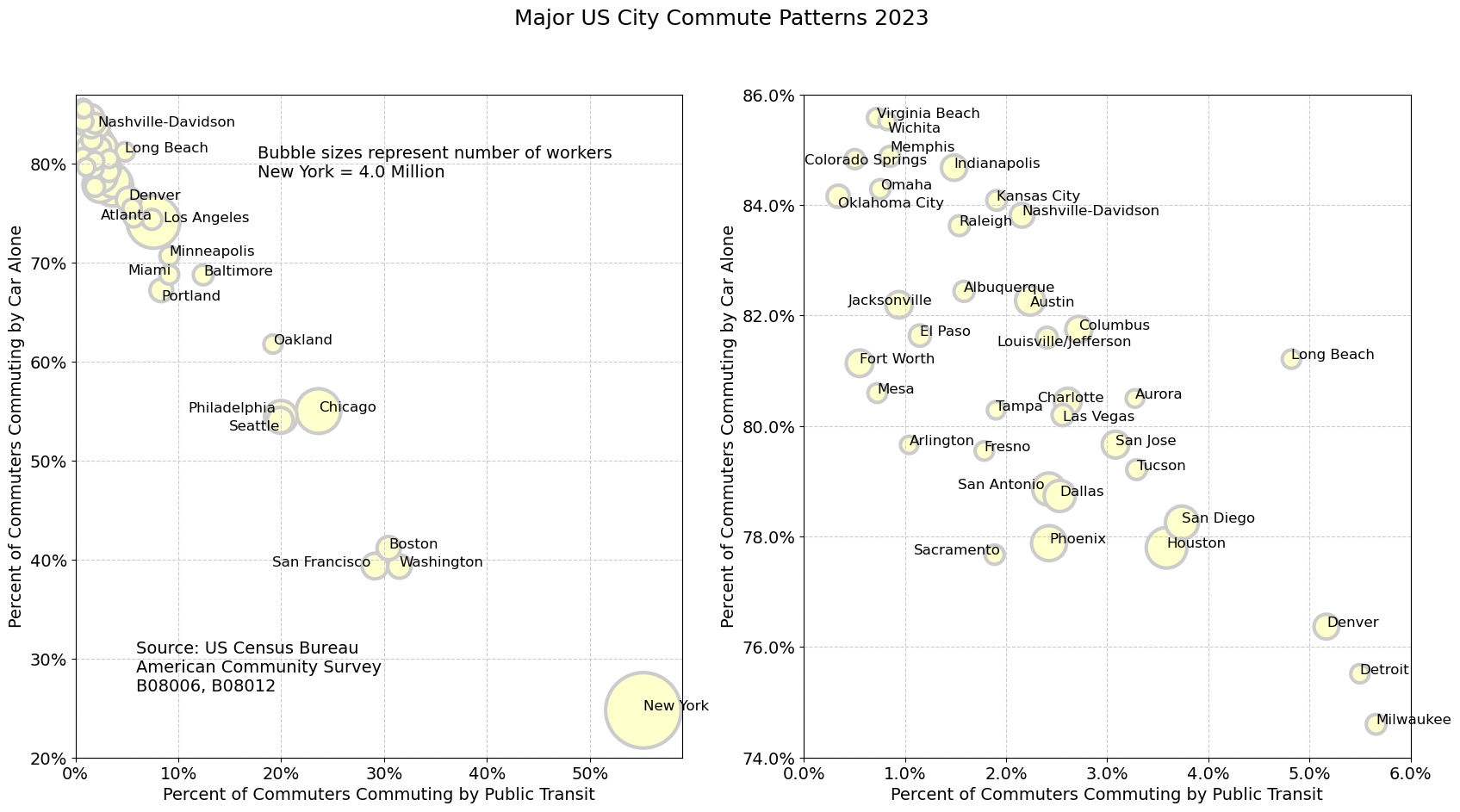
Percentage of public transport commuters in major U.S. cities in 2021

The following is a list of United States cities of 100,000+ inhabitants with the highest rates of public transit commuting to work, according to data from the American Community Survey. The table shows 2015 baseline data alongside the most recent 2024 estimates, ranked by 2024 percentage. The survey measured the percentage of commuters who take public transit, as opposed to walking, driving or riding in an automobile, bicycle, boat, or some other means.

Rank	City	Public transit commuters as % of population (2015)	Public transit commuters as % of population (2024)
1	New York City, New York	56.5%	48.7%
2	Jersey City, New Jersey	47.6%	45.1%
3	Mount Vernon, New York	—N/a	28.4%
4	Washington, D.C.	37.4%	26.6%
5	Somerville, Massachusetts	—N/a	26.1%
6	Boston, Massachusetts	33.7%	25.3%
7	San Francisco, California	33.1%	25.0%
8	Newark, New Jersey	26.7%	23.4%
9	Bayonne, New Jersey	—N/a	23.0%
10	Yonkers, New York	26.4%	22.7%
11	Malden, Massachusetts	—N/a	21.0%
12	Chicago, Illinois	27.6%	20.5%
13	Quincy, Massachusetts	—N/a	20.5%
14	Philadelphia, Pennsylvania	26.2%	20.1%
15	Arlington, Virginia	26.4%	19.5%
16	Cambridge, Massachusetts	28.6%	19.2%
17	East Orange, New Jersey	—N/a	19.0%
18	Hartford, Connecticut	16.6%	16.0%
19	Oakland, California	20.3%	15.5%
20	Lynn, Massachusetts	—N/a	15.4%
21	Seattle, Washington	20.1%	15.0%
22	Evanston, Illinois	—N/a	14.8%
23	Alexandria, Virginia	21.7%	14.4%
24	Berkeley, California	21.6%	14.2%
25	Pittsburgh, Pennsylvania	17.0%	13.8%
26	Passaic, New Jersey	—N/a	13.3%
27	Daly City, California	19.8%	13.2%
28	Alameda, California	—N/a	11.2%
29	Elizabeth, New Jersey	11.3%	10.1%
30	Baltimore, Maryland	18.6%	9.7%
31	Norwalk, Connecticut	—N/a	9.7%
32	Newton, Massachusetts	—N/a	9.5%
33	Honolulu, Hawaii	8.4%	8.2%
34	Richmond, California	14.0%	8.0%
35	St. Louis, Missouri	9.4%	7.9%
36	New Haven, Connecticut	13.3%	7.8%
37	Miami, Florida	11.4%	7.7%
38	Bellevue, Washington	11.8%	7.7%
39	Bridgeport, Connecticut	10.8%	7.6%
40	Paterson, New Jersey	11.9%	7.6%
41	Madison, Wisconsin	9.3%	7.6%
42	Buffalo, New York	11.7%	7.4%
43	East Los Angeles, California	10.9%	7.2%
44	Cleveland, Ohio	10.5%	7.2%
45	Minneapolis, Minnesota	13.1%	7.1%
46	Portland, Oregon	12.1%	7.1%
47	Naperville, Illinois	9.7%	6.9%
48	Gresham, Oregon	8.2%	6.6%
49	Providence, Rhode Island	8.3%	6.4%
50	Los Angeles, California	10.6%	6.2%
51	Atlanta, Georgia	9.8%	5.7%
52	St. Paul, Minnesota	8.5%	5.7%
53	Fremont, California	9.0%	5.5%
54	Milwaukee, Wisconsin	8.6%	5.4%
55	Rochester, New York	8.8%	5.2%
56	New Orleans, Louisiana	7.8%	4.1%
57	Cincinnati, Ohio	7.8%	3.9%
58	San Juan, Puerto Rico	8.7%	3.7%
—	Stamford, Connecticut	14.1%	—N/a
—	Edison, New Jersey	13.4%	—N/a
—	Ann Arbor, Michigan	11.2%	—N/a
—	Concord, California	10.0%	—N/a

== See also ==
- List of U.S. cities with most pedestrian commuters
- List of U.S. cities with most bicycle commuters
- Transportation in the United States
- List of United States rapid transit systems by ridership
- List of United States light rail systems by ridership
- List of United States local bus agencies by ridership
- List of United States commuter rail systems by ridership
- Modal share

== Sources ==
- 2024 American Community Survey 1-year estimates, Table B08301
- 2015 American Community Survey 5-year estimates
- US Census
- Carfree Census Database
