= List of U.S. cities with most bicycle commuters =

The following is a list of United States incorporated places with at least 5,000 workers with the 25 highest rates of bicycle commuting (bicycle mode share), according to data from the 2019 American Community Survey, 5 year average. The Census Bureau, through the American Community Survey, measured the percentage of commuters who bike to work, as opposed to walking, taking public transit, driving an automobile, boat, or some other means.

Rank	City	Bicycle commuters as % of population (2019)
1	Davis, California	17.48%
2	Key West, Florida	15.29%
3	Corvallis, Oregon	11.10%
4	Boulder, Colorado	9.88%
5	Palo Alto, California	9.19%
6	Mammoth Lakes, California	9.10%
7	Aspen, Colorado	8.39%
8	Durango, Colorado	8.06%
9	Cambridge, Massachusetts	7.68%
10	Menlo Park, California	7.67%
11	Santa Cruz, California	7.58%
12	San Luis Obispo, California	7.57%
13	Somerville, Massachusetts	7.14%
14	Berkeley, California	7.12%
15	East Lansing, Michigan	7.01%
16	Steamboat Springs, Colorado	6.90%
17	Mountain View, California	6.70%
18	Albany, California	6.66%
19	Missoula, Montana	6.15%
20	Portland, Oregon	5.99%
21	Urbana, Illinois	5.96%
22	Coronado, California	5.67%
23	Eugene, Oregon	5.62%
24	Burlington, Vermont	5.54%
25	Miami Beach, Florida	5.52%

== See also ==
- List of U.S. cities with most pedestrian commuters
- List of U.S. cities with high transit ridership
- Modal Share
