= List of U.S. cities with most pedestrian commuters =

The following is a list of United States incorporated places with at least 5,000 workers with the 25 highest rates of pedestrian commuting (walking to work) (pedestrian mode share), according to data from the 2019 American Community Survey, five-year average. The Census Bureau, through the American Community Survey, measured the percentage of commuters who walk to work, as opposed to bicycling, taking public transit, driving an automobile, boat, or some other means.

Rank	City	Pedestrian commuters as % of population (2019)
1	Ithaca, New York	36.12%
2	State College, Pennsylvania	33.77%
3	Athens, Ohio	32.12%
4	North Chicago, Illinois	28.75%
5	West Lafayette, Indiana	24.74%
6	Cambridge, Massachusetts	24.24%
7	Oneonta, New York	22.56%
8	Oxford, Ohio	22.56%
9	Burlington, Vermont	22.21%
10	Columbia, South Carolina	21.86%
11	Pullman, Washington	20.94%
12	Bremerton, Washington	19.56%
13	College Park, Maryland	19.33%
14	Meadville, Pennsylvania	19.27%
15	Moscow, Idaho	18.91%
16	East Lansing, Michigan	18.76%
17	Atlantic City, New Jersey	18.55%
18	Indiana, Pennsylvania	18.22%
19	Whitewater, Wisconsin	17.27%
20	Morgantown, West Virginia	17.23%
21	Ellensburg, Washington	17.16%
22	Twentynine Palms, California	16.88%
23	Arcata, California	16.56%
24	Berkeley, California	16.54%
25	Ann Arbor, Michigan	16.52%

== See also ==
- List of U.S. cities with most bicycle commuters
- List of U.S. cities with high transit ridership
