= Adirondack =

Adirondack may refer to:

== Places ==
- Adirondack Mountains, New York, US
  - Adirondack Park, a protected area in the US, containing a large portion of the Adirondack Mountains
- Adirondack County, New York, a proposed county in New York
- Adirondack, New York, a place in New York

== Transport ==
- Adirondack (train), an Amtrak passenger rail route connecting New York City and Montreal
- Adirondack guideboat, a rowed skiff, built to be carried between bodies of water, originally designed for hunting
- USS Adirondack (1862), a gunboat during the American Civil War that sank off the Bahamas
- USS Adirondack (YT-44), an iron-hulled screw tug originally known as the Underwriter
- USS Adirondack (ID-1270), commissioned into the Navy in 1917 and used as a floating barracks until 1919
- USS Adirondack (AGC-15), an amphibious force flagship in service from 1945 to 1955

== Other uses ==
- Adirondack (Mars), Mars Exploration Rover Spirit's first target rock for investigation
- Adirondack Architecture, an American style of construction
- Adirondack Beverages, a soft drink company based in New York state, that produces the Adirondack brand sodas
- Adirondack Canoe Classic, a three-day, 90-mile (140 km) canoe race from Old Forge to Saranac Lake (also known as the "90-miler")
- Adirondack chair, a type of chair used primarily in an outdoors setting
- Adirondack Community College (US), a two-year college located in the state of New York
- Adirondack Experience, a museum
- Adirondack Flames, former American Hockey League team (2014–15)
- Adirondack Great Camps
- Adirondack Phantoms, former American Hockey League team (2009–2014)
- Adirondack Red Wings, former American Hockey League team (1979–1999)
- Adirondack shelter, a style of lean-to
- Picea rubens or Adirondack, a species of spruce tree used to make musical instruments
