= USS Adirondack =

USS Adirondack may refer to the following ships of the United States Navy:

- USS Adirondack (1862), was a gunboat during the American Civil War that sank off the Bahamas
- USS Adirondack (YT-44), was an iron-hulled screw tugboat originally known as Underwriter.
- USS Adirondack (ID-1270), was commissioned into the Navy in 1917 and used as a floating barracks until 1919.
- USS Adirondack (AGC-15), was an amphibious force flagship in service from 1945 to 1955.
