= PS Alexander Hamilton =

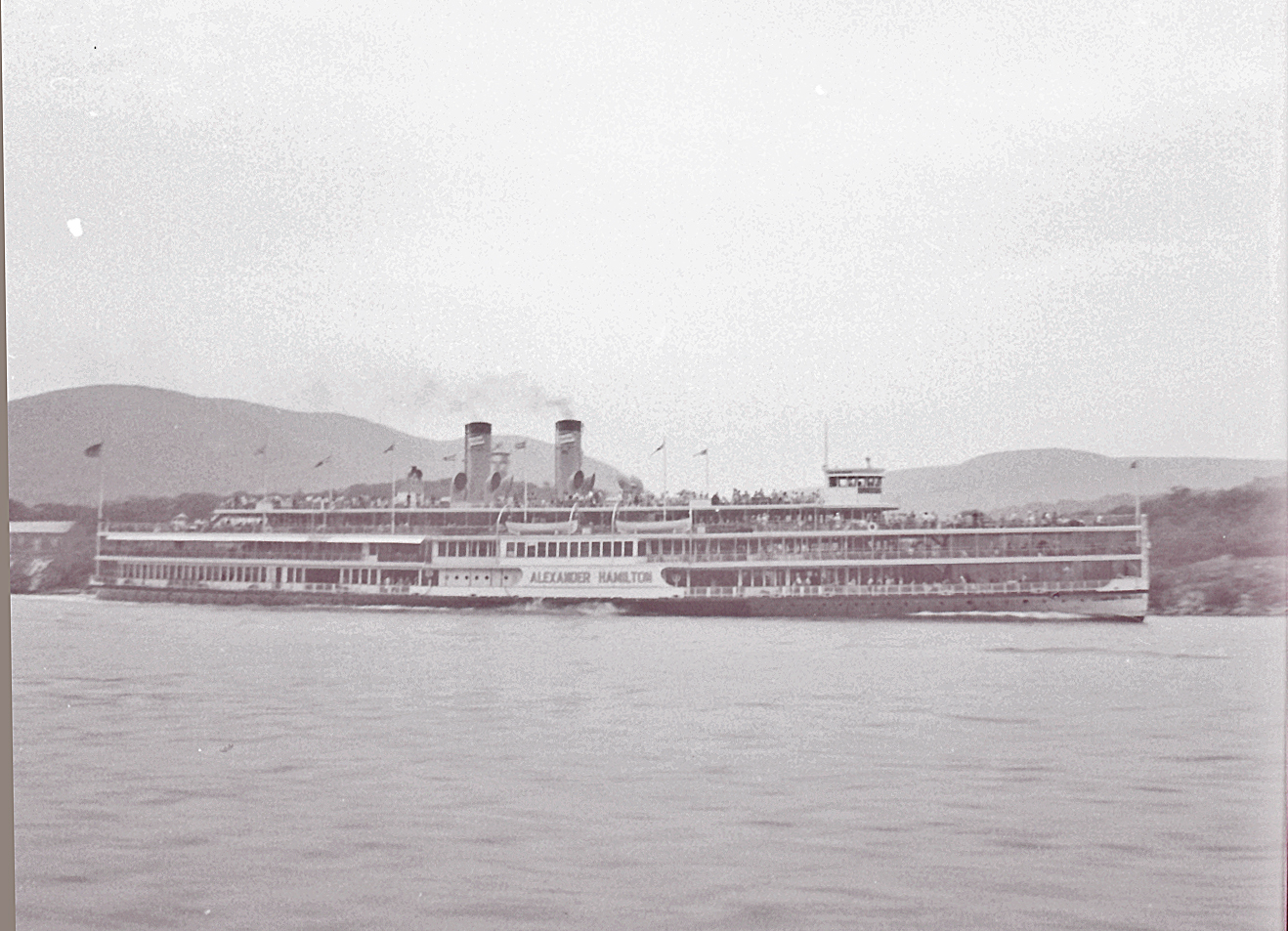
- PS Alexander Hamilton on the Hudson River, 1933

History

United States
- Name: Alexander Hamilton
- Owner: Hudson River Day Line
- Operator: Hudson River Day Line 1924-1960; Circle Line 1960-1971
- Route: Hudson River between New York City and Albany, New York (until 1948)
- Builder: Bethlehem Shipbuilding Corporation
- In service: 1924
- Out of service: 1971
- Identification: U.S. registry #223775
- Fate: Burned and sank 8 November 1977
- Notes: Ruins still partially visible however wreckage is within the security region of Naval Weapons Station Earle

General characteristics
- Type: Passenger steamboat
- Tonnage: 2,367 GRT; 1,252 NRT
- Length: 349 ft 5 in (106.50 m)
- Beam: 77 ft (23 m)
- Draft: 8 ft 4 in (2.54 m)
- Decks: 4 total, 3 complete and 1 partial
- Installed power: Four Scotch marine boilers
- Propulsion: Incline triple expansion engine
- Capacity: 3,000
- PS Alexander Hamilton
- U.S. National Register of Historic Places
- New Jersey Register of Historic Places
- Location within Monmouth County, New Jersey
- Location: near Naval Weapons Station Earle; Middletown, New Jersey
- Coordinates: 40°26′22.97″N 74°03′34.09″W
- Built: 1924
- Architect: Bethlehem Shipbuilding Corporation
- Demolished: November 8, 1977
- NRHP reference No.: 77000887
- NJRHP No.: 1960

Significant dates
- Added to NRHP: March 25, 1977
- Designated NJRHP: October 22, 1976

Alexander Hamilton was a steamer built for the Hudson River Day Line in 1924 and named after Founding Father Alexander Hamilton. It was added to the National Register of Historic Places on March 25, 1977. The remains of the vessel are located adjacent to the Naval Weapons Station Earle pier in Middletown Township, Monmouth County, New Jersey, United States.

== History ==
The Hudson River Day Line used Alexander Hamilton to transport passengers along the Hudson River between New York City and Albany, New York. In her later years, the run was shortened to a turnaround in Poughkeepsie. The steamer was built by Bethlehem Sparrows Point Shipyard, Sparrows Point, Maryland, in 1924. The steamer operated from 1924 to 1971, first running with other Day Line Steamers, including the Peter Stuyvesant until the 1960s, when the company was purchased by the Circle Line, and became a one boat operation. She was over 300 feet in length and was built to handle more than 3,000 passengers. Her replacement was the passenger vessel Dayliner, which took over the run. Alexander Hamilton spent time at the South Street Seaport and Brooklyn Navy Yard before being moved to Atlantic Highlands, New Jersey. In 1977, the Alexander Hamilton was moved to a temporary berth along the east side of the Navy pier in Middletown Township. During a storm, she caught fire and sank next to the pier on November 8, 1977.

== Design ==
The steamer's propulsion system consisted of four Scotch marine boilers delivering steam to an inclined triple expansion engine that turned a crankshaft attached to feathering paddle-wheels on the port and starboard sides. She was the last of the great Day Line "side-wheelers", and the last of her kind to ply the Hudson River.

== See also ==
- National Register of Historic Places listings in Monmouth County, New Jersey
- PS Washington Irving - another Hudson River Day Line steamboat.
