= USS Alpaco =

United States Navy vessel

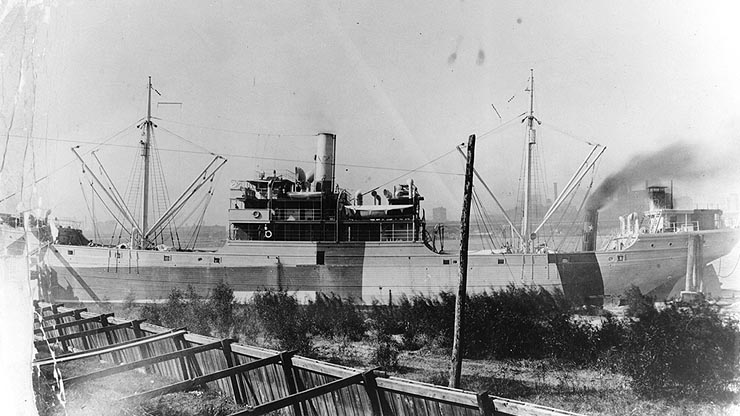
- USS Alpaco in port in late 1918.

History

United States
- Name: USS Alpaco
- Namesake: Previous name retained
- Builder: Hodge Shipbuilding Company, Moss Point, Mississippi
- Launched: 4 July 1918
- Completed: 1918
- Acquired: 18 November 1918
- Commissioned: 18 November 1918
- Decommissioned: 19 December 1918
- Stricken: 20 January 1919
- Fate: Transferred to United States Shipping Board 19 December 1918; scrapped by mid-1924; Abandoned at Mallows Bay
- Notes: Under U.S. Shipping Board control as SS Alpaco 1918–1924

General characteristics
- Type: Cargo ship
- Tonnage: 2,500 Gross register tons
- Length: 268 ft 0 in (81.69 m)
- Beam: 45 ft 2 in (13.77 m)
- Draft: 23 ft 6 in (7.16 m) mean
- Propulsion: Steam engine
- Speed: 10 knots
- Complement: 57
- Armament: None

USS Alpaco was a Design 1001 ship that served in the United States Navy from November to December 1918.

SS Alpaco was built in 1918 as a wooden-hulled commercial cargo ship by the Hodge Shipbuilding Company at Moss Point, Mississippi, for the United States Shipping Board. Upon completion, she was transferred to the U.S. Navy, which took possession of her on 18 November 1918 and commissioned her the same day as USS Alpaco at the Navy Yard Dock in New Orleans, Louisiana. She was never given a naval registry identification number, but was assigned to the Naval Overseas Transportation Service and earmarked for coastwise service.

The Navy conducted sea trials of Alpaco on 3 December 1918 with representatives of Hodge Shipbuilding on board. She was unable to maintain maximum revolutions for her engines, and a fire broke out in a coal bunker that took a little over 45 minutes to extinguish, the firefighters having to rip off the galvanized sheet iron from the engine room bulkhead to enable them to use their hoses to better advantage. Alpaco had to be assisted back into her berth by the tug USS Underwriter.

Condemned as "unseaworthy" after this fiasco, Alpaco remained pierside at her berth until decommissioned there on 19 December 1918 and simultaneously returned to the U.S. Shipping Board. As SS Alpaco, she remained in the Shipping Board's hands until she was scrapped by mid-1924 by the Western Marine & Salvage. Her hulk was towed to Mallows Bay, Alpaco was burned and remained where she was. Today, the wreck of SS Alpaco lays at 38°28′27.3″N 77°16′09.5″W. She rests on her keel. The hull is overgrown with vegetation and is partially underwater.
