= Circle Line Downtown =

American harbor cruise company

- Locale: Manhattan, New York
- Waterway: Buttermilk Channel, East River, Erie Basin, Haverstraw Bay, Kill Van Kull, Hudson River, New York Harbor, Upper New York Bay
- Transit type: Water Tours
- Owner: Douglas Durst; Tom Fox
- Operator: Circle Line Downtown (New York Water Taxi)
- Began operation: 1981
- No. of lines: 5
- No. of vessels: 2
- No. of terminals: 1

Circle Line Downtown is a sightseeing harbor cruise company that operates out of the South Street Seaport Pavilion Pier at the Financial District in Manhattan under Harbor Experience Companies.

== History ==
Circle Line Downtown was established by President J.B. Meyer, third generation owner and operator of the family that founded the company and Circle Line Sightseeing Cruises brand. In 1953, Frank Barry, Gerald O'Driscoll, Helen Mitchell, William Moran, and Frank Clair founded Circle Line, the nautical sightseeing operation, providing cruises which circled Manhattan. The company's fleet was then a collection of modified craft, including surplus landing crafts from World War II, retired Coast Guard cutters, and private yachts.

Operating as Circle Line-Statue of Liberty Ferry, Inc., this offshoot was contracted by the United States Department of Interior National Park Service to provide exclusive ferry service to both Liberty Island and Ellis Island in 1954.

In 1982, the company collectively known as Circle Line split into two separate entities, Circle Line Sightseeing at 42nd Street and Circle Line-Statue of Liberty Ferry, Inc. Meyer and Moran soon came to head Statue of Liberty Ferry. Operating out of Battery Park, Circle Line-Statue of Liberty Ferry, Inc. ran service to Liberty and Ellis Islands until 2008, when the franchise was awarded to Statue Cruises.

After the September 11, 2001 attacks, Meyer and Moran, sought to lend a hand in the revitalization of lower Manhattan. The two founded Circle Line Harbor Cruises, LLC., known in the global tourism community as Circle Line Downtown in 2004.

On November 3, 2008 New York Water Taxi announced that they had purchased Circle Line Downtown.

In January 2017, Circle Line Sightseeing Cruises purchased New York Water Taxi and the Circle Line Downtown brand, reuniting both Circle Lines under one owner.

== Cruises ==
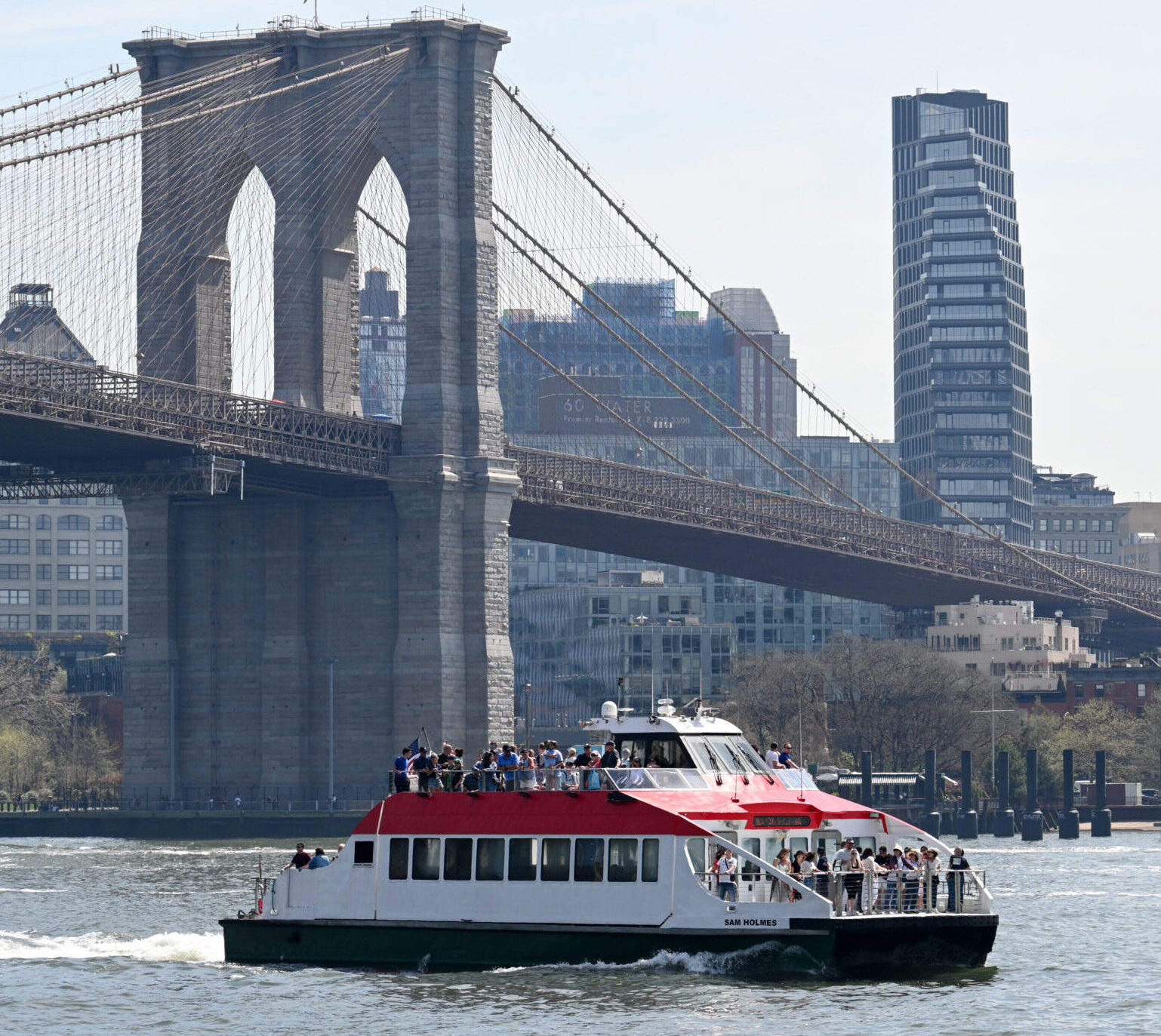
Circle Line Downtown Boat on the East River

Circle Line Downtown operates sightseeing cruises that sails past many New York landmarks including the Statue of Liberty, Ellis Island Immigration Museum, the One World Trade Center Freedom Tower, the Brooklyn Bridge, the Empire State Building and the Chrysler Building, in addition to the Shark Speedboat and other seasonal cruises.
