= W. & A. Fletcher Company =

American manufacturer

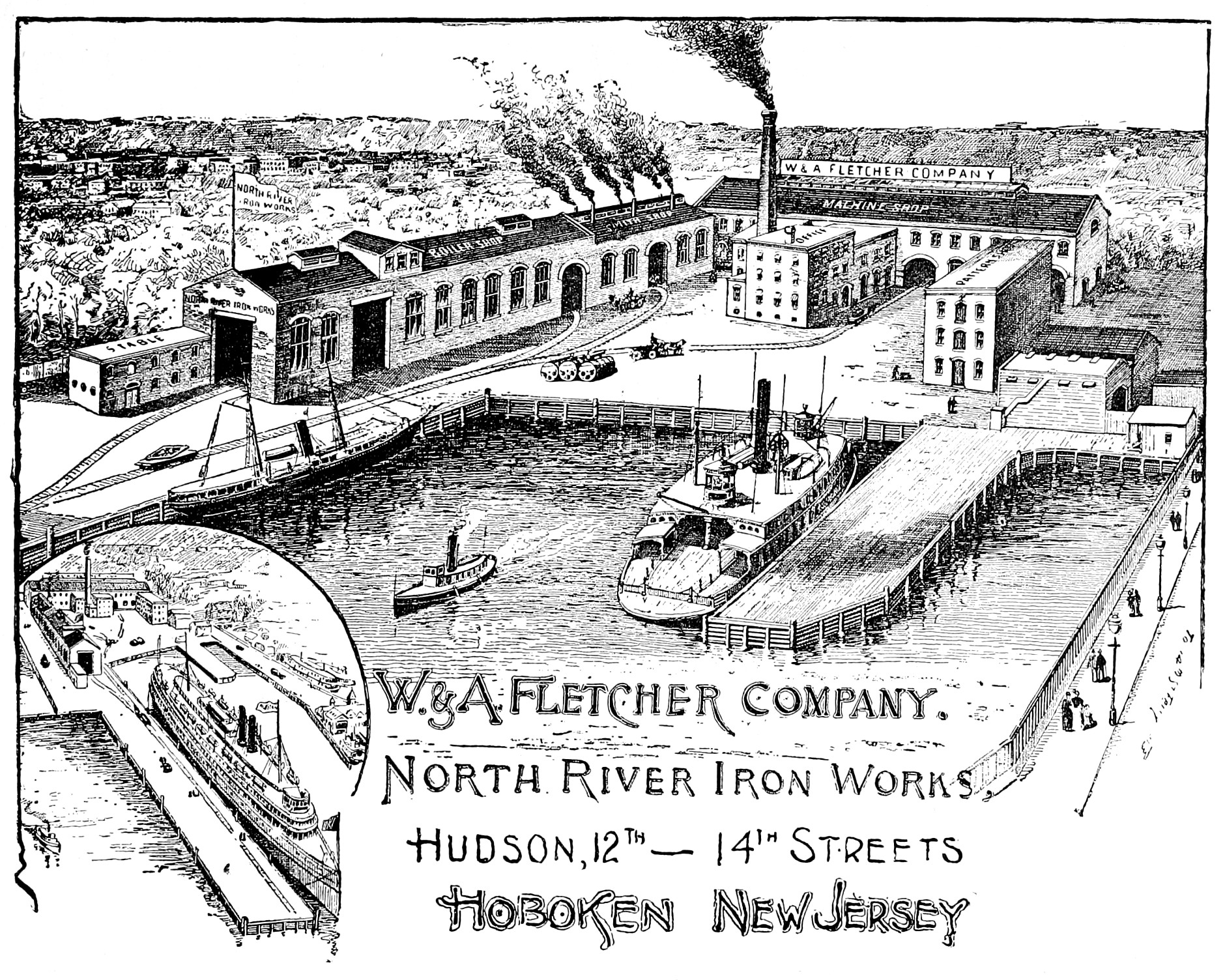
The W. & A. Fletcher Company in 1893—image from a company advertisement

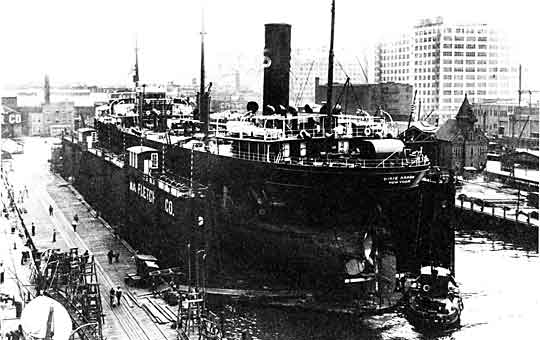
The oil tanker SS Dixie Arrow in the W. & A. Fletcher Company drydock

W. & A. Fletcher Co. was an American manufacturer of marine boilers and steam engines for steamboats on the Hudson, in the Great Lakes, Long Island Sound, and elsewhere in the late 19th and early 20th centuries. The company was founded in 1853 and associated with development of steam powered ships from the original crude efforts.

Originally Fletcher, Harrison & Co., the company was located on Hudson Street in Hoboken, New Jersey. They built engines for many famous Hudson River Day Line steamers and others, in both vertical walking beam and inclined compound types. In some cases the company held the contract for a vessel's construction and sublet the hull and joiner work to other companies as in the case of the large steamer Berkshire for the Hudson Navigation Company in which the hull was sublet to New York Shipbuilding Company of Camden, New Jersey and joiner work to Charles M. Englis. As in the case with PS Washington Irving the company held the engine contract and, as with the J. P. Morgan yacht Corsair III did the installation after the launch of the hull.

Some of the ships they fabricated engines for included PS General Slocum, USS Hendrick Hudson, USS Adirondack and Shady Side. They also built the engine for the first turbine-propelled commercial ship built in the United States, SS Governor Cobb in 1906. The Fletcher Yard constructed the turbines under license from Parsons of England.

By 1921 the company had been associated with over 320 vessels ranging from tugs to ocean going ships and had operations to a repair yard with a 440 feet (134.1 m) floating dry dock. Competing with other yards W. & A. Fletcher won the bids for 21 of 56 vessels that were converted to Army transports.

W. & A. Fletcher Co. was merged with five other New York-based shipbuilding/ship repair companies to form United Dry Docks, Inc. in February 1929.

In 1938, the Hoboken Shipyard was sold to Bethlehem Shipbuilding Corporation. The shipyard was closed in 1982.
