= Circle Line Sightseeing Cruises =

American sightseeing and entertainment company

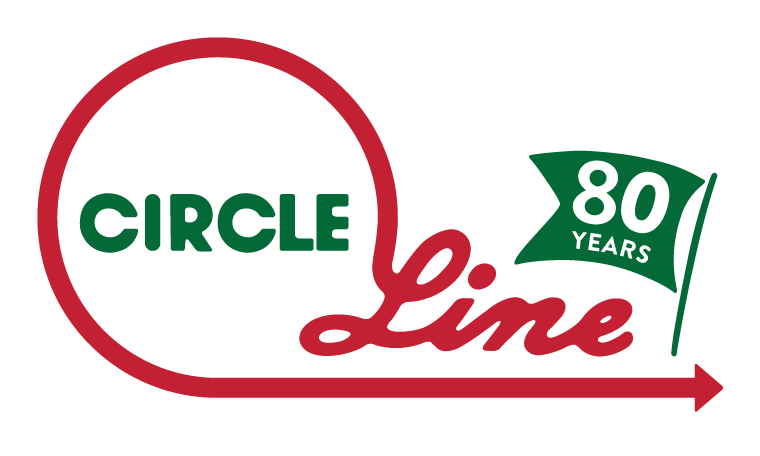

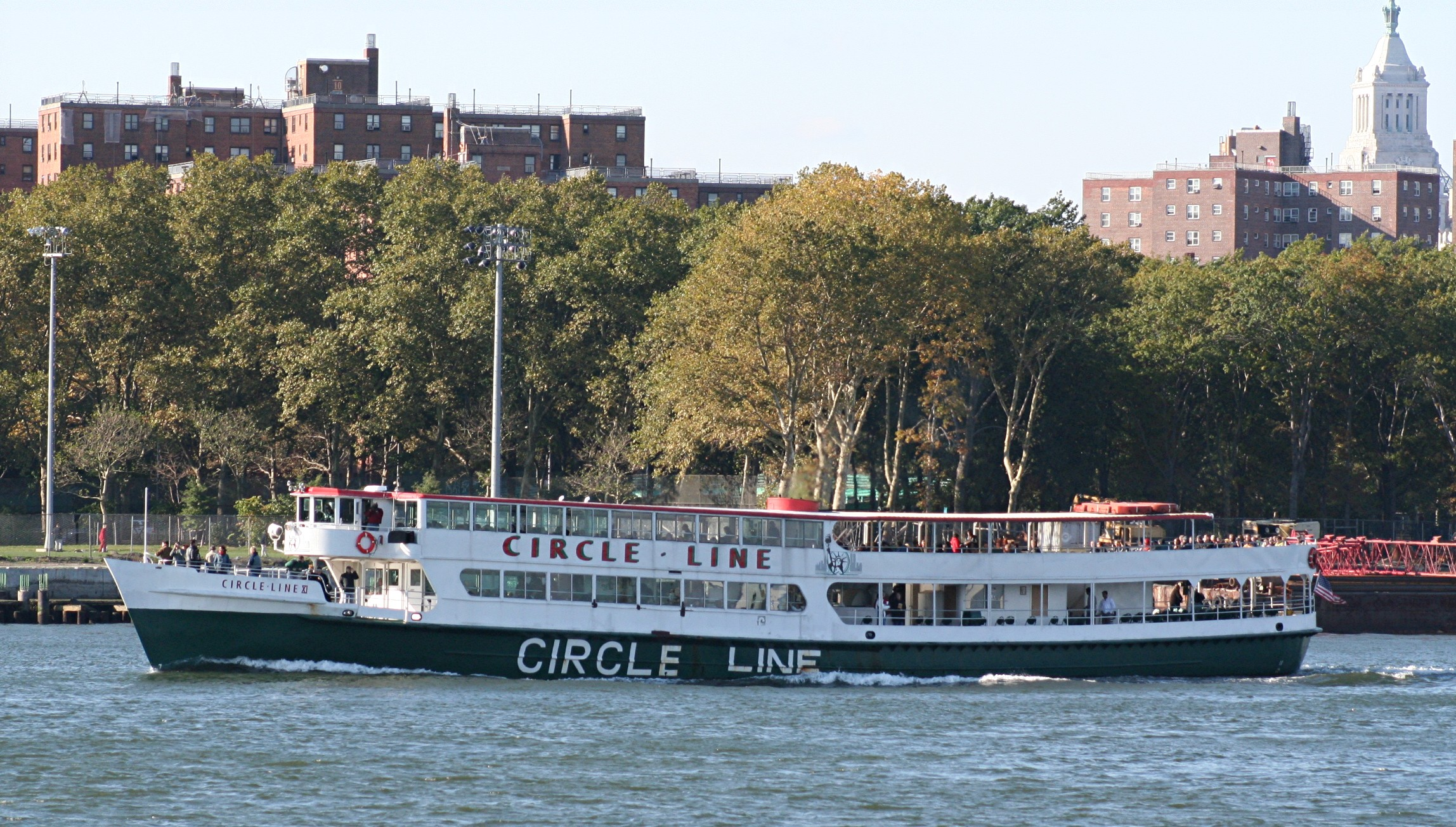
- The now-retired Circle Line X
- Locale: Manhattan, New York
- Waterway: East River, Harlem River, Harlem River Ship Canal, Hudson River, New York Harbor, Spuyten Duyvil Creek, Upper New York Bay
- Transit type: Water Tours, Charter Yachts, Tourist Attractions
- Owner: New York Cruise Lines
- Began operation: 1945
- Website: https://www.circleline.com

Circle Line Sightseeing Cruises is a boat-based sightseeing and entertainment company in Manhattan, New York. Its principal business is operating guided tours of New York City from its base at Pier 83 in the Hell's Kitchen neighborhood.

== History ==
Circumnavigation of Manhattan became possible in 1905 with the construction of the Harlem Ship Canal, the first regularly scheduled trip being the Tourist captained by John Roberts in 1908.

On June 15, 1945, Frank Barry, Joe Moran and other partners merged several companies to form Circle-Line Sightseeing Yachts, offering boat tours of New York operating out of Battery Park.

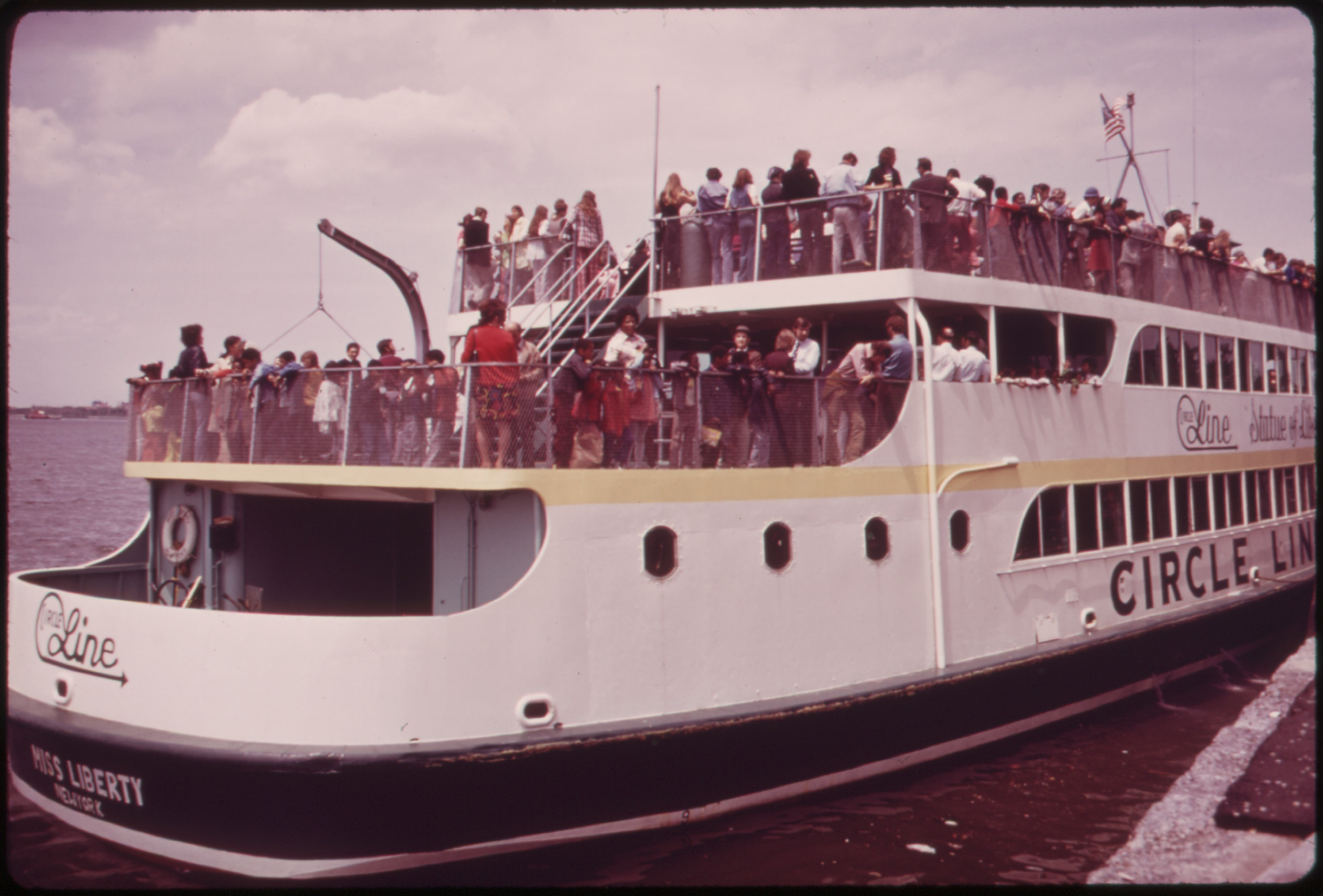
Miss Liberty, 1973. Photo by Arthur Tress.

Old Circle Line Sightseeing Logo

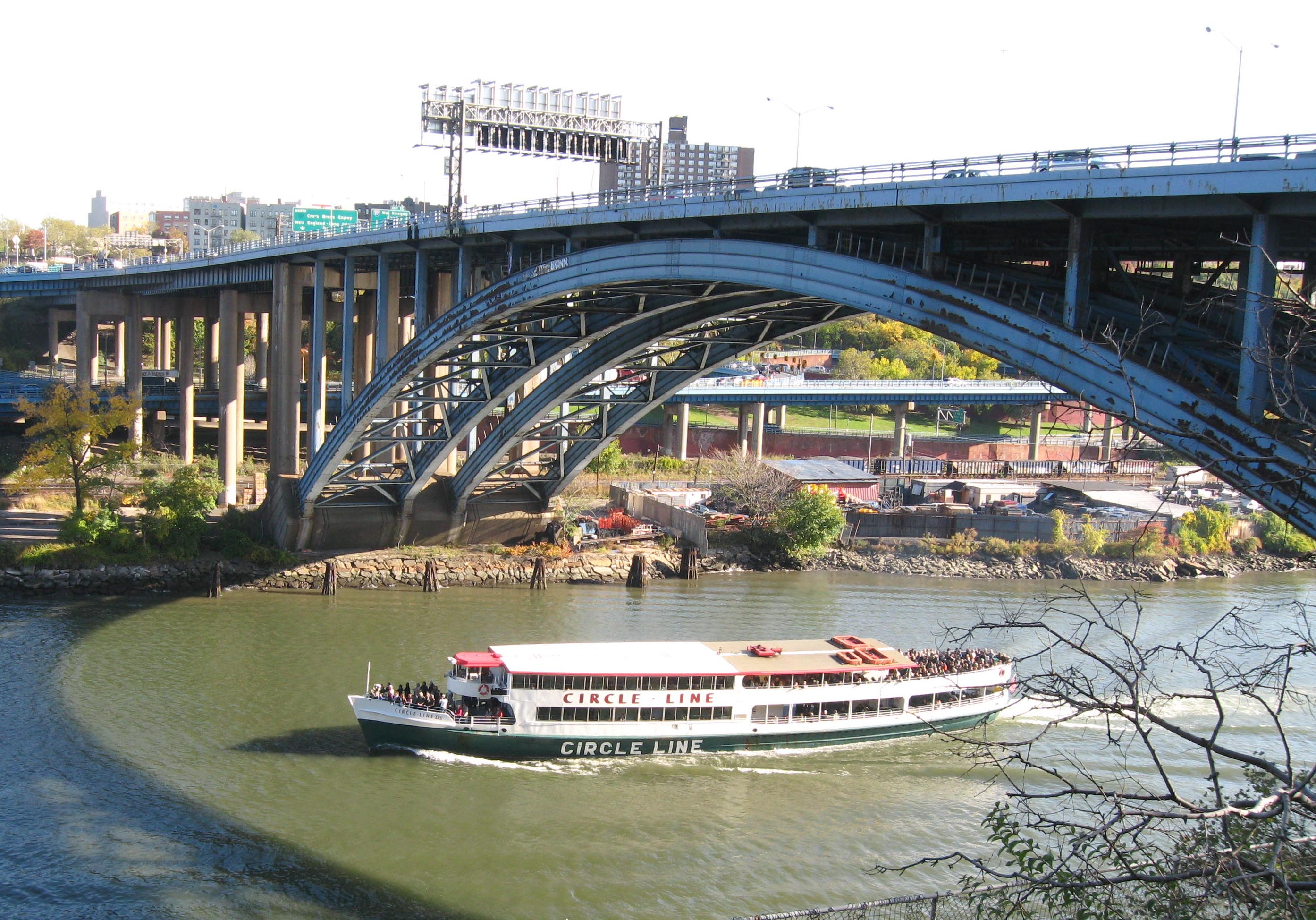
The Circle Line XVII touring the Harlem River

In June 1954 Circle Line took delivery of Miss Liberty a new 460-ton excursion steamer. The three-deck vessel could carry up to 750 passengers. Veteran captain George Clancy was skipper of the boat for many years and although he spent decades with the sightseeing company, and made more than 40,000 trips between lower Manhattan and Bledsoe's Island, he never went inside the statue. Miss Liberty was acquired by Circle Line because of growing popularity of The Statue of Liberty as a tourist destination. It was the first excursion steamer of its type to be built in the United States since 1929.

In 1955, it began operating at Pier 83 in Midtown. In 1962, it bought the famous and venerable Hudson River Day Line. The steamboats of the Hudson River Day Line remained in operation under Circle Line Sightseeing Cruises until 1971.

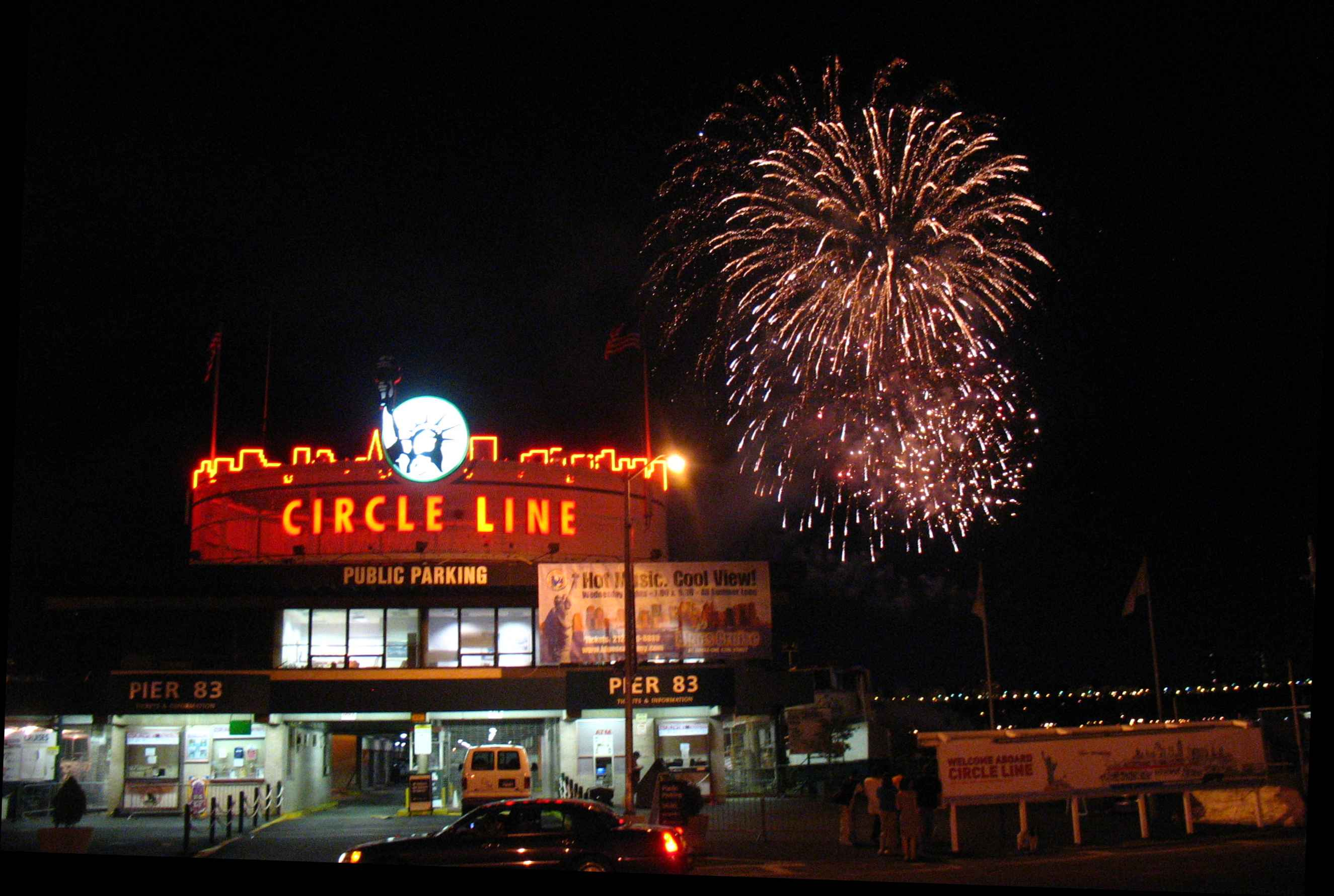
Fireworks at Pier 83 in 2006.

In 1981, the Circle Line split into two companies—Circle Line Sightseeing Cruises and Circle Line Downtown.

In 1988, the company bought World Yacht's operating upscale dining cruises from Chelsea Piers - currently World Yacht Dining Cruises. In 1998, the 42nd Street company also launched The Beast, a speedboat ride which takes tourists around the Statue of Liberty and goes 45 mph.

In 2007, the United States National Park Service said it was going to terminate Circle Line Liberty franchise and give a 10-year contract to Hornblower Cruises which provides service to Alcatraz. It was noted in the announcement that since 1953 Circle Line had transported 70 million people to Liberty Island. Among the items cited in the transfer was a newer fleet (although Hornblower would have to buy the Circle Line boats) and the possibility of new service to Gateway National Recreation Area. The New York Times reported on December 8, 2007, that the price of the Circle Line boats to be sold to Hornblower was in arbitration, forcing Hornblower to bring in new boats.

In 2009, Circle Line took delivery of the third of three new vessels constructed by Gladding-Hearn Shipbuilding in Somerset, Massachusetts.

In January 2017, Circle Line Sightseeing Cruises purchased New York Water Taxi—among the assets acquired was the latter company's Circle Line Downtown brand, reuniting both Circle Lines under one owner.

== Awards ==
Circle Line was awarded with proclamations by two New York City mayors. In 1985, then Mayor Ed Koch proclaimed April 23 "Circle Line Day." Approximately 20 years later current Mayor Mike Bloomberg proclaimed September 17 "Circle Line Sightseeing Cruises Day" in 2008.

== Rescue ==
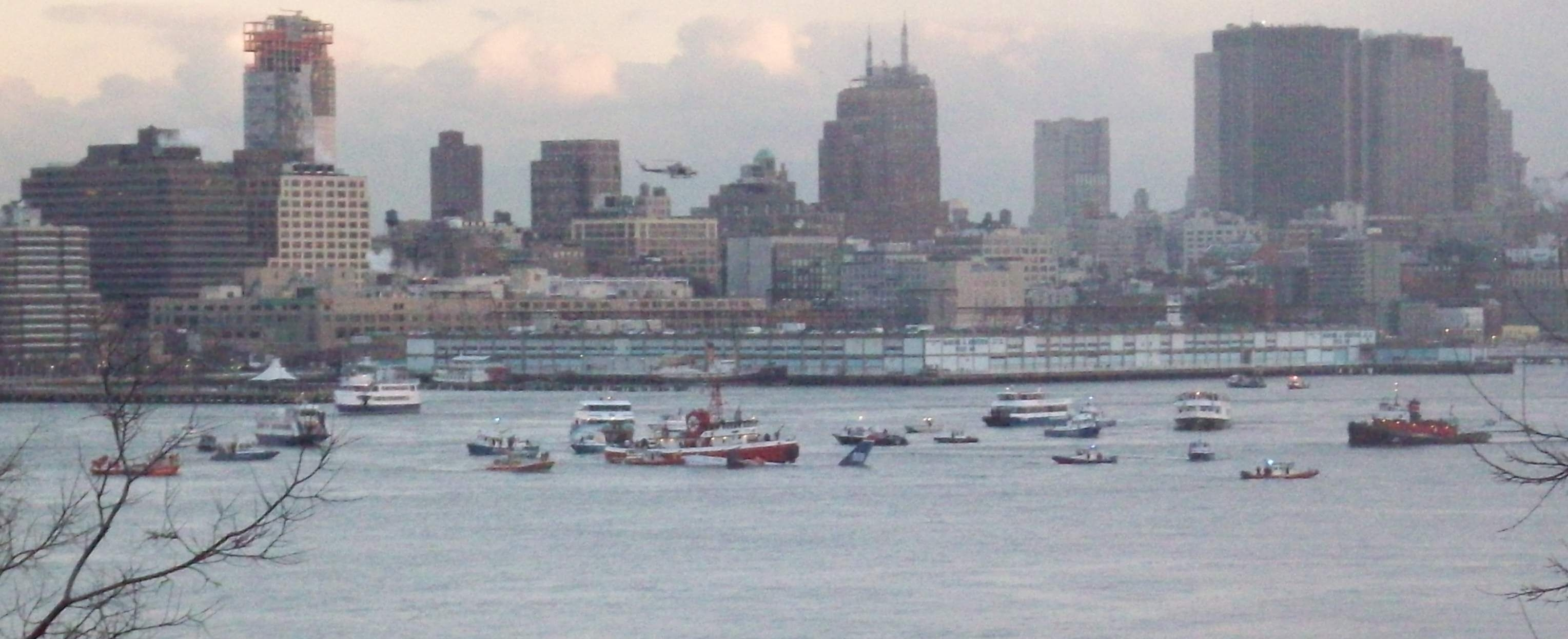
The plane in the Hudson River surrounded by Coast Guard, FDNY, NYPD, and ferryboats

In 2001, Circle Line vessels helped transport victims of the September 11 attacks in the maritime evacuation following them. Many were brought to what has since become the site of Hudson Riverfront 9/11 Memorial in Weehawken, New Jersey.

After US Airways Flight 1549 was forced to land in the Hudson River in 2009, Circle Line Sightseeing vessels were among the first to respond.

== Fleet ==
Currently, Circle Line Sightseeing operates 8 vessels with an additional two under construction, including:

- Sightseer XII - commissioned in 1933 as the United States Coast Guard patrol boat Argo, sold in 1955 and later acquired by Circle Line.
- Circle Line XVI - commissioned in 1934 as the USCG patrol boat Nike, decommissioned in 1964 and sold to Circle Line in 1966.
- Circle Line XVII - commissioned in 1934 as the USCG patrol boat Triton, decommissioned in 1967 and sold to Circle Line in 1973.
- Circle Line Manhattan - purpose-built in 2008 to replace Circle Line XI.
- Circle Line Brooklyn - purpose-built in 2009.
- Circle Line Queens - purpose-built in 2009.
- The Beast - speedboat that entered service with Circle Line in 2011.
- Circle Line Bronx - built by Gladding-Hearn Shipbuilding and delivered in January 2017.
- Circle Line Staten Island - built by Gladding-Hearn Shipbuilding and delivered in May 2017.
- Circle Line Liberty - built by Gladding-Hearn Shipbuilding and delivered in March 2018.

The Bronx, Staten Island, and Liberty constitute Circle Line's new Empire-class boats, which claim to be state-of-the-art, and include modern amenities like digital screens and improved sound systems.

Additionally, while she has been retired from service, the Circle Line X is retained by Circle Line. Circle Line X was originally built for the US Navy in 1944 as a Landing Craft Infantry (Large), designated USS LCI(L)-758. 758 participated in several landings during the Pacific Theater of World War II, including those during the battles of Leyte, Ormoc Bay, Mindoro, and Lingayen Gulf. 758 was decommissioned in 1946 and sold to Circle Line, who converted her into a tourist vessel and renamed her Circle Line X. She served in this role until her retirement in 2007, and as of 2015 Circle Line plans to turn her into a floating museum and terminal alongside Pier 83.
