= Polar Beverages =

Soft drink company

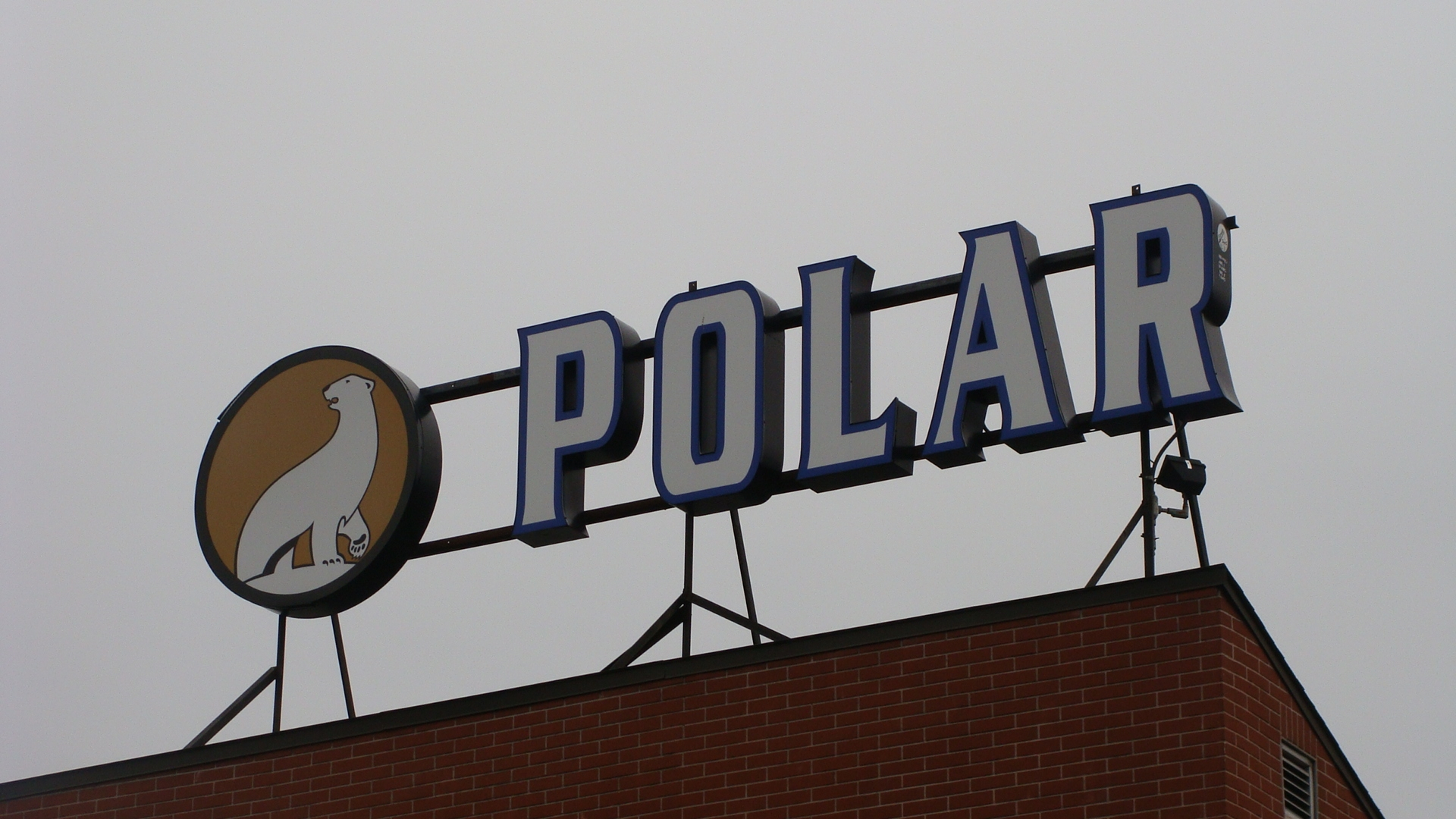
- Type: Privately held company
- Industry: Beverages
- Founded: 1882
- Headquarters: Worcester, Massachusetts, U.S.
- Key people: Ralph Crowley Jr. Christopher Crowley; James (Jeff) Crowley; David Crowley
- Products: Polar Seltzers, Sodas and Mixers
- Brands: Adirondack Beverages; Polar Seltzer; Cape Cod Dry
- Website: polarbeverages.com

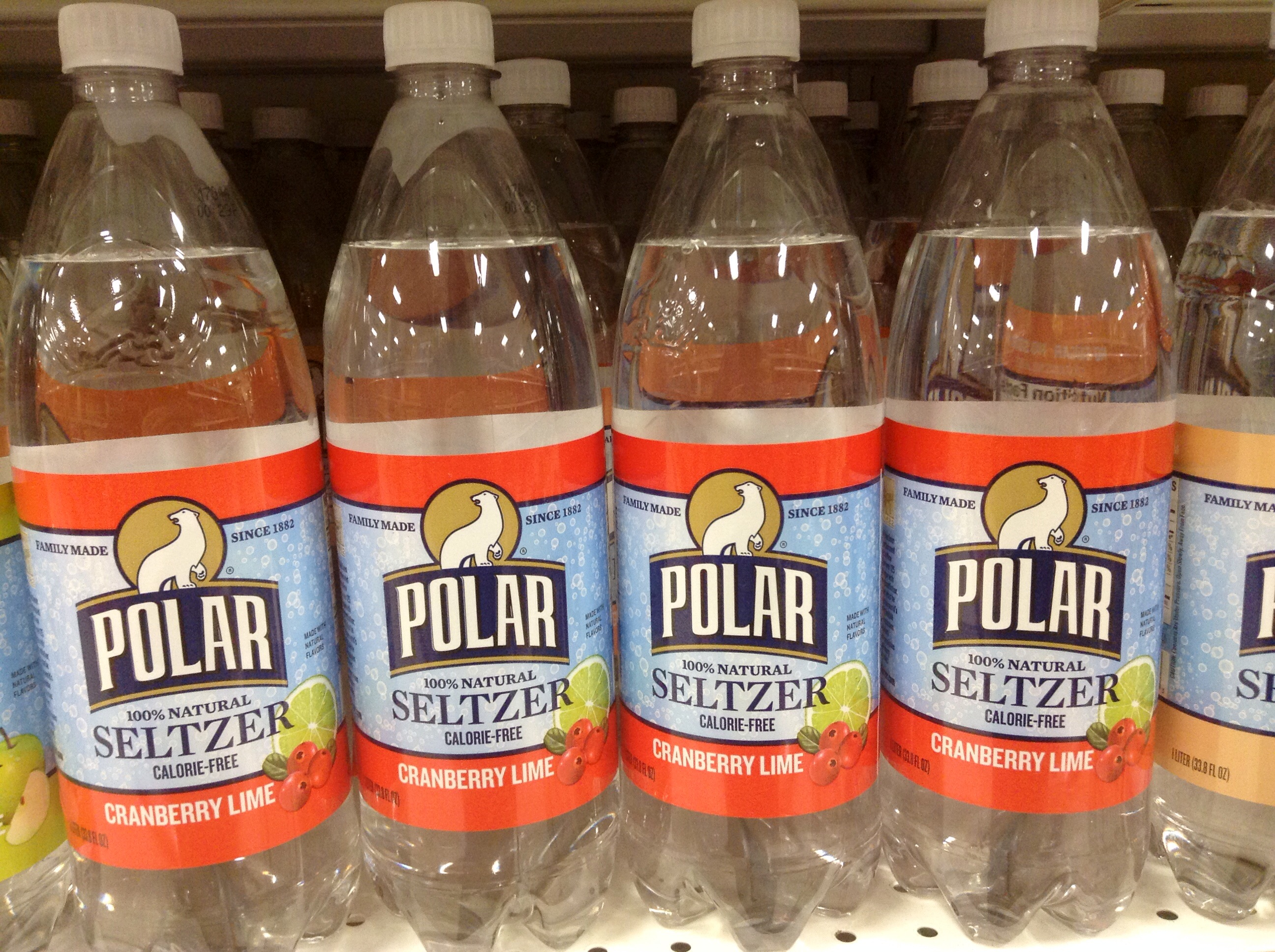
Cranberry Lime flavor.

Polar Beverages is an American soft drink company based in Worcester, Massachusetts. It is a manufacturer and distributor of still spring water, and sparkling fruit beverages, seltzer, ginger ale, drink mixers, and spring water to customers in the United States. It is the largest independent soft-drink bottler in the United States.

It markets beverages under its flagship brand, Polar Beverages, and under the brands Adirondack Beverages, Polar Seltzer, and Cape Cod Dry. In addition to its own drinks, Polar bottles and distributes national brands for companies such as Keurig Dr Pepper. The company has two bottling plants and six distribution facilities; it also offers corporate water services and beverage vending equipment.

It is a fourth-generation, family-owned business that traces its roots to 1882, and is run by Ralph Crowley Jr., the great-grandson of founder Dennis M. Crowley.

== History ==
Polar was founded by Ralph’s great-grandfather, Dennis Mark "Boss" Crowley. The business began in the 1880s as the J. G. Bieberbach Company, a liquor company. In 1916, the company took on the Polar name. The company stopped selling whiskey during Prohibition and began selling carbonated beverages like waters, ginger ales and drys. The company is a member of the Worcester Regional Chamber of Commerce.

In the 1990s, Adirondack Beverages was acquired by Polar Beverages.

In October 2021, Polar Beverages acquired a bottling facility in Temple, Texas, expanding its production capacity and presence in the southern and western United States. The facility was renamed to Polar Texas Bottling.

=== Partnership with Keurig ===
In July 2020, Polar partnered with Keurig Dr Pepper to expand their market nationwide. Under the partnership, the Crowley family retains company ownership with direct access to Keurig's delivery and marketing network.

== Mascot ==
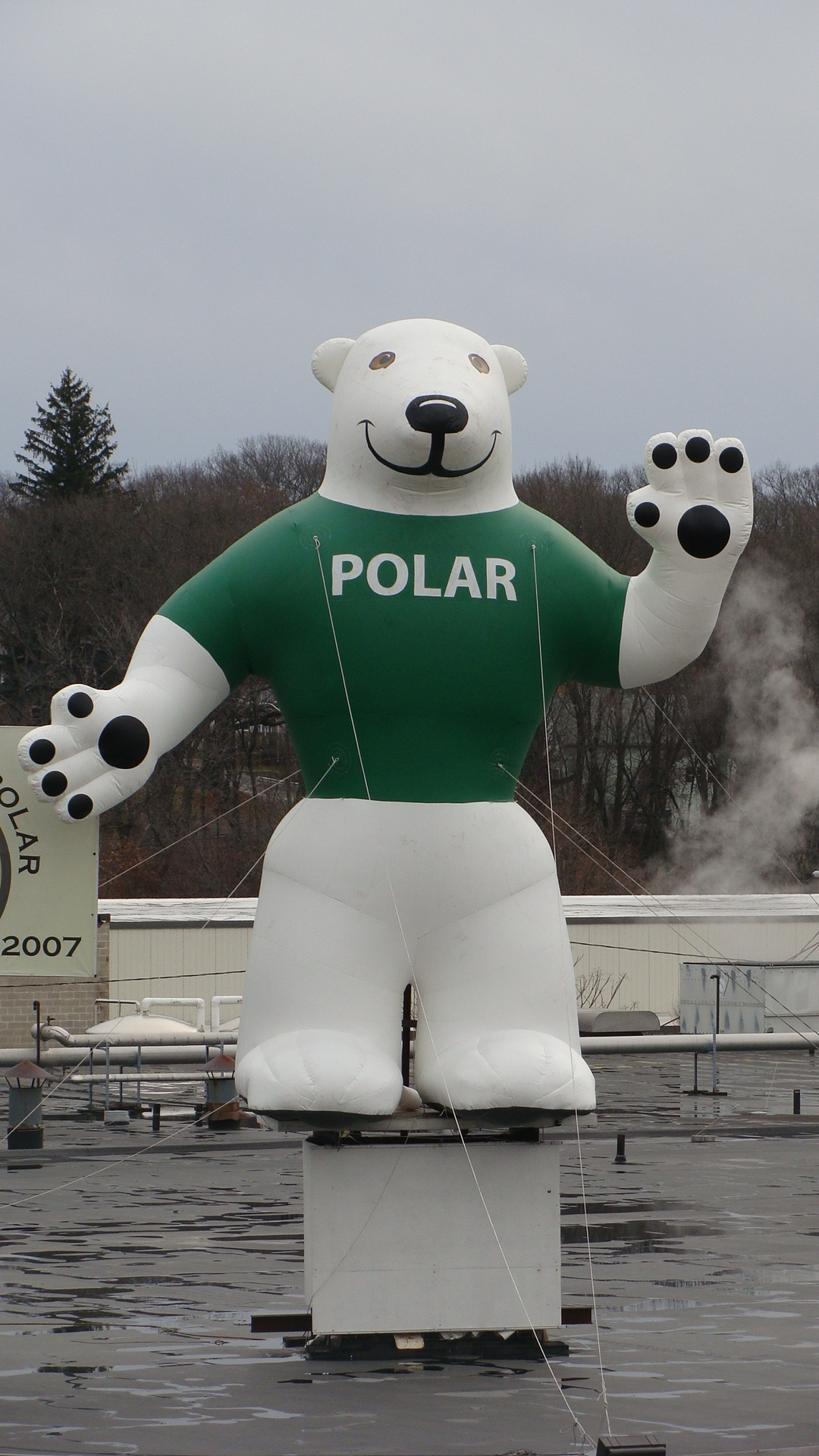
Orson the Bear

A polar bear named Orson has been the company's mascot since 1902. Next to the company's billboard near I-290 in Worcester, a large inflatable version of Orson can be seen smiling and "waving" to passersby. The oversized bear is tied down by wire, to keep the bear in place during rough weather, and to prevent theft. Orson has sometimes been stolen by local fraternities as a prank.

== Sponsorships ==
Polar Beverage's Seltzer line is an official drink of US Sailing under a 3 year marketing partnership signed in 2024.

Polar is the naming rights sponsor for Polar Park in Worcester, home of the Worcester Red Sox baseball team, Triple-A affiliates of the Boston Red Sox.

== Controversy ==
=== Conflict with Coca-Cola ===
In 1994, Polar made a TV commercial where a polar bear considers drinking a Coca-Cola, but throws it into a recycling bin marked, "Keep the Arctic pure." The polar bear then reaches down into the freezing Arctic water and pulls out a can of Polar Seltzer and drinks from it contentedly. Coca-Cola filed a motion for an injunction against Polar in United States District Court in Boston, contending that the commercial made Coke's product appear impure.

The court granted Coca-Cola's motion because the commercial "implied that Coke [was] not pure" and misrepresented the nature and quality of Coke, thereby potentially harming the soft drink irreparably. The injunction required Polar to revise the ad. According to Polar, the judge's ruling affirmed the right of Polar to use a polar bear in its ads, but limited them from discarding the Coke can.

=== "100% Natural" labeling lawsuit ===
In 2025, Polar Beverages was named in a class action lawsuit alleging that its "100% Natural" seltzers contained synthetic ingredients and were falsely advertised. The lawsuit, filed in federal court, claimed that testing had identified synthetic compounds in some products. In July 2025, a federal judge dismissed the case, finding that the plaintiffs’ allegations lacked sufficient specificity, but allowed them to file an amended complaint. The court found that the plaintiffs had not sufficiently identified which product flavours were tested or demonstrated that the tested samples were representative.

== See also ==
- Polar Park (baseball park)
