= Circle Line X =

Ferryboat, former landing craft

- Name: USS LCI(L)-758
- Completed: 10 April 1944
- Commissioned: 20 May 1944
- Decommissioned: May 1946
- Reinstated: 1951–2007 (passenger service)
- Fate: Repowered and converted to passenger vessel in New York City (1951)

United States
- Name: Circle Line X
- Owner: Circle Line Sightseeing Cruises
- Identification: MMSI number: 367032240; Callsign: WL2002
- Status: Out of service

General characteristics
- Class & type: LCI(L)-351-class large landing craft
- Displacement: 246 t (242 long tons)
- Length: 158 ft 5 1/2 in (48.298 m)
- Beam: 23 ft 3 in (7.09 m)
- Draft: 3 ft 1 1/2 in (0.953 m)
- Speed: 16 kn (30 km/h; 18 mph)
- Complement: 4 Officers, 24 Enlisted
- Armament: 5 × 22mm gun

U.S. National Register of Historic Places
- Designated: 22 September 2014
- Reference no.: 14000702

New York State Register of Historic Places
- Designated: 21 July 2014
- Reference no.: 06101.018791

Circle Line X (formerly USS LCI(L)-758, Normandy Two, and Normandy) is a retired ferryboat that typically operated in New York City. Built in 1944 as a Landing Craft Infantry (Large) for the United States Navy, she was decommissioned in 1946 and sold in the 1950s. After briefly being owned by two other companies, she was sold in 1955 to Circle Line Sightseeing Cruises, which converted her into a tourist vessel. Circle Line X operated in this capacity until 2007 when she was retired. In 2014, Circle Line announced plans to convert Circle Line X into a museum; the vessel was added to the National Register of Historic Places the same year. Circle Line X's hull is made of welded steel, with an angle iron frame; she has three decks.

== History ==
Circle Line X was originally built for the United States Navy in 1944 as a Landing Craft Infantry (Large), designated USS LCI(L)-758. She was manufactured at the Commercial Iron shipyard in Portland, Oregon, which produced more than 200 ships for World War II. During the Pacific Theater of World War II, the 758 participated in several landings including those during the battles of Leyte, Ormoc Bay, Mindoro, and Lingayen Gulf. During the war, she traveled an estimated 250,000 miles (400,000 km), and none of her crew died during battle. The 758 is cited as having shot down two enemy aircraft and participated in five battles. These military engagements earned 758 and her crew numerous awards, specifically the China Service Medal, American Campaign Medal, Asiatic–Pacific Campaign Medal, World War II Victory Medal, Navy Occupation Service Medal, Philippine Republic Presidential Unit Citation, and Philippine Liberation Medal. The 758 also participated in the 1945 liberation of Shanghai after being caught in a large typhoon that September.

The 758 was decommissioned in 1946 and sold in the 1950s, when the United States Navy sold off numerous World War II vessels as surplus. The 758 was first sold in 1951 to Normandy Sightseeing, which renamed her the Normandy Two; her name was shortened to Normandy in 1953 when she was resold to Day Line Sightseeing. She was sold yet again in 1955 to Circle Line Sightseeing Cruises, which rebuilt her in Mill Basin, Brooklyn; she was originally known as Circle Line Sightseer X and later just as Circle Line X. Circle Line outfitted Circle Line X with a variable-pitch propeller and a radar system. She was one of several ex-LCI vessels acquired by Circle Line, along with others including Circle Line VII (adapted from USS LCI(L)-191) and VIII (adapted from USS LCI(L)-179). Although Circle Line X was slower and harder to maneuver than Circle Line's other fleet, two of the ship's captains said that she "became one of our favorites".

Like the other Circle Line fleet, Circle Line X was used on the company's cruises that circumnavigated Manhattan, except during the winter, when she was stored in Mill Basin. In addition, Circle Line X could be chartered for cruises in the New York–New Jersey Harbor Estuary; to accommodate this use, Circle Line added a bar and conducted other renovations. Circle Line X was also used for other events, such as mystery-themed cruises and the filming of an episode of the TV series Zero Hour, where the wheelhouse stood in for a submarine's interior. Circle Line X was used exclusively for sightseeing after 1988, when Circle Line merged with another yacht company. In 1994, Circle Line hosted a reunion cruise with surviving crew members who had worked on 758 during World War II, organized by the vessel's former captain. The New York Times wrote that many of the crew members were unaware that she still existed and that, at the time, the vessel had various printouts describing her naval history.

Circle Line X continued to operate until her retirement in 2007. In 2014, Circle Line announced plans to convert Circle Line X into a museum; at the time, the vessel had been towed to between piers 41 and 43 of Hudson River Park. Circle Line X was nominated for inclusion on the National Register of Historic Places and the New York State Register of Historic Places that year. She was added to the NRHP on 22 September 2014, with reference number #14000702. According to the NRHP nomination report, the vessel retained almost all of her sightseeing-era features, but few remnants of her military use were intact.

== Description ==
Circle Line X's hull is made of welded steel, with an angle iron frame and nine bulkheads that are welded to the deck and hull. She measures 158 feet 5 1/2 inches (48 m) long, while her beam, or maximum width, is 23 feet 3 inches (7.09 m). (Note: Brian Cudahy cites a different a width of 153 by 23 by 11 feet (46.6 m × 7.0 m × 3.4 m).) The vessel has a mean draft, or depth below waterline, of 3 feet 1 1/2 inches (0.953 m) when she is running light; her total depth, from the main deck to the lowest point of the hull, is 11.3 feet (3.4 m). Originally, 758 could travel at a top speed of 16 knots (30 km/h; 18 mph) and had a crew of 4 officers and 24 enlisted sailors, as well as a capacity of 188 soldiers and 75 short tons (68 t; 67 long tons) of cargo. She had five gun turrets—one on the bow and two each on port and starboard—with 2 inches (51 mm) of plastic armor shielding the turrets.

Circle Line X has three decks. The upper deck has a round, recessed wheelhouse surrounded by a bridge; this wheelhouse replaced an earlier pilot house that was too tall to fit under the Harlem River's bridges. The central section of the upper deck has windows on its port and starboard sides, while a companionway descends to the main deck. The stern, accessed by doorways, has a canopy and is open to the elements. On the main deck, the section under the wheelhouse is open to the elements as well. The afterpeak of the main deck, near the stern, is accessed by a hatch from the main deck's bow; the stern itself has a secondary wheelhouse that can be used for steering in emergencies. The below deck contains the engines, generators, and other mechanical equipment. The crew compartment and steering compartment are also in the below deck.

== See also ==
- National Register of Historic Places listings in Manhattan from 14th to 59th Streets

== Sources ==
- Cudahy, Brian J. (1997). Around Manhattan Island and Other Maritime Tales of New York. Fordham Univ Press. ISBN 978-0-8232-1761-8.
- Historic Structures Report: Circle Line X (sightseeing vessel) (Report). National Register of Historic Places, National Park Service. 22 September 2014.
