= Adirondack Beverages =

American beverage company

- Type: Private
- Industry: Beverage
- Founded: Scotia, New York, U.S. 1967
- Headquarters: Scotia, New York, U.S.
- Area served: North East U.S.
- Products: Polar Seltzers, Sodas and Mixers
- Brands: Adirondack Seltzer; Adk Soda; Frannie's Sparkling Love; Clear & Sparkling
- Parent: Polar Beverages
- Website: www.adirondackbeverages.com

Adirondack Beverages is a beverage company in the Mohawk Valley region of New York state.

== History ==
In the 1990s, Adirondack Beverages was acquired by Polar Beverages.

== Products ==
They produce many flavors of carbonated beverages including a cola named Adirondack Cola. The company formerly produced a line of low-calorie drinks under the label Waist Watcher, which was licensed by Weight Watchers International. This line has since been replaced by Frannie's Sparkling Love.

=== Sparkling Water ===
- Simply Citrus
- Wild Berry
- Raspberry Lime
- Lemon Lime
- Mandarin Orange
- Cherry Vanilla
- Original

=== Frannie's Sparkling Love ===
- Black Cherry Noire
- Blood Orange Bliss
- Pink Pomelo Paloma
- Luscious Lemony Lemonade
- Irish Ginger Ale
- Very Vanilla Creme
- Cold Coco Latte

=== Clear & Sparkling ===
- Summer Peach
- Tropical Orange
- Key Lime
- Strawberry Kiwi
- Wild Cherry
- Black Cherry
- Raspberry Duet
- Concord Grape

=== Old-School Soda ===
- Black Cherry
- Grape
- Lemon-Up
- Orange
- Pineapple
- Tropical Punch
- Vanilla Cream
