= PS Washington Irving =

American sidewheel passenger day boat, in service 1913–1926

Coordinates: 40.728778°N 74.030882°W

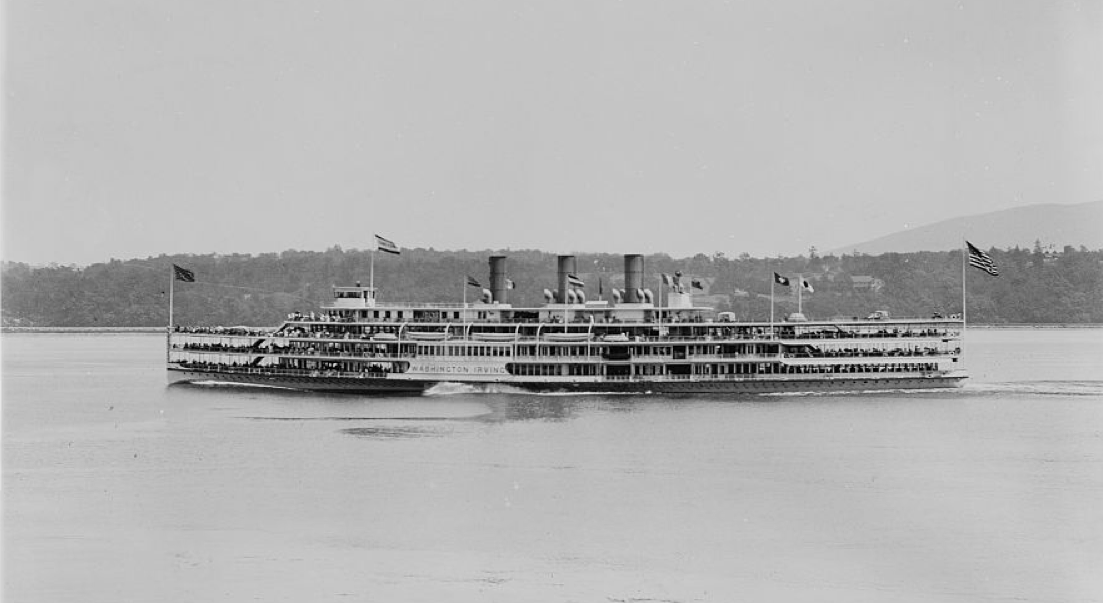
- Steamer Washington Irving ca. 1913.

History
- Namesake: Washington Irving
- Owner: Hudson River Day Line
- Route: Hudson River between New York City and Albany NY
- Builder: New York Shipbuilding Company
- Cost: $1,000,000
- Yard number: 126
- Laid down: 23 May 1912
- Launched: 7 December 1912
- Completed: 1912
- Maiden voyage: 17 May 1913
- Out of service: 1 June 1926
- Stricken: 1 June 1926
- Fate: Collided with oil barge and sunk
- Notes: World record at the time for licensed passenger-carrying capacity. Had adequate deck space for 1,400 more than its 6,000 capacity license.

General characteristics
- Tonnage: 4,000
- Length: 416 feet 6 inches (126.9 m) LOA
- Beam: 86 feet 6 inches (26.4 m) BOA; 44 feet (13.4 m) molded
- Draft: 8 feet 6 inches (2.6 m)
- Depth: 14 feet 2 inches (4.3 m)
- Decks: Four
- Installed power: Steam via oil burners
- Propulsion: River side-wheel steamer
- Speed: 23.5 miles per hour (37.8 km/h)
- Capacity: 6,000 passengers

PS Washington Irving was a 4,000-short-ton (3,600 t) sidewheel day boat and the flagship of the Hudson River Day Line that operated on the Hudson River from 1913 to 1926.

The Washington Irving collided with an oil barge in the fog on 1 June 1926 on the North River. With the aid of tugboats, it reached shore at Pier 12, Jersey City, where it sank soon thereafter. Out of 200 passengers and 105 crew, three died as a result of the accident.

Its removal was complicated due to its sinking upon the site of the Holland Tunnel, which was under construction. It remained submerged there until 13 February 1927, when it was raised and determined to be a total loss. A bond was issued for its replacement.

== Characteristics ==
The quadruple-decker Washington Irving, named after the author Washington Irving, was built in 1912 by the New York Shipbuilding Company for contract number 126 with machinery built by W. & A. Fletcher Company of Hoboken, New Jersey. The ship was launched 7 December 1912 and delivered 3 May 1913 for use in the New York City-Albany service.

Naval architect Frank E. Kirby, designer of large Great Lakes passenger steamers, collaborated with the New York City firm J. W. Millard & Brothers, designers of ferry boats, to design the ship. Kirby's Seeandbee, launched 9 November 1912 at the Detroit Shipbuilding Company, was the largest side wheel ship in the world at the time. Preliminary design tests on hull form were conducted by at the University of Michigan determining the best form for minimum wave making resistance in shallow water at high speeds. With a carrying capacity of 6,000 passengers, it had the largest passenger-carrying capacity of any riverboat built at the time of its construction.

The steel-hulled steamer measured 416 feet 6 inches (126.9 m) length overall, 86 feet 6 inches (26.4 m) beam over all, 44 feet (13.4 m) molded beam, 14 feet 2 inches (4.3 m) depth and 8 feet 6 inches (2.6 m) draft. The ship's tonnage was 4,000-short-ton (3,600 t). Seven transverse bulkheads divided the hull with extensive strengthening for rigidity of the five decks to prevent hogging and sagging without use of visible hogging girders prevalent on older vessels of the type. Steel and asbestos were used in hull and superstructure, particularly in high exposure areas such as fire room and galley, whenever practical for fire protection.

Propulsion was by steel, feathering paddles 24 feet 6 inches (7.5 m) in diameter 6,000 horsepower (4,500 kW) driven by a three-cylinder compound inclined engine with cylinders measuring 45 inches (110 cm), 70 inches (180 cm) and 70 inches (180 cm) with an 84 inches (210 cm) stroke. Four single-ended and two double-ended Scotch boilers provided steam. The single-ended boilers measured 12 feet 4 inches (3.8 m) diameter by 11 feet 11 inches (3.6 m) length, and the double-ended boilers were 12 feet 4 inches (3.8 m) diameter by 22 feet (6.7 m) in length with coal consumption of five tons per hour. operating speed was 23.5 miles per hour (37.8 km/h) or, in marine terms, 20.4 knots. Two 35 kilowatt Kerr turbo generators provided electrical power.

The ship had three smoke stacks amidships for its boilers, but the forward stack was non-functioning; only added for aesthetic purposes. The ship began service with the Hudson River Day Line as their flagship steamer from 1913 to 1926.

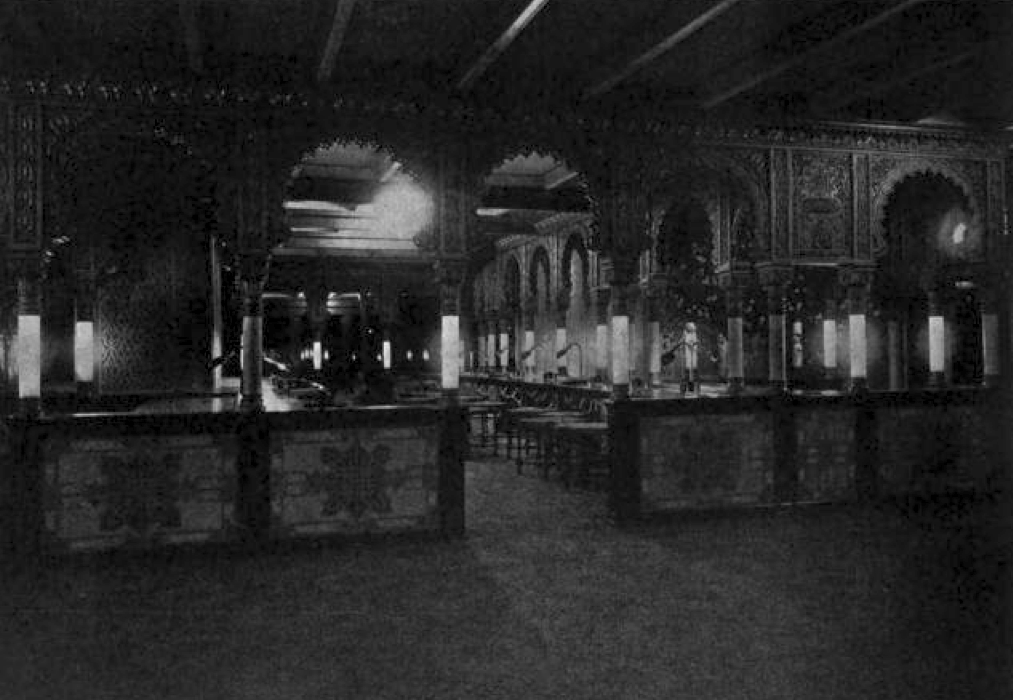
Writing room patterned on Alhambra designs.

Washington Irving was intended solely for passenger day service and neither sleeping nor cargo spaces were incorporated in design. Nineteen private "balcony parlors" were available with the rest of the spaces being large public spaces with decor based on the Irving period. A large writing room's design was based on the Alhambra. Forward, below the main deck, was a large lunch room patterned on the Old Cock Tavern of London and a ladies lounge was patterned on Irving's study at "Sunnyside". The main dining room, on the after main deck, was purely in Colonial style. The main saloon on the main deck blended Moorish and Knickerbocker designs and was among the largest rooms afloat. The vessel had about 2 acres (0.8 ha) of outside deck space and rooms were fitted with large plate glass for views of the river. Though licensed for 6,000 passengers, breaking a record for such ships previously held by consort Hendrik Hudson, the deck space would have made it possible to carry 1,400 more than its 6,000 capacity license allowed.

== Service life ==
The Washington Irving operated daily leisure passenger service up and down the Hudson River. Its maiden voyage was on Saturday, 17 May 1913 from the Desbrosses Street Pier in New York City with a destination of Albany. On that voyage, fifty oil paintings by artists illustrating the Irving period were on view. Tickets for the maiden voyage sold for $1.00.

Washington Irving replaced the Robert Fulton on the New York to Albany run. The ship remained in service up until its sinking in 1926 and was the only ship in service ever to be lost by the Day Line. The first pilot of the Washington Irving from 1913 through 1923 was Captain Van Woert.

== Sinking ==
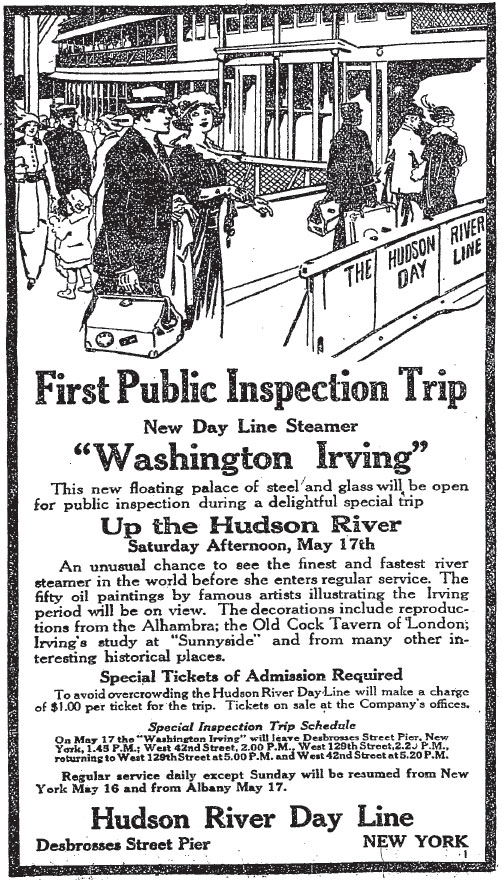
The New York Times display advertisement for the inaugural cruise of the Washington Irving.

Soon after departing the Desbrosses Street Pier on its way to Albany in the morning fog of 1 June 1926, Washington Irving was struck, a little after 9:00am, by one of two oil barges being pushed by the tug boat Thomas E. Moran. The collision damaged Washington Irving's starboard side below the water line just aft of amidships, allowing water to rush into the engine rooms. The collision resulted in a hole measuring 21 feet (6.4 m) long and 3 feet (0.91 m) wide. The Captain, David H. Deming, ordered all passengers to put on life preservers and whistled the "Ship's afire" signal of two long and three short blasts repeatedly. A chaos of shouts prevailed as the passengers tried to don life vests and locate their children in the fog. An inability to see any land increased the alarm of the passengers despite the Captain's shouts that all would be safe and he ordered the jazz band to resume playing their music and maintain their post until rescue.

Assisted by tug boats, Washington Irving reached shore at the then under construction Pier 12, Jersey City and sank five minutes later. Three passengers died as a result of the accident. Wylma Wood Hoag, (wife of Lynne Arthur Hoag and mother to Arthur Allen Hoag), their three-year-old daughter Mary, and B. Woods, a steward, who was trapped in a cabin far below deck. The accident was determined to be unavoidable due to "the unusual and unexpected strength of the tidal current, possibly below the surface" after an inquiry by the United States Steamship Inspection Board closed on 9 June 1926.

Washington Irving was valued at $1,000,000 but insured for much less. The barge suffered only $8,000 of damages. At the time of the sinking, Alexander McKinney was the head porter. He had joined the Day Line in 1905 and continued in their service till at least 1964.

== Aftermath ==
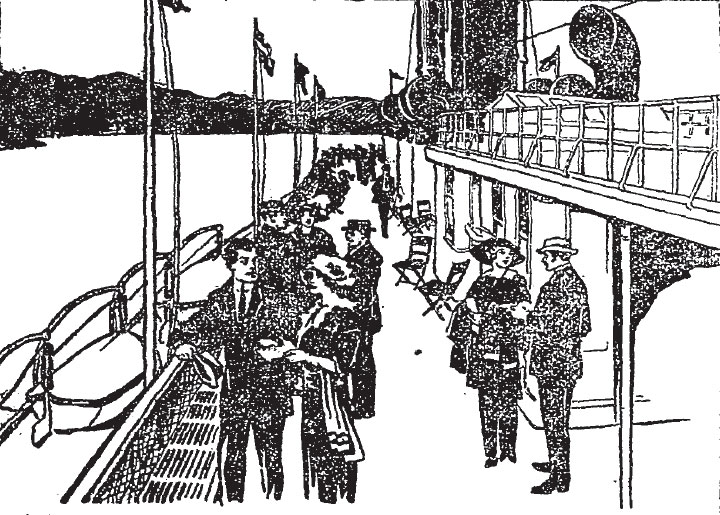
Drawing of the upper deck.

Washington Irving had sunk on top of the New York-New Jersey vehicular tube complicating its removal. The wreck became a menace to navigation and was struck at 3am on 16 June by a railroad car float. Washington Irving was raised on 13 February 1927 and towed to a dry dock to determine whether its condition warranted repair. In March, Washington Irving was determined to be a total loss and a bond was issued to refinance the company's debt and to provide financing for its replacement, the Peter Stuyvesant. The Peter Stuyvesant was originally estimated to cost $700,000, but when the boat was completed in June, the final cost was closer to $1,000,000.

== See also ==
- Shipwreck
