= Hudson River Day Line =

Commercial steamboat line on the Hudson River (1863-1962)

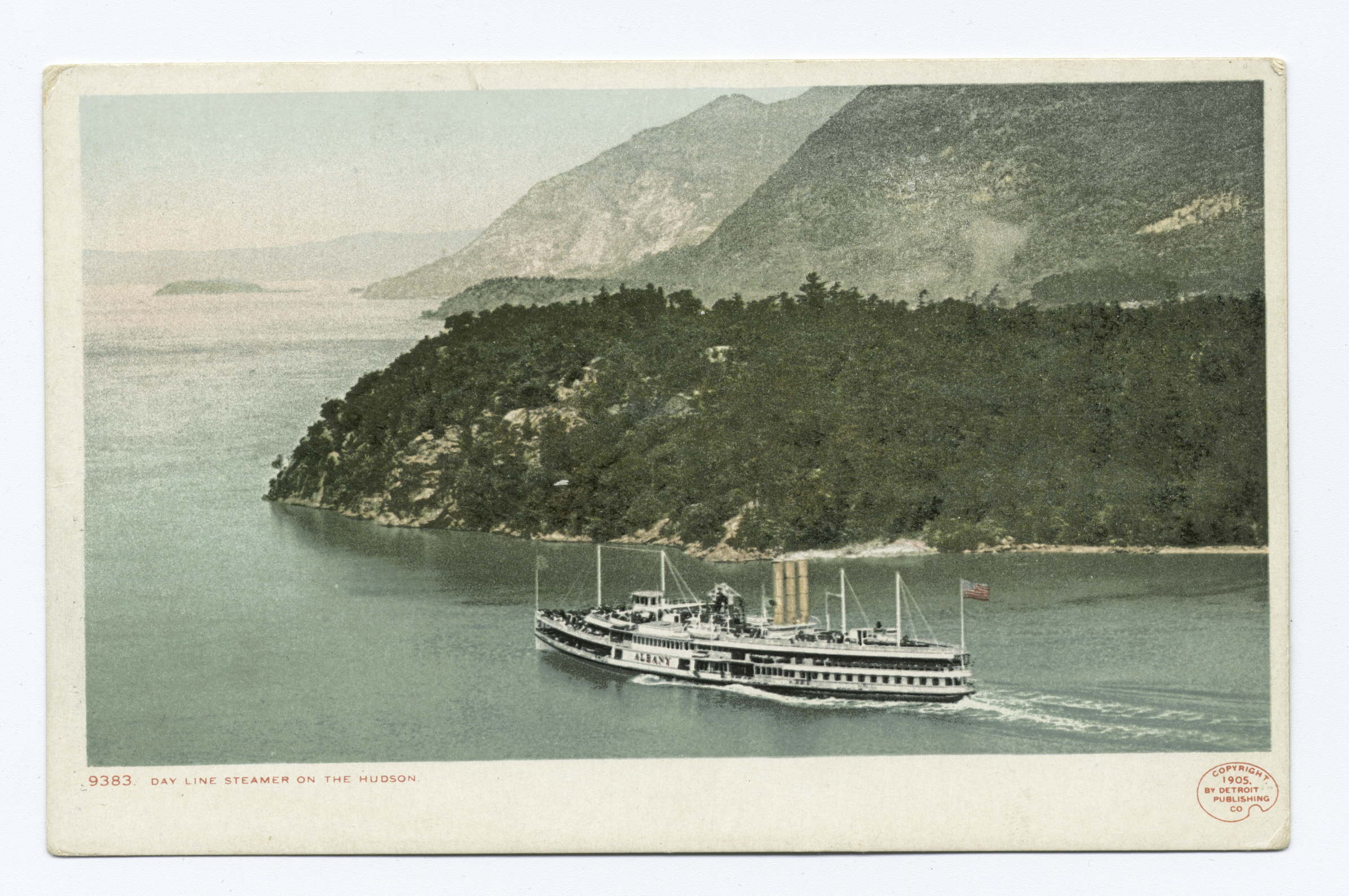
Postcard of Day Line steamer on the Hudson River at West Point

The Hudson River Day Line was a commercial steamboat line on the Hudson River active from 1863 through 1962; with a brief period of inactivity in the late 1940s. While the company was not officially incorporated until 1879, the company had already been in operation since 1863 when it was founded by Alfred Van Santvoord and John McB. Davidson. The company operated continuously until 1948 when it went out of business. The company was then sold to a group led by businessman George Sanders, and passenger service resumed but with Albany service eliminated and the northernmost stop being Poughkeepsie, New York. In 1962 the company was sold again but this time absorbed into Circle Line Sightseeing Cruises, and under that organization the final travels of the Hudson River Day Line's steam boats occurred in 1971.

During its history, the Hudson River Day Line transported millions of passengers between the cities of Albany, New York and New York City. In its peak year of operation in 1925 the line had seven active steam boats and transported more than two million passengers. The line also made stops at tourist destinations in the Catskill Mountains, and at parks like Bear Mountain State Park and Kingston Point Park; making the line a popular travel tool for vacationers and day picnickers from New York City. The line was known for its reasonable prices and its comfortable and elegant environment on board gained the ships of the line the monicker "floating palaces". The ships were equipped with live orchestras and bands to entertain passengers, and had both a high end restaurant and a more affordable cafeteria on board for meals.

== List of steamboats with years in service with Hudson River Day Line ==
Note:

- PS Daniel Drew purchased 1863 - burned 1886
- PS Armenia purchased 1863 - operated 1863 season - sold 1883
- PS Chauncey Vibbard built 1864 - ceased regular operation for Hudson River Day Line 1887
- PS Albany built 1880 - last season of service for Hudson River Day Line 1930
- PS New York built 1887 - burned 1908
- PS Mary Powell acquired 1903 - last season of service 1917
- PS Hendrick Hudson built 1906 - last season of service for Hudson River Day Line 1948
- PS Robert Fulton built 1909 - sold 1956
- PS Washington Irving built 1913 - sank 1926
- PS DeWitt Clinton purchased 1920 - last season of service for Hudson River Day Line 1939
- PS Alexander Hamilton built 1924 - last season of service for Hudson River Day Line 1971
- PS Chauncey M. Depew purchased 1925 - last season of service for Hudson River Day Line 1940
- PS Peter Stuyvesant built 1927 - last season of service for Hudson River Day Line 1962

== In popular culture ==
The PS Hendrick Hudson was the setting for Philip Bartholomae's 1911 Broadway play Over Night. The Broadway musical Very Good Eddie (1915) takes place aboard the Hudson River Day Line boat "The Catskill".

== Bibliography ==
- Blume, Kenneth J. (2012). "Hudson River Day Line". Historical dictionary of the U.S. maritime industry. Historical dictionaries of professions and industries. Lanham, Md: Scarecrow Press. ISBN 978-0-8108-5634-9.
- Elliott, Richard V.; Elliott, Linda (2024). The boats of summer. Vol. 1. Atglen: Schiffer Publishing. ISBN 9780764367410.
- Elliott, Richard V.; Elliott, Linda (2024). The boats of summer. Vol. 2. Atglen: Schiffer Publishing. ISBN 978-0-7643-6740-3.
- Ewen, William H. (1967). Days of the Steamboats. Parents' Magazine Press.
- Ewen, William H. (2011). Steamboats on the Hudson River. Images of America. Charleston, SC: Arcadia Pub. ISBN 978-0-7385-7415-8.
- Ringwald, Donald C. (1965). Hudson River Day Line. Howell-North Books.
- Roberts, Franklin B.; Gillespie, John (1974). The Boats We Rode. Quadrant Press Inc.
