= USS Adirondack (ID-1270) =

Steamship

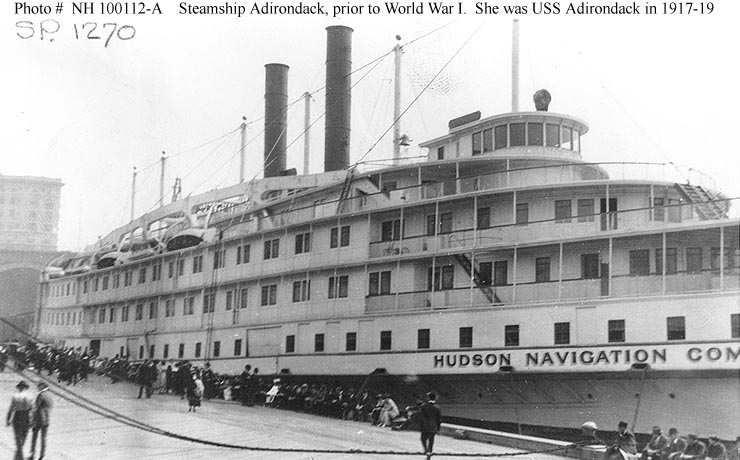
- Adirondack photographed prior to World War I. Note her extensive hogging brace.

History

United States
- Name: Adirondack
- Namesake: Adirondack Mountains
- Owner: Hudson Navigation Company, Pier 32, North River, New York City
- Builder: J Eaglis and Sons, Greenpoint, Brooklyn, New York
- Laid down: 8 June 1895
- Launched: October 1895
- In service: 1896
- Homeport: New York City
- Fate: Chartered by the USN September 1917

History

United States
- Name: Adirondack
- Acquired: 25 September 1917
- In service: 16 October 1917
- Stricken: 24 January 1919
- Identification: Hull symbol: ID-1270
- Fate: Returned to owner 24 January 1919; Abandoned in 1924

General characteristics
- Displacement: 3,882 long tons (3,944 t)
- Length: 388 ft 2 in (118.31 m)
- Beam: 50 ft (15 m)
- Draft: 10 ft (3.0 m) (mean)
- Installed power: 4 × 55 psi (380 kPa) W. & A. Fletcher Company steam boilers; 4,000 hp (3,000 kW)
- Propulsion: 1 × W. & A. Fletcher Company Vertical single expansion low pressure beam steam engine; 2 × side Paddle wheels
- Speed: 11.3 kn (20.9 km/h; 13.0 mph)
- Capacity: 350 staterooms; 1,000 short tons (910 t) cargo space
- Complement: 135

Adirondack, a steel-hulled side-wheel river passenger steamship displacing 3,882 long tons (3,944 t), was built by J. Eaglis and Sons, at Greenpoint, Brooklyn, New York, in 1896, for the Hudson Navigation Company, the "People's Line". Her keel was laid 8 June 1895, and she was launched within five months, probably October 1895, with her fitting out completed in time for the summer 1896 season.

== Design ==
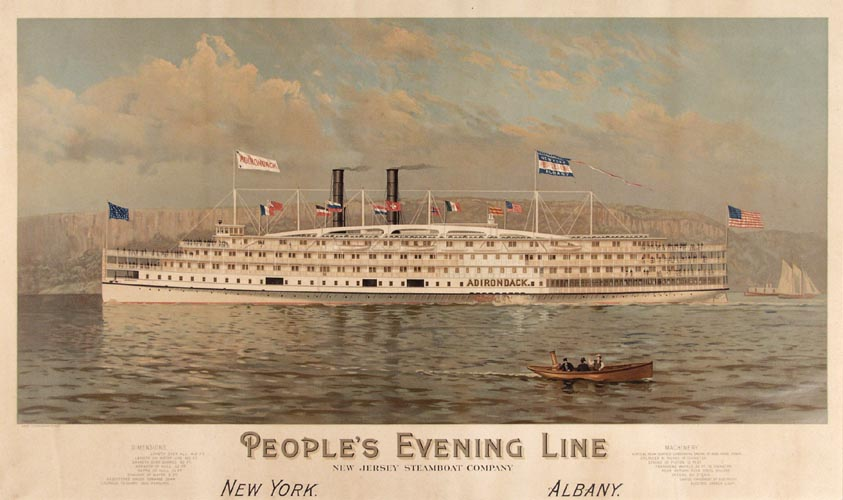
Adirondack advertisement

Adirondack had a hull constructed almost entirely out of wood with a single expansion low pressure beam engine. She was built out of wood to give her more flexibility in pushing over the shoals of the upper Hudson River that she would spend her life traversing between New York and Albany. In a day when most ships were using multi-expansion engines the owners went with the cheaper, and simpler, single expansion engine because she would only be used for part of the year making a one-way, ten hour trip, between New York-to-Albany/Albany-to-New York a day, they felt the fuel efficiency and cost of the more complicated engines would not pay for themselves in the long run.

Adirondack was 412 ft (126 m) long overall with a 50 ft (15 m) beam and a width at the paddle wheel guards of 90 ft (27 m). The depth of hull was 13 ft (4.0 m) and a draft of 8 ft (2.4 m). She was 4,500 short tons (4,100 t) gross measurement and had a freight capacity of 1,000 short tons (910 t). The oak keel was 12 in (300 mm) wide by 16 in (410 mm) deep. The frames, which were of oak, chestnut and red cedar, were 12 inches thick and are spaced 24 in (610 mm) center to center. They varied in depth from 20 in (510 mm) on the floor to 10 in (250 mm) at the sides. There are 11 keelsons of yellow pine, measuring 12 inches by 20 inches, and they were bolted to the frames at each intersection by four bolts. The entire hull was strengthened by diagonal straps of 1/2 in (13 mm) by 4 in (100 mm) iron, which was riveted to the frames at each intersection. The hull was also stiffened by two deep suspension trusses or "hog frames," the top chord of which was 14 in (360 mm) wide by 30 in (760 mm) deep. There were three watertight bulkheads, which reach to the main deck. She had four W. & A. Fletcher Company, steam boilers, of only 55 psi (380 kPa), running a W. & A. Fletcher Company, single expansion engine that produced 4,000 hp (3,000 kW). The engine turned two 30 ft (9.1 m) side wheels at an average of 26 revolutions per minute. Each wheel had 12 curved steel buckets that were 45 in (1,100 mm) wide by 12 ft 8 in (3.86 m) long that dipped approximately 5 1/2 ft (1.7 m) into the water.

== Service history ==
She was chartered by the US Navy for World War I service, delivered on 25 September 1917 she became USS Adirondack (ID 1270), and was officially requisitioned on 16 October 1917. For more than two years, she was employed as a floating barracks attached to the Receiving Ship at the New York Navy Yard, in a noncommissioned status. No longer required after the Armistice.

Adirondack resumed her pre-war operations, serving as a passenger steamer with the Hudson Navigation Co. She was finally abandoned due to age and deterioration during the fiscal year which ended on 30 June 1924.

== Notes ==
Citations

== Bibliography ==
Books

- "The Hudson River Steamer Adirondack, of the People's Line". Scientific American. Vol. 75, no. 26. New York. 26 December 1896.

Online resources

- "Adirondack I (Screw Sloop of War)". Dictionary of American Naval Fighting Ships. Naval History and Heritage Command. 11 June 2015. This article incorporates text from this source, which is in the public domain.
