= New York Water Taxi =

Water taxi service in New York City

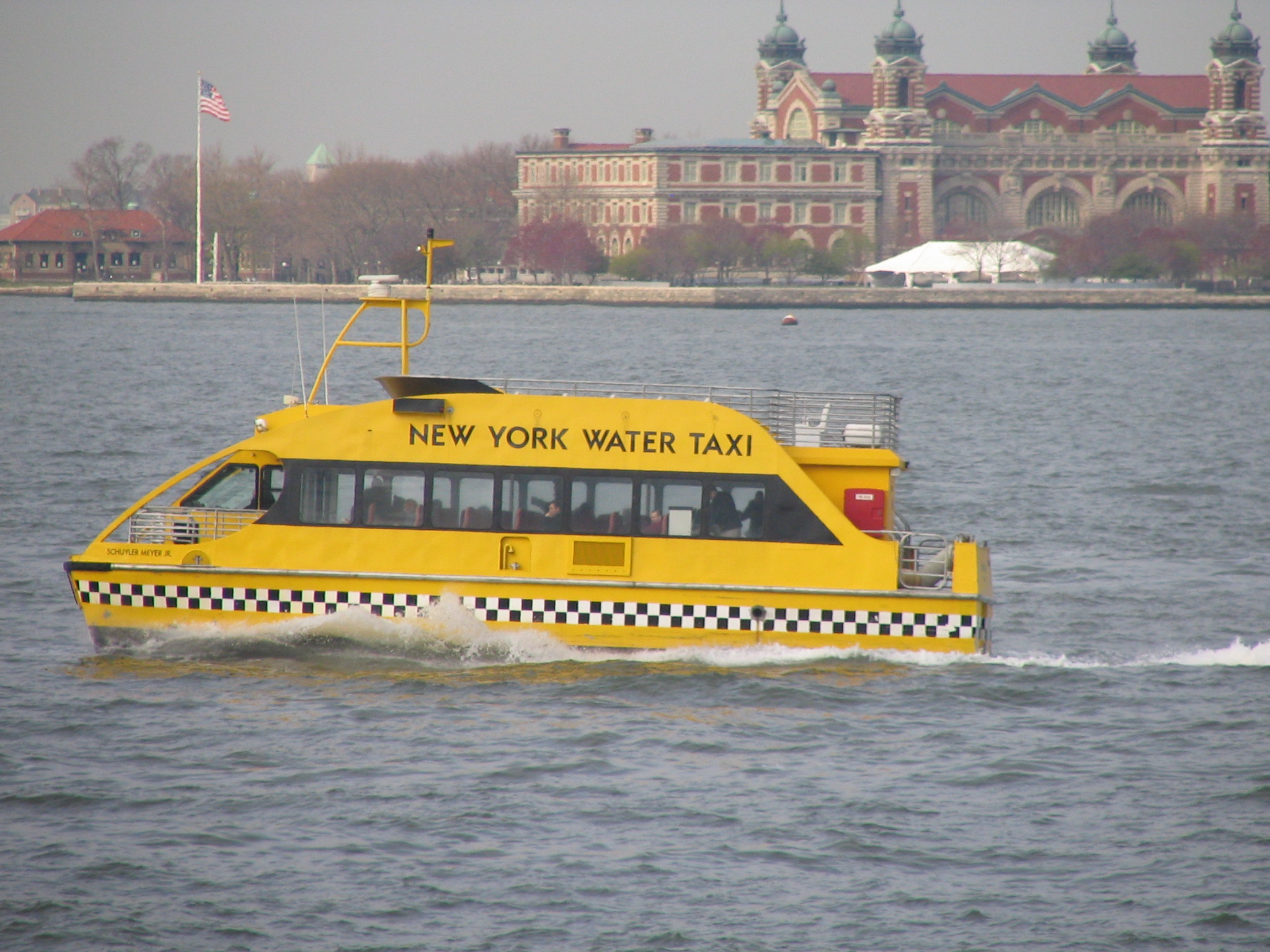
- New York Water Taxi in motion
- Locale: New York City
- Waterway: East River, Hudson River, Upper New York Bay
- Transit type: Private Transportation Water Taxi
- Owner: New York Cruise Lines
- Began operation: September 25, 2002
- Website: nywatertaxi.com

New York Water Taxi (NYWT) is a water taxi service based in New York City. It offers sightseeing, charter, and commuter services mainly to points along the East River and Hudson River. It is one of several private operators of ferries, sightseeing boats, and water taxis in the Port of New York and New Jersey.

NYWT was originally an affiliate company of The Durst Organization Inc., a partnership venture between Douglas Durst and Tom Fox. NYWT has been in existence since September 2002, beginning with a fleet of six yellow vessels with black and white checks. Today, the fleet consists of 10 vessels.

In January 2017, New York Cruise Lines purchased New York Water Taxi.

== History ==
The original New York Water Taxi service debuted in June 1997, five years before the highly successful, permanent version launched in 2002. The initial 1997 venture featured a fledgling fleet of three boxy boats painted bright yellow with black-and-white checkered patterns to mimic classic New York Checker cabs. It was designed to link the Fulton Ferry landing in Brooklyn to the Intrepid Sea-Air-Space Museum, making eight stops along the way. The boats were too small and too slow. They simply could not handle or overcome the strong, unforgiving tidal currents of the Hudson River. The current New York Water Taxi began operation in September 2002. It started with a fleet of six yellow vessels with black and white checks. The company was born out of a vision of reclaiming New York Harbor for transportation and recreation. New York Water Taxi established its homeport at the Erie Basin in Red Hook, Brooklyn.

In addition to providing ferry service, the company also operated three temporary urban beaches in New York City. The original Water Taxi Beach in Long Island City operated from 2005 to 2010, and was designed to attract visitors to the East River waterfront and make weekend ferries serving the new residential high-rises near the Hunters Point ferry landing financially viable. The company also operated similar beaches on Governors Island and at the South Street Seaport, both of which opened in 2009.

== Vessels ==
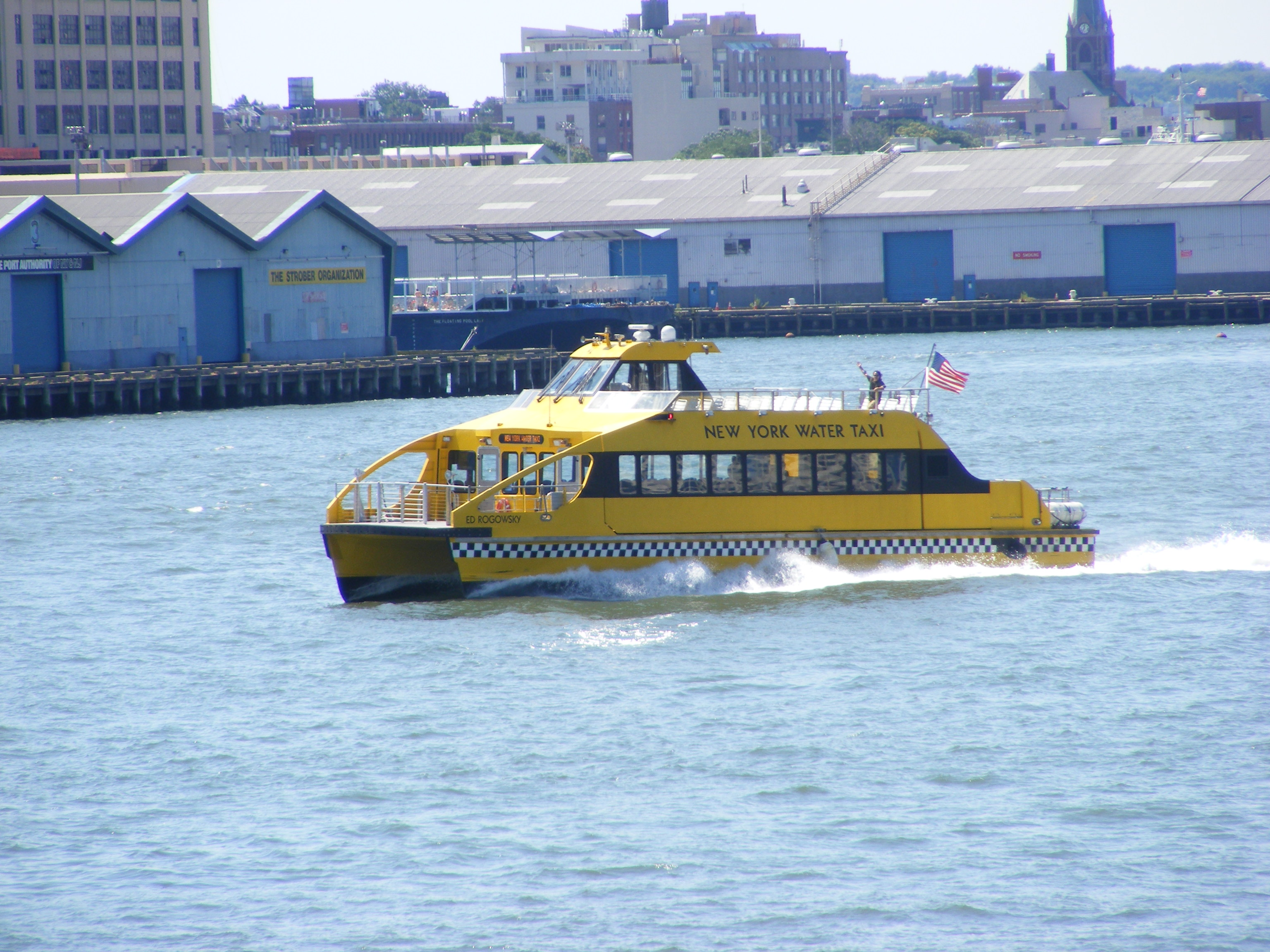
The Ed Rogowsky on the East River near Brooklyn Heights

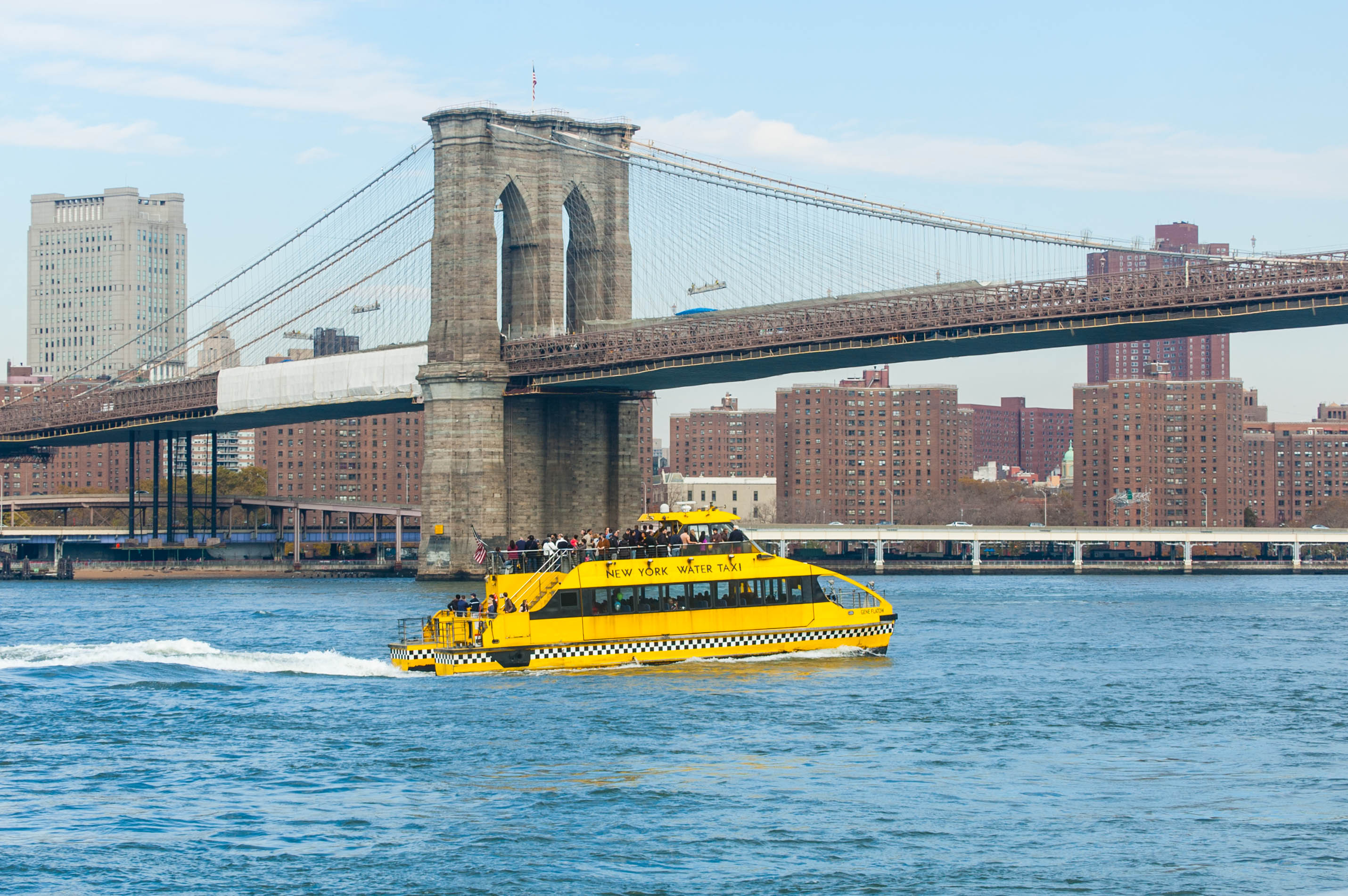
The Gene Flatow on the East River approaching the Brooklyn Bridge

New York Water Taxi operates a fleet of 10 vessels of two classes. The 67.1-foot (20.5 m) Ed Rogowsky, Gene Flatow, Marian S Heiskell, Sam Holmes, and Seymour B. Durst vessels were designed by Incat Crowther of Sydney, Australia and built from 2005 to 2008 by Gladding-Hearn Shipbuilding, and are capable of carrying up to 149 passengers at a speed of 28 knots. The 53.3-foot (16.2 m) Curt Berger, John Keith, Michael Mann, Mickey Murphy, and Schuyler Meyer Jr. were designed by Nigel Gee of Southampton, England and were built from 2002 to 2003 by Robert E. Derecktor Connecticut Shipyards, LLC, and are capable of carrying up to 74 passengers at 24 knots.

== Services ==
The New York Water Taxi can be chartered for trips around New York City and New Jersey. In addition, the company operates an employee shuttle for NYU Langone Health that runs between the East 34th Street Ferry Landing and the Brooklyn Army Terminal, providing a connection between NYU Langone's academic medical center in Manhattan and NYU Langone Hospital – Brooklyn. New York Water Taxi also operated a shuttle service from Pier 11/Wall Street to the IKEA superstore and Fairway Market, both located in Red Hook, Brooklyn; this service, branded as the "Ikea Express Shuttle", is now operated on weekends only by NY Waterway. Another service, the Statue by Night cruise, travels along the East River and around New York Harbor. Seasonal cruises include Fall Foliage, Audubon Winter and Summer EcoCruises, and New Year's Eve Family Cruises.

== Gallery ==
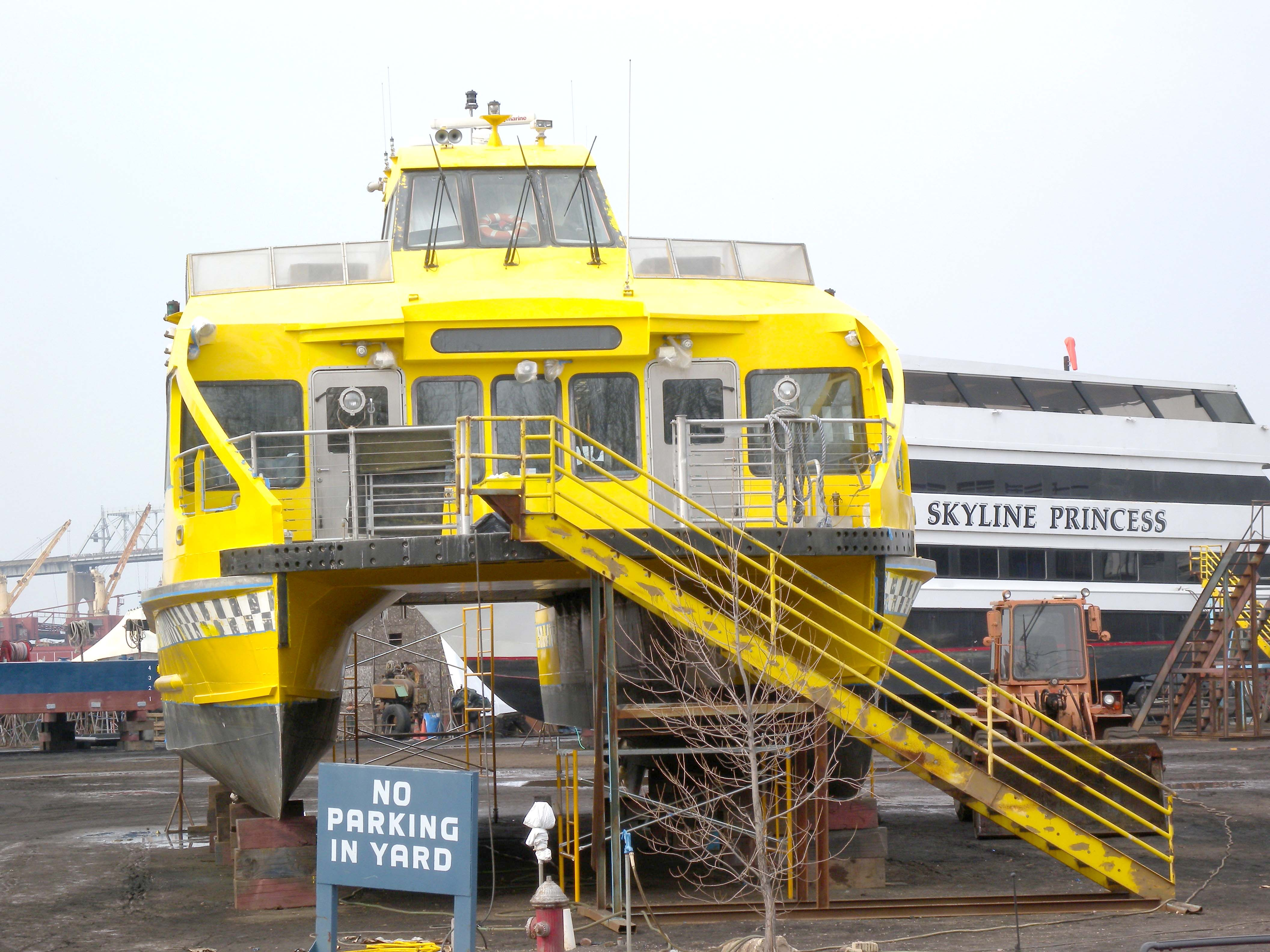
A boat drydocked at a maintenance marina in Tottenville, Staten Island

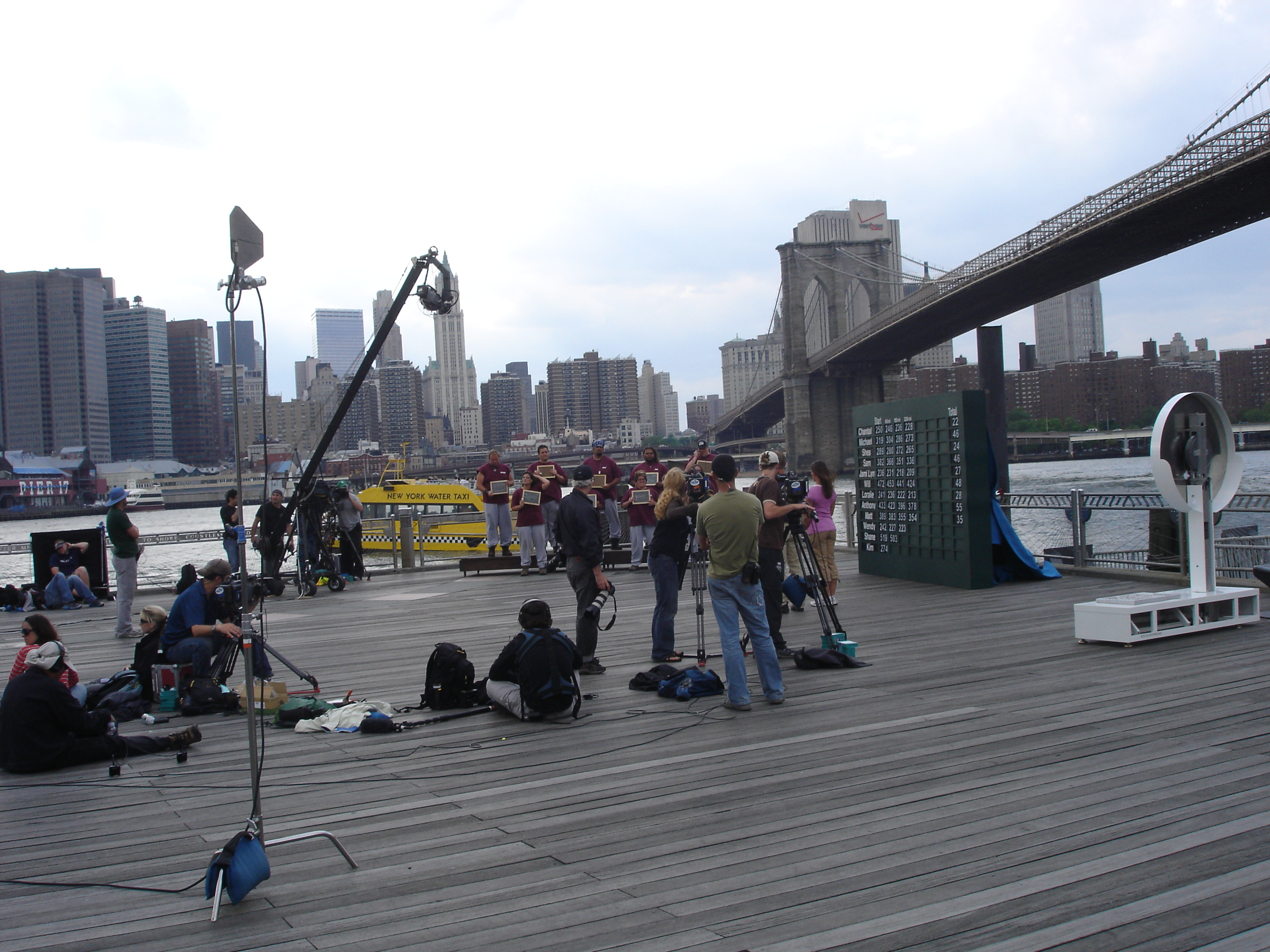
The New York Water Taxi leaves the Fulton Ferry Landing during the taping of reality TV show Fat March

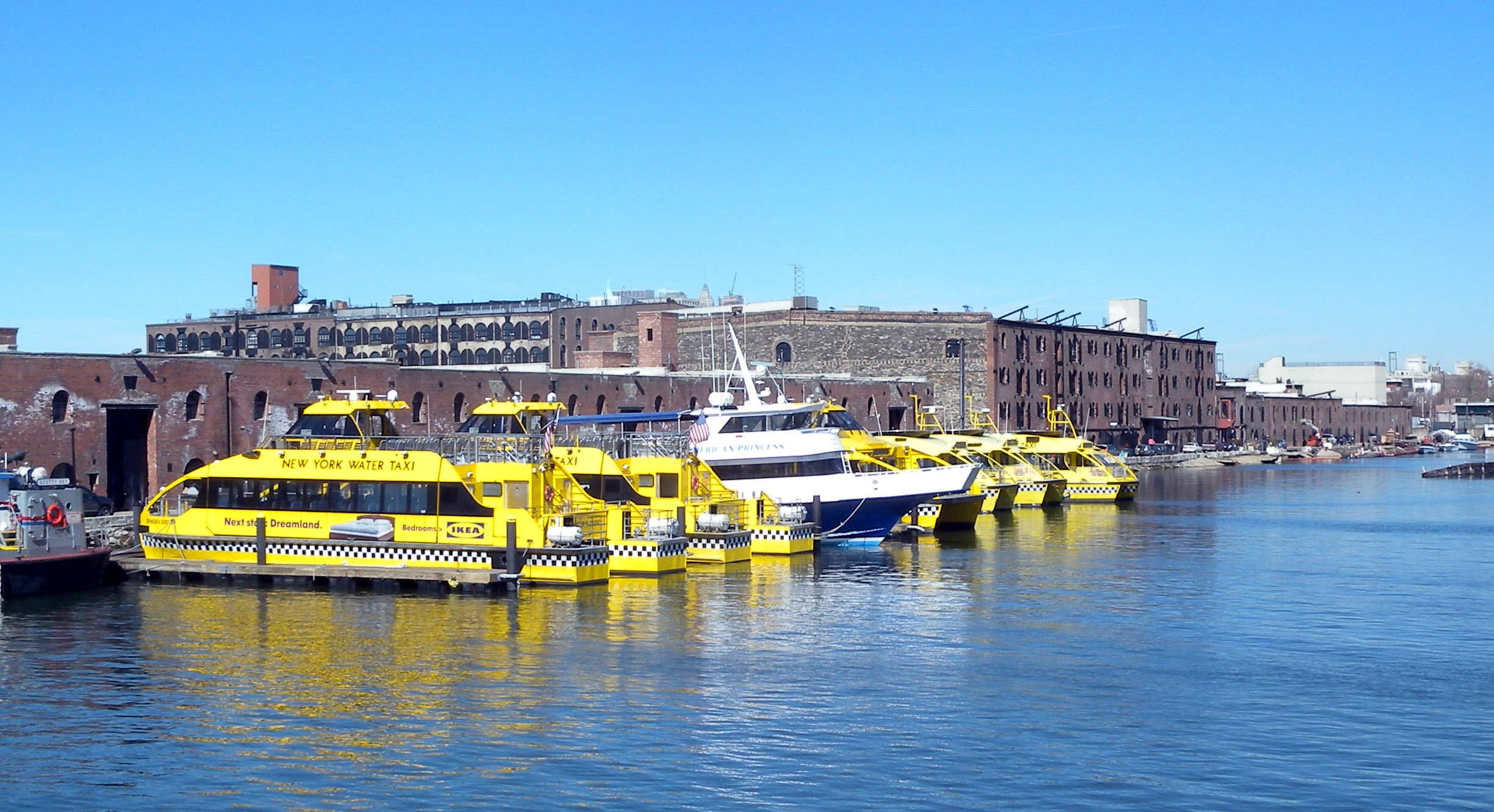
Boats moored at New York Water Taxi's storage facility in Red Hook, Brooklyn near New York Water Taxi's former ferry slip behind the Fairway Market

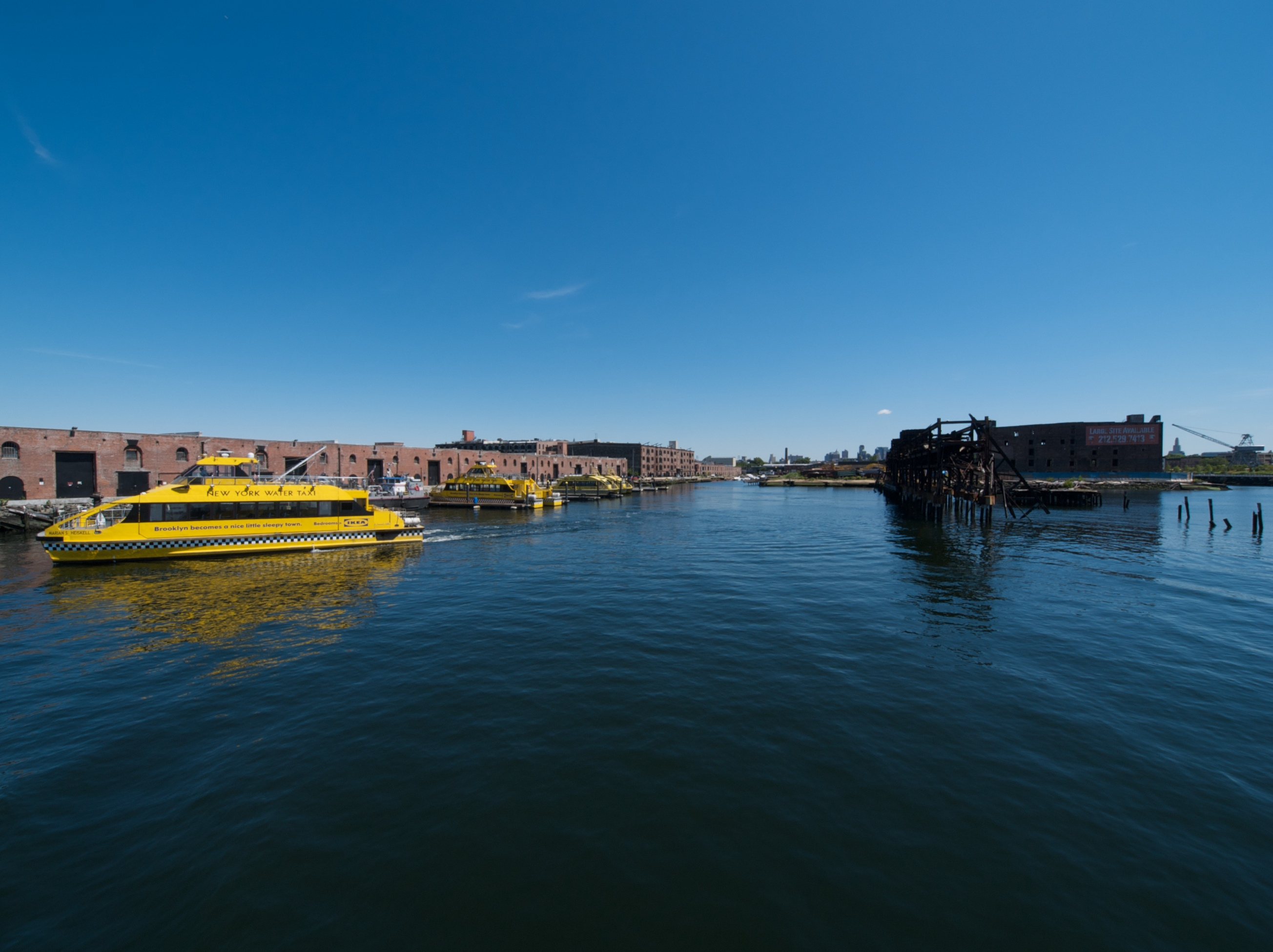
Marian S Heiskell departs the storage facility in Red Hook

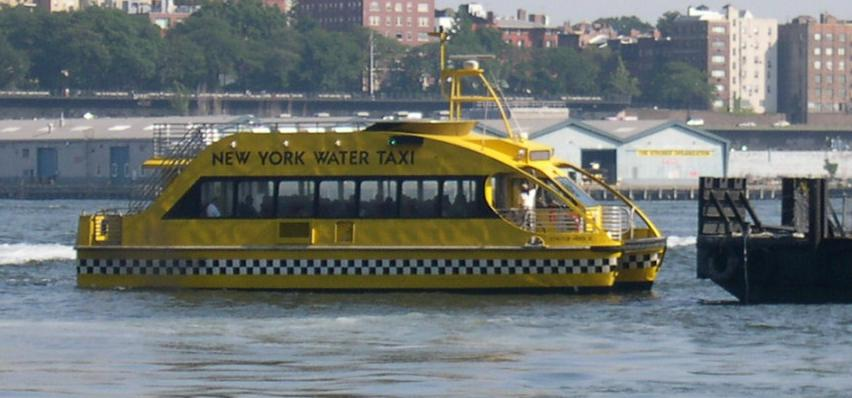
The Schuyler Meyer Jr. arriving at the Wall Street Ferry Pier

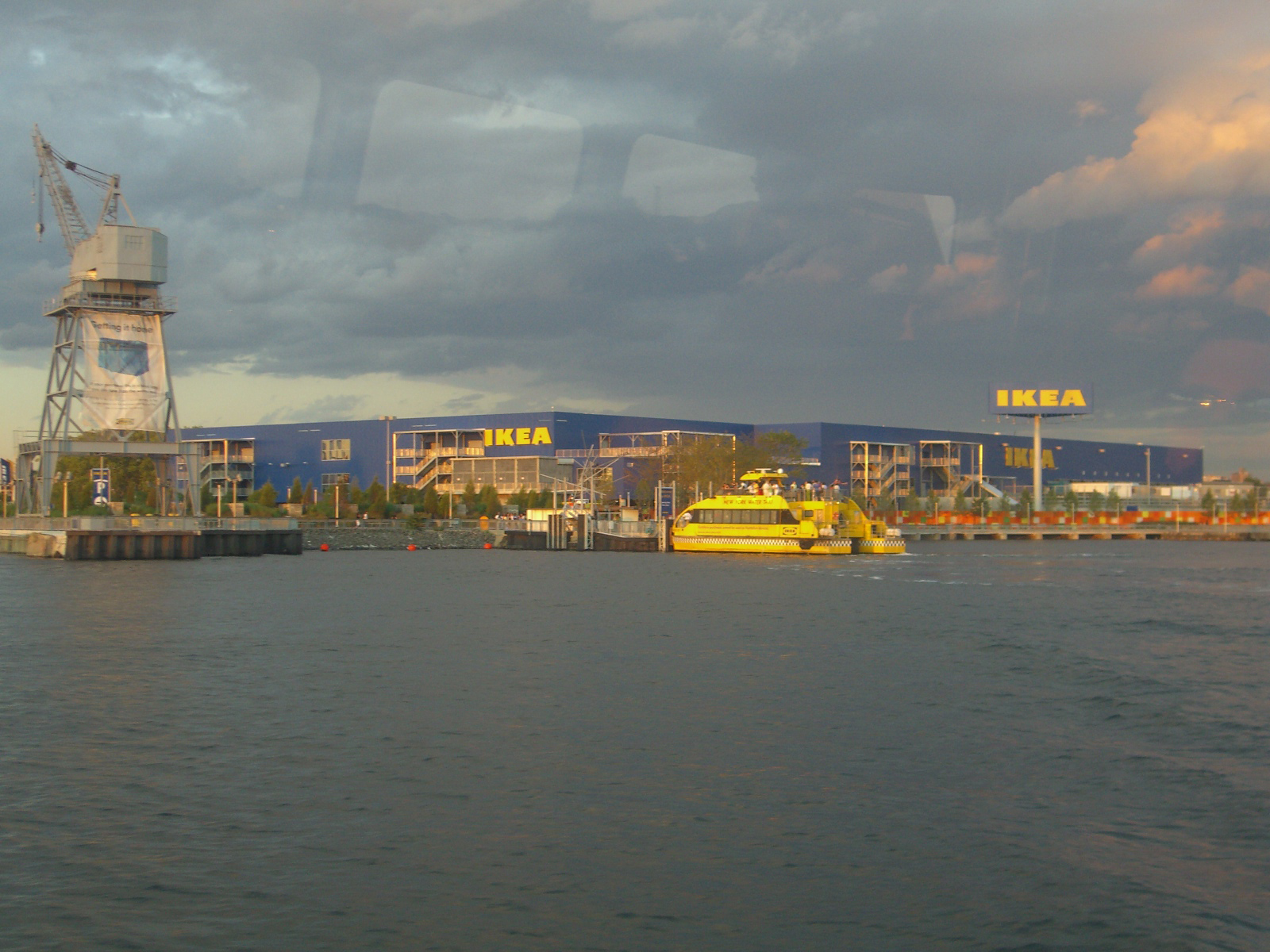
The Seymour B. Durst loading passengers at the IKEA Slip in Red Hook
