= USS Underwriter (1880) =

Tugboat of the United States Navy

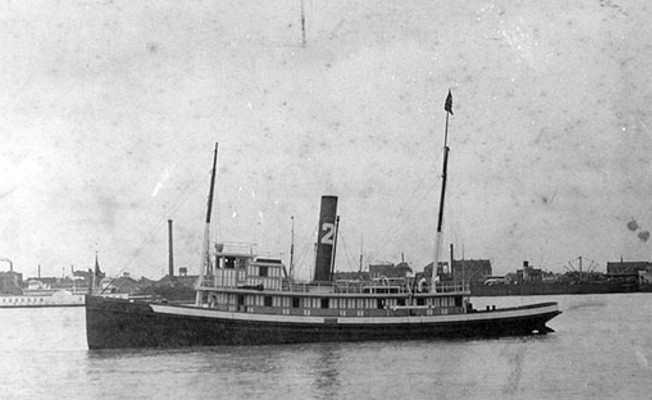
- Underwriter photographed prior to World War I, probably off New Orleans, Louisiana.

History

United States
- Name: USS Underwriter
- Builder: John H. Dialogue, Camden, New Jersey
- Laid down: 1880
- Launched: 1881
- Acquired: 1 July 1918
- Commissioned: 9 August 1918 at New Orleans
- Decommissioned: 1 March 1922
- Fate: Sold, 6 June 1922

General characteristics
- Displacement: 170 tons
- Length: 121 ft (37 m)
- Beam: 22 ft (6.7 m)
- Draft: 9 ft 3 in (2.82 m) (mean)
- Propulsion: engine, screw propelled
- Speed: 13 knots (24 km/h; 15 mph)
- Complement: 22

USS Underwriter, later renamed Adirondack, was a tugboat acquired by the U.S. Navy for duty during World War I. After the end of war, she remained on active duty performing miscellaneous tasks and services until she was decommissioned and sold in 1922.

== Service history ==
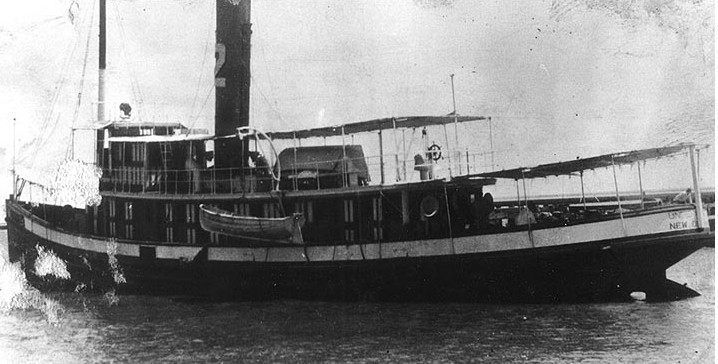
Another view of the Underwriter, later known as Adirondack in 1922.

Underwriter, an iron-hulled screw tug completed in 1881 at Camden, New Jersey, by John H. Dialogue and rebuilt in 1908, was taken over by the United States Navy at the Naval Station, New Orleans, Louisiana, on 1 July 1918 and was commissioned there on 9 August 1918. Assigned the identification number (Id. No. 1390), Underwriter operated out of the naval station at New Orleans for the duration of World War I, conducting sweeps for mines and standing ready for tug and tow services, as required. Retained in service after the cessation of hostilities, she operated as a salvage tug and as a minesweeping schoolship for the instruction of men of the U.S. Naval Reserve through 1919. Apparently, it had been contemplated to decommission Underwriter, but the damage suffered by the tug Barnett (SP-1149) on 7 June 1920, led to a reconsideration of this decision, and Underwriter remained operational as one of the tugs required at the New Orleans naval station. Barnett's crew shifted to the other tug to keep her in operation, as well as to perform upkeep on their old ship. On 17 July 1920, Underwriter was classified as a harbor tug, YT-44.

On 13 September 1920, it was recommended that if the ship was retained in service longer that her name be changed to one "more in keeping with the nomenclature adopted for the tugs belonging to the U. S. Navy." Accordingly, on 27 September, the Department authorized the change of the tug's name to Adirondack and announced it on 24 November to all concerned Bureaus. Adirondack remained employed at the Naval Station, New Orleans, into 1921. Early in the year, she "looked after" Yuma (ex-Asher J. Hudson), that tug (which had sunk on 28 October 1920) had been raised from the bottom of the waters off the naval station, until that ship was ultimately decommissioned during the ensuing summer. She also towed an Eagle-class patrol craft from Pensacola, Florida, to New Orleans, Louisiana, in January 1921. The ship's usefulness was quite apparent in mid-1921, the Commandant of the 8th Naval District desiring that Adirondack be retained in the district even after the imminent closing of the naval station at New Orleans. On 27 January 1922, it was proposed that she be transferred to the 5th Naval District, but an inspection of the ship revealed that excessively expensive repairs would be necessary to prepare her for sea. Accordingly, on 1 March 1922, Adirondack was placed out of commission. The tug was sold to B. Mitchell of New Orleans on 6 June 1922 and struck from the Navy list that same day.
