= American Princess =

American Princess may refer to:

- American Princess (2005 TV series), an American reality competition
- American Princess (2019 TV series), an American drama television series
- American Princess Cruises, an American ferry company in New Jersey and New York

== See also ==
- List of American heiresses
