= Vernon Jackson =

Vernon Jackson or Vernon-Jackson may refer to:

- Vernon Boulevard – Jackson Avenue (IRT Flushing Line), a New York City Subway station
- Gerald Vernon-Jackson, English politician for the Liberal Democrats, leader of Portsmouth City Council
- Vernon Jackson, former CEO of iGate, Inc., convicted of bribery in association with U.S. Congressman William J. Jefferson
