= Hunter's Point South =

Mixed-use development in Queens, New York

Coordinates: 40°44′22″N 73°57′40″W

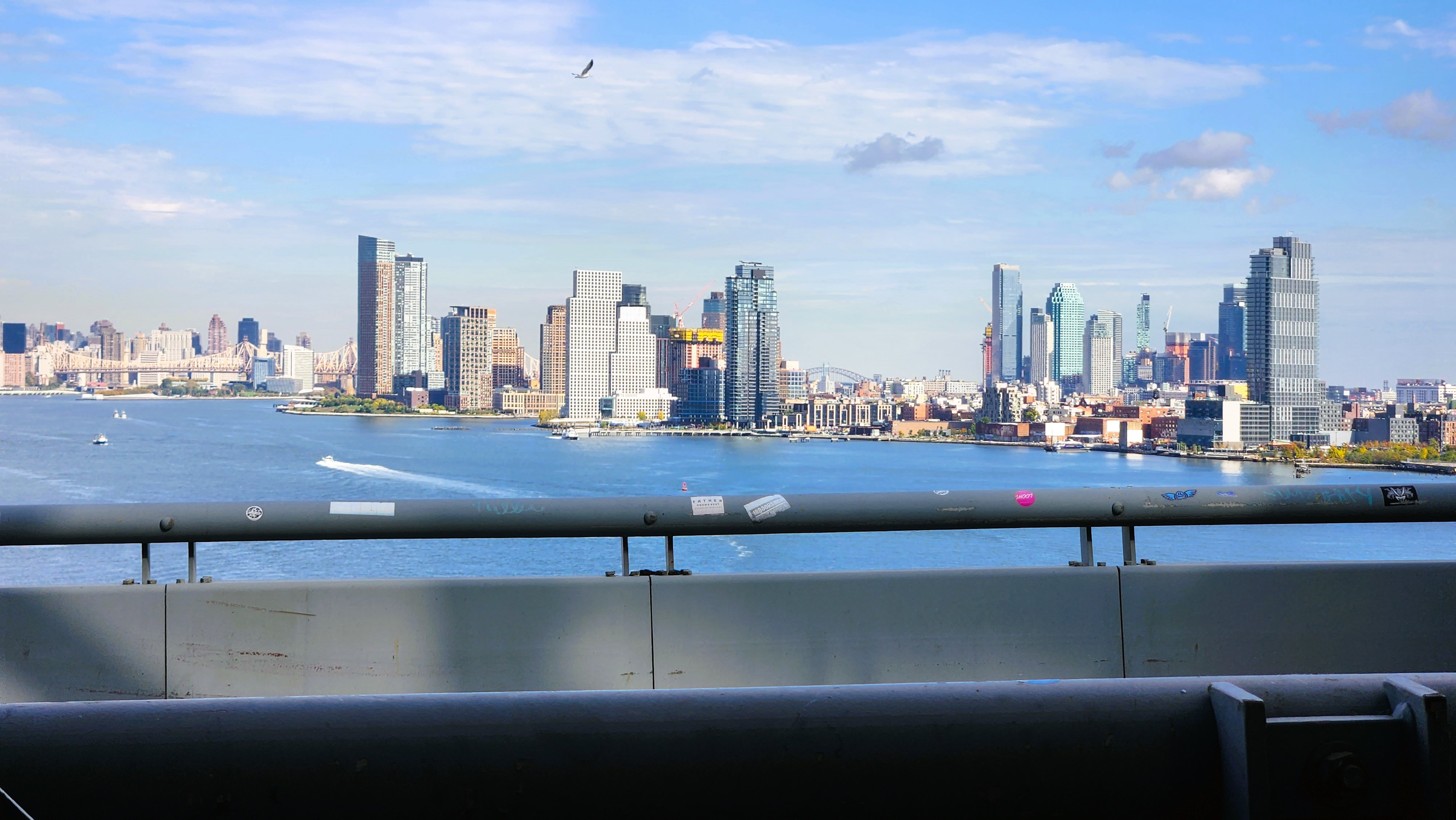
East River-Hunters Point

Hunter's Point South is a mixed-use development situated on approximately 30 acres of prime waterfront property in 30 acres (120,000 m^{2}) in Long Island City, the westernmost neighborhood of the New York City borough of Queens. Up to 5,000 housing units, 60 percent of which will be affordable to middle class, are expected to be developed on the site. As of Spring 2017, the project had attracted $2 billion from private investors.

Hunters Point South is part of the greater Queens West project and district.

== Description ==
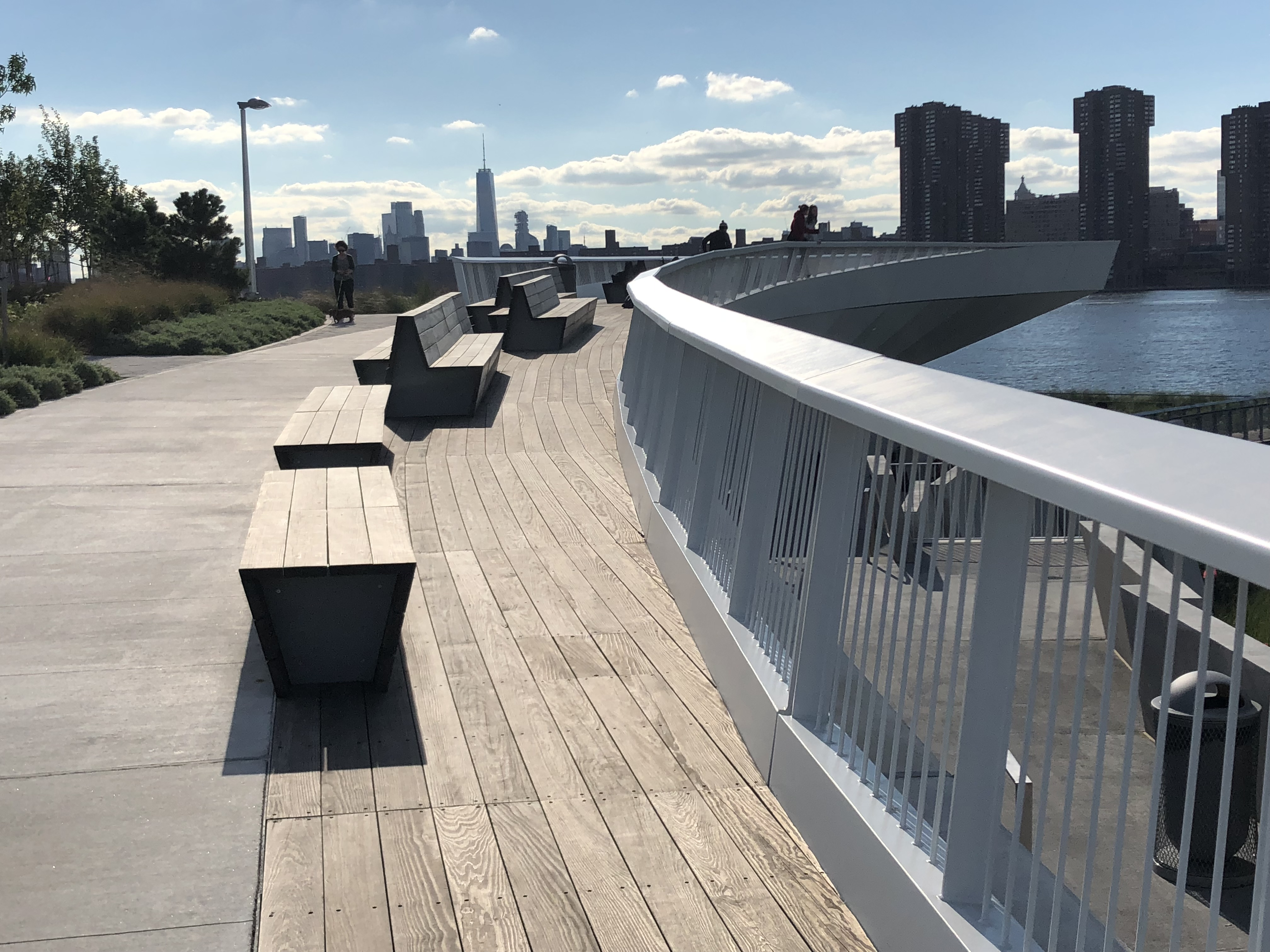
Promenade

The plan calls for a 10-year build-out of 5,000 dwelling middle-income units, 1,100-seat intermediate/high school, waterfront park of 11 acres (45,000 m^{2}), 96,500 sq ft (8,970 m^{2}) for commercial development, 4,600 sq ft (430 m^{2}) of community space. A November 2008 New York Times article reported that critics of the plan said it goes too far in benefiting middle-class households at the expense of lower-income ones, while officials countered that it is intended to address the exodus of middle-class families from the city because of rising housing costs. Only families earning between $55,000 and $158,000 would be eligible for units, although the median household income in Queens was only $51,290.

The first phase of the project will include the construction of 925 units of housing on two development parcels. Construction of the buildings, as well as the school and a portion of the waterfront park, were originally planned for mid-summer 2010. Originally, officials said that 75% of the units would be set aside for middle- to lower-income families with household incomes ranging from $32,000 to $130,000 a year for a family of four. In November 2011, it was announced that all of the units would be affordable housing. One tower will be 37 stories; the other, 32. The two towers, connected at their bases, will have commercial space at their ground floors, as well as provisions for a pre-kindergarten, a medical facility, a rock climbing wall, and restaurants. The second phase of the project, to the south of the current lot, will be even larger, with 1139 apartments, 796 of them affordable.

A ground-breaking ceremony, planned for October 2012, was delayed to March 4, 2013. The project was originally expected to finish its first phase in 2014, but was pushed back finish in 2015. The project was briefly delayed by a $13 million window procuration dispute in April 2014, but construction was quickly restarted. A Request for Proposals for the second phase of the project, which includes development of a lot south of the two buildings, was issued on May 28, 2014, for the site's infrastructure.

The Phase 1 waterfront park opened on August 27, 2013. The 1,100-seat school building in the development's Phase 1 opened in September 2013, with 52 classrooms, science labs, an auditorium, a gym, a library, and a cafeteria.

== Transportation ==
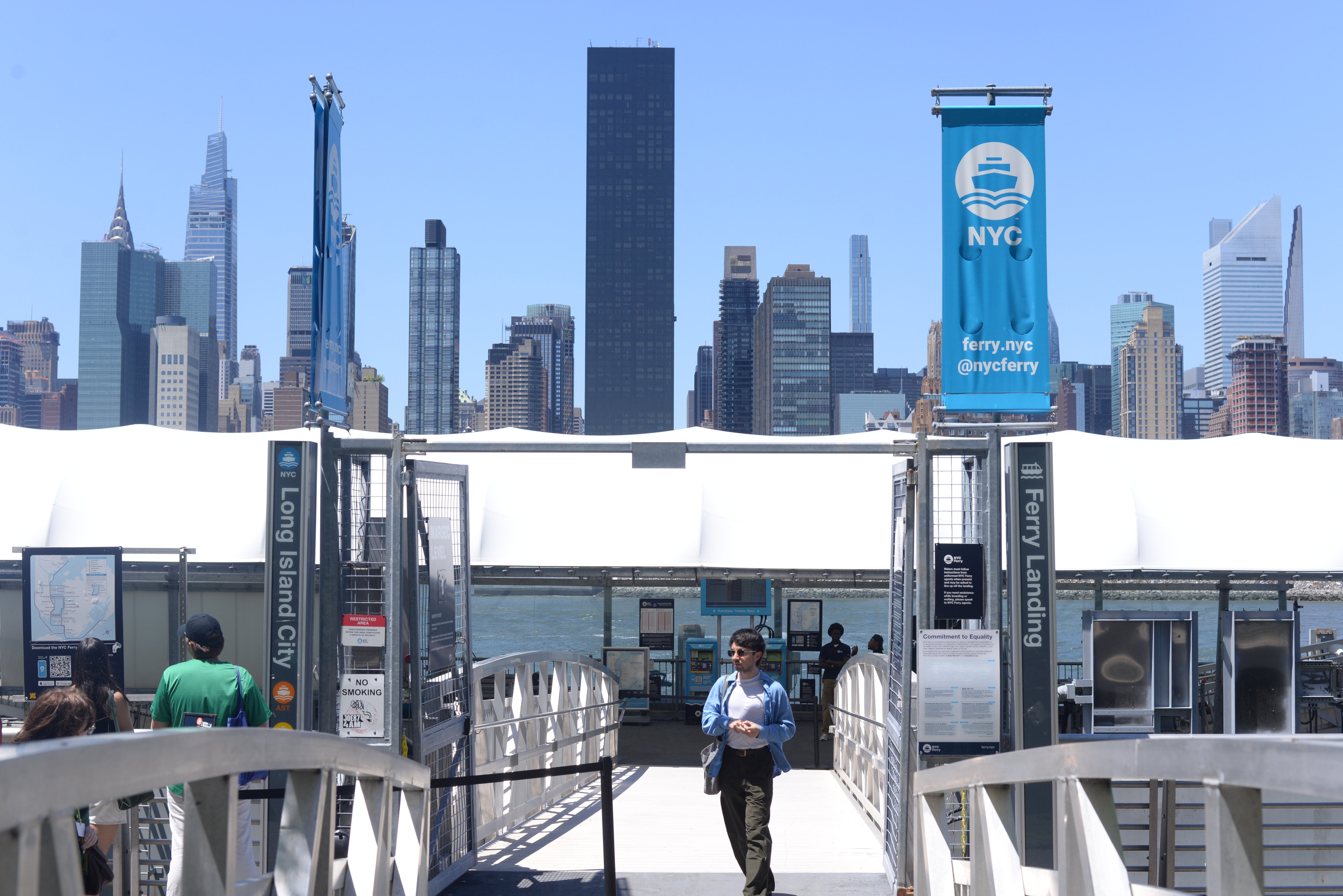
NYC Ferry stop at Long Island City

The development is served by NYC Ferry's East River Ferry. The nearest subway station is Vernon Blvd-Jackson Av on the 7 line. MTA Bus Company's Q101 and Q103 buses also serve here. The nearest LIRR station is Long Island City, only served weekday rush hours.
