= Horizon Shipbuilding =

Alabama shipyard

Horizon Shipbuilding is a shipyard located in Bayou La Batre, Alabama.

The company was founded by the Short family in 1997 after a previous shipbuilding venture failed. In 2002, Horizon declared bankruptcy after a Nigerian client failed to pay in full for several delivered vessels. After emerging from bankruptcy, control of the company passed in full to Travis R. Short, the younger of the father-son founding team. Horizon expanded its business through the 2000s, delivering vessels to defense, fishing, and towboat customers. By 2016, the company employed about 350 people and had annual revenue of between $40 and $50 million.

In July 2016, Horizon was one of two shipbuilders awarded a contract to construct new passenger ferries for the NYC Ferry service in New York City. However, during the construction of the vessels, Horizon encountered cash flow challenges and began to fall behind schedule, leading it to employ contract workers that exacerbated its financial difficulties. Horizon president Short said the company had agreed to build each vessel for $2.6 million, lower than the $3 million quoted by the other builder, Metal Shark Boats, which was insufficient to cover expenses. The company filed for bankruptcy in November 2017, citing losses incurred on the ferry construction as well as a series of tugboats that also cost more to build than expected.
