= NYC Ferry =

Ferry system in New York City

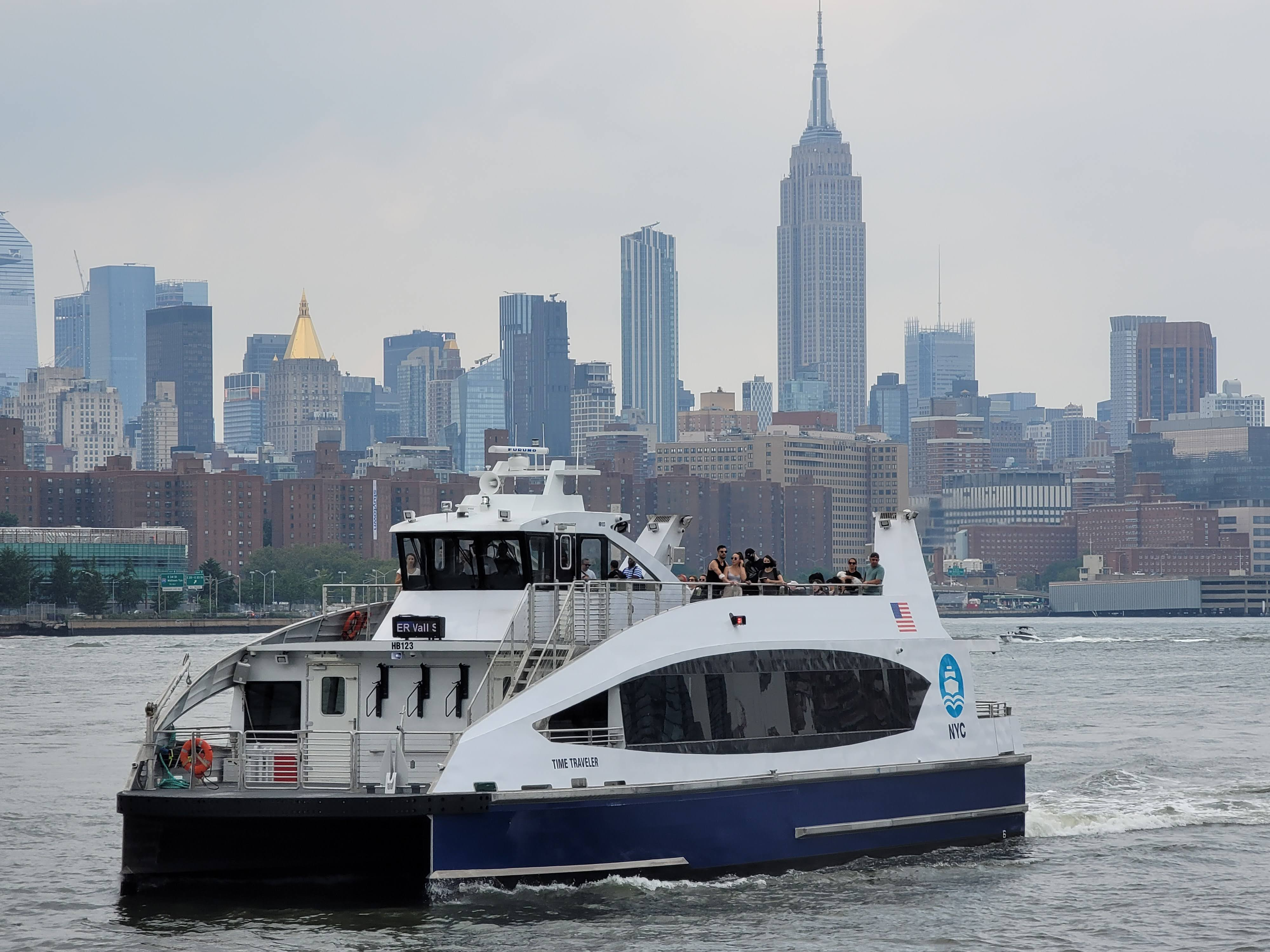
- Time Traveler on the East River, 2021
- Locale: New York City
- Waterway: New York–New Jersey Harbor Estuary
- Transit type: Passenger ferry
- Owner: New York City Economic Development Corporation
- Operator: Hornblower Cruises
- Began operation: May 1, 2017
- No. of lines: 5 year-round; 2 seasonal
- No. of vessels: 38
- No. of terminals: 25
- Yearly ridership: 7,400,000 (FY 2025)
- Website: Official website

NYC Ferry is a public network of ferry routes in New York City operated by Hornblower Cruises. As of August 2023, there are six routes, as well as one seasonal route, connecting 25 ferry piers across all five boroughs. NYC Ferry has the largest passenger fleet in the United States with a total of 38 vessels, providing between 20 and 90 minute service on each of the routes, depending on the season.

New York City had an extensive ferry network until the 1960s, when almost all ferry services were discontinued, but saw a revival in the 1980s and 1990s. During 2013 the city government officially proposed its own ferry service, which was announced two years later under the tentative name of Citywide Ferry Service. The first of two phases launched in 2017 with service along the East River and to the Rockaways, Bay Ridge, and Astoria. A second phase launched to the Lower East Side and Soundview in 2018. A ferry to St. George, Staten Island, and a stop in Throggs Neck/Ferry Point Park launched in 2021, while a proposed route to Coney Island has been postponed indefinitely as of 2022.

NYC Ferry sells both single-ride and multi-ride tickets. Free transfers are offered between routes, but there is no free transfer to other modes of transport in the city. NYC Ferry also provides free shuttle buses, connecting to ferry stops in the Rockaways and, until 2024, Midtown Manhattan. The ferry service was originally expected to transport 4.5 to 4.6 million passengers annually, but the annual ridership estimates were revised in early 2018 to 9 million. Despite its crowding, the ferry has generally received positive reviews from passengers. There has been commentary over the highly subsidized nature of the service, and NYC Ferry's low ridership compared to the city's other public transit modes.

== Background ==
=== Early ferries ===
Until the 19th century, when the first fixed crossings were put in place across the city's waterways, there were many ferries traversing the area. New York's first ferries date to when the city was a Dutch colony named New Amsterdam, which comprised modern-day Lower Manhattan. A ferry across the East River, between New Amsterdam and modern-day Brooklyn, was created in 1642 by Cornelius Dircksen, who was reportedly "the earliest ferryman of whom the records speak." By 1654, New Amsterdam's government passed ordinances to regulate East River ferries. The first ferry to New Jersey was founded in 1661, traveling across the Hudson River from Manhattan to Communipaw (now part of Jersey City). Ferries along the Harlem River, between uptown Manhattan and the Bronx, started in 1667, and a ferry to Staten Island was started in 1712. The number of ferries grew, and by 1904, there were 147 ferry services operating in New York City waters.

One of the first documented horse-powered "team" boats in commercial service in the United States was the Fulton Ferry Company, an East River ferry run that Robert Fulton implemented in 1814. The South Ferry Company, founded in 1836, merged with the Fulton Ferry Company three years later, and the combined companies underwent a series of acquisitions, eventually owning many of the East River ferries. However, by 1918, the construction of bridges and New York City Subway tunnels across the East River resulted in some companies, such as the New York and East River Ferry Company between Yorkville and Astoria, operating at a loss. Even with city ownership, many of the East River ferries were superseded by bridges, road tunnels, and subway tunnels by the mid-20th century. The Yorkville–Astoria ferry, for instance, stopped in 1936 after being replaced by the Triborough Bridge.

On the other side of Manhattan, there were a myriad of Hudson River ferries at one point, with boat routes running from New Jersey to twenty passenger docks in Manhattan. However, the construction of the Holland Tunnel, Lincoln Tunnel, Hudson & Manhattan Railroad, Pennsylvania Railroad and George Washington Bridge between Manhattan and New Jersey, as well as the growth of car ownership in the United States, meant that these ferries were no longer needed by the mid-20th century. As a result, in 1967, the last cross-Hudson ferry (between Hoboken and Battery Park City) ceased operations.

The Richmond Turnpike Company started a steamboat service from Manhattan to Staten Island in 1817. Cornelius Vanderbilt bought the company in 1838, and it was sold to the Staten Island Railroad Company in 1864. The Staten Island Ferry was then sold to the Baltimore and Ohio Railroad in 1884, and the City of New York assumed control of the ferry in 1905. The ferry, which still operates, was at one point the only commuter ferry within the entire city, after the discontinuation of the Hoboken ferry in 1967.

Despite the discontinuation of ferry service to New Jersey, people moved to locations along the Hudson River waterfront there. In 1986, waterfront settlements like Bayonne, Highlands, Keyport, Port Liberte, and Weehawken saw a reinstatement of their ferry service to Manhattan, under the operation of NY Waterway. By 1989, around 3,000 of the settlements' combined 10,500 residents paid a $5.00 fare in each direction to board the NY Waterway ferries, despite competition from cheaper alternatives like the PATH train system. Around this time, there were plans to create ferry routes between Inwood and Atlantic City; South Amboy and Wall Street; and from the city proper to New Jersey, Connecticut, and Westchester.

=== Revival of ferries ===
In early 2011, the New York City Economic Development Corporation (NYCEDC), and the NYC & Company water travel initiative NYHarborWay, worked with the New York City Department of Transportation (NYCDOT) to release a Comprehensive Citywide Ferry Study, in which it examined over 40 potential locations for a ferry system in New York City. The study was commissioned in order to examine transport alternatives for neighborhoods along New York City's shores. It also discussed the East River Ferry, which was set to enter service later that year. The study identified potential ferry routes to western Manhattan and Riverdale; eastern Manhattan, the South Bronx, and Co-op City; the northern Brooklyn and Queens shorelines; the South Shore of Staten Island; and southwestern Brooklyn, southern Brooklyn, and the Rockaways.

==== East River and Rockaway ferries ====
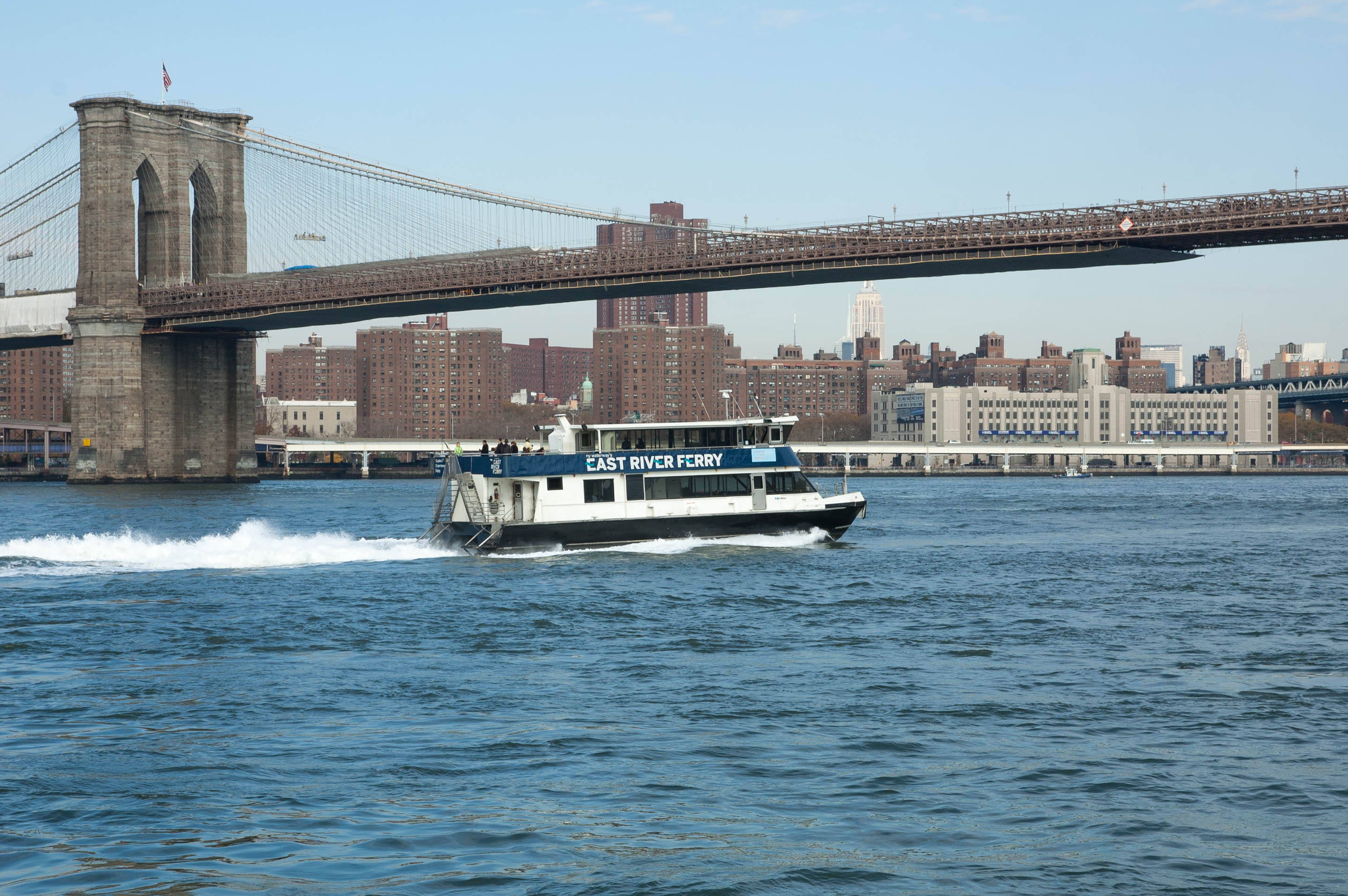
NYC Ferry's East River line in its former NY Waterway livery

In June 2011, the NY Waterway-operated East River Ferry line started operations. The route was a 7-stop East River service that ran from Pier 11 to East 34th Street, making four intermediate stops in Brooklyn and one in Queens. The ferry, an alternative to the New York City Subway, cost $4 per one-way ticket (the subway at the time cost $2.25). It was instantly popular, with two to six times the number of passengers that the city predicted would ride the ferries. From June to November 2011, the ferry accommodated 2,862 riders on an average weekday, as opposed to a projection of 1,488 riders, and it had 4,500 riders on an average weekend, six times the city's projected ridership; in total, the ferry saw 350,000 riders in that period, over 250% of the initial ridership forecast of 134,000 riders.

In the aftermath of Hurricane Sandy on October 29, 2012, massive infrastructural damage to the IND Rockaway Line (A train) south of the Howard Beach–JFK Airport station severed all direct subway connections between the Rockaways, Broad Channel, and the Queens mainland for seven months. Ferry operator SeaStreak began running a city-subsidized ferry service between a makeshift ferry slip at Beach 108th Street and Beach Channel Drive in Rockaway Park, Queens, and Pier 11/Wall Street, then continuing on to the East 34th Street Ferry Landing. A stop at Brooklyn Army Terminal was added in August 2013 because of the reconstruction of the Montague Street Tunnel, which temporarily suspended R train service through the tunnel. The ferry proved to be popular and its license was extended several times, as city officials evaluated the ridership numbers to determine whether to establish the service on a permanent basis. Between its inception and December 2013, the service had carried close to 200,000 riders.

The NYCEDC study was updated in 2013, following the introduction of the SeaStreak Rockaway ferry. The study, called "CFS2013", showed the effect of ferry services in New York City, citing the success of the East River ferry. Specifically, ferry service raised the values of real estate within 1 mile (1.6 km) of ferry landings by an average of 1.2%; spurred new construction near ferry stops; added more transport options; and helped relieve crowding on other parts of New York City's transport network. The study also suggested extra routes that could be added to serve all five boroughs. The specific idea of a citywide ferry was also first proposed in the study. When the city government announced its budget in late June 2014 for the upcoming fiscal year beginning July 1, the Rockaway ferry only received a $2 million further appropriation, enough to temporarily extend it again through October. The administration of Mayor Bill de Blasio stated that there was not enough ridership to justify the cost of operation. Despite last-minute advocacy, ferry service ended on October 31, 2014, and supporters continued to try to restore ferry service. The mayor's office eventually agreed to restart the Rockaway ferry when the NYC Ferry system opened.

==== Staten Island to Midtown fast ferry ====
By the late 1980s, ferries had again become a popular mode of transport in the New York City area. A ferry line from Staten Island to Midtown Manhattan was proposed in the early 1990s; this new ferry would travel at top speeds of 35 knots (65 km/h; 40 mph). New York Fast Ferry was ultimately selected to run a ferry from St. George on Staten Island to East 34th Street in Midtown Manhattan; it opened in January 1997 and saw about 1,650 commuters a day. The Midtown ferry proved successful until the city made the New York City Department of Transportation (NYCDOT)'s Staten Island Ferry fare-free in mid-1997. As a result, daily ridership on the $5-per-ticket Midtown ferry decreased to 400 passengers, and New York Fast Ferry was unable to make a profit on the route. New York Fast Ferry went out of business at the end of 1997, at which point NY Waterway took over the route. NY Waterway also failed to break even on the Midtown route, and it was eliminated on July 31, 1998.

In 2013, city councilman James Oddo advocated for a revival of fast ferry service to Staten Island as part of his campaign to become that borough's president. After Oddo's election as borough president, he pushed New York City mayor Bill de Blasio to consider a Staten Island fast ferry as part of what would become NYC Ferry. At the time, the system's only proposed ferry stop on Staten Island was at Stapleton, but funding for the Stapleton route was later withdrawn. When NYC Ferry eventually opened in 2017 (see NYC Ferry § Opening and high ridership), politicians and Staten Island residents again advocated bringing more ferry service to Staten Island, including adding one ferry each to Manhattan and Brooklyn, a stop on the South Shore, and extra stops on the NYCDOT's Staten Island Ferry line. In April 2017, Oddo announced a tentative agreement with NY Waterway to possibly implement a fast route from St. George to Midtown Manhattan in 2018. The ferry would go to West Midtown Ferry Terminal, as opposed to East 34th Street, and would not have received any per-passenger subsidies from the city. By September 2017, private developers on the South Shore were also negotiating with SeaStreak to run a separate fast ferry route from the South Shore to Lower Manhattan.

== Development ==
=== Proposal and planning ===
NYC Ferry, first proposed by the NYCEDC as the "Citywide Ferry Service," was announced by de Blasio's administration in 2015 as part of a proposed citywide ferry system that would reach through the five boroughs, though a Staten Island terminal had not been finalized. The NYCEDC promised the project, along with the Brooklyn–Queens Connector proposal, as a way to reinvent the city's transit system. Routes were to go to Astoria, Bay Ridge, the Rockaways, the Lower East Side, Soundview, South Brooklyn, and Brooklyn Navy Yard. NY Waterway's East River route was to be transferred to NYC Ferry system as part of the plan. Funding was being sought for a route to Coney Island and Stapleton, but it was not included in NYC Ferry's implementation timeline.

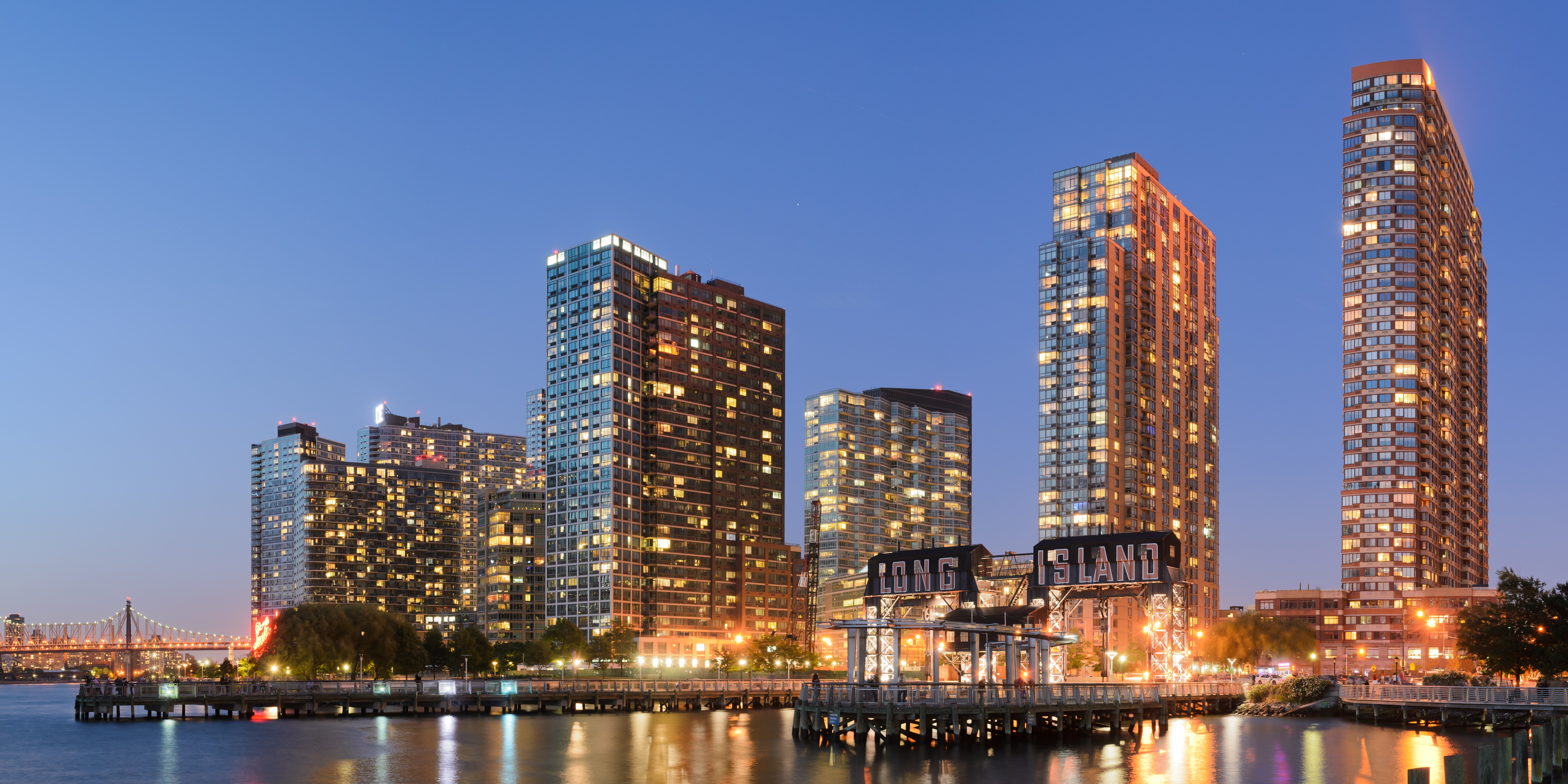
The future site of a NYC Ferry landing at Gantry Plaza in Long Island City

A fare for one trip was set at $2.75, the same as on other modes of transportation in New York City. Free transfers would be offered only to other NYC Ferry lines, meaning that riders would pay another fare if they transferred to one of the city's other mass-transit systems. Transfers to other lines would be issued on request. Prior to the implementation of NYC Ferry, other ferry lines in the city had weekday and weekend fares of $4 and $6, respectively. The relatively low fare of NYC Ferry was made in contrast to some other major cities like San Francisco and Sydney, where ferry fares are higher than the fares of other modes of mass transit in these cities. The city said that the low ferry fares were intended to make the ferries affordable, while de Blasio stated that it is intended to promote "transit equity". Assuming that the ferry system met the projection of 4.5 million annual riders, the city would pay a subsidy of $6.60 per rider, making the ferry the third-most subsidized form of transportation in the city, after the express bus service and the Long Island Rail Road.

NYC Ferry was to cost $325 million with the city contributing an additional operating subsidy of $10 million to $20 million per year. The privately operated ferries were offered under a 6-year contract to Hornblower Cruises, which would receive at least $30 million annually during the course of the contract. After having accepted the contract, Hornblower Cruises was selected as the ferry's operator on March 16, 2016.

Some of the ferry's six proposed routes were originally supposed to be operational in June 2017, but the implementation date was later moved to May 1. Under the 2015 plan, the whole system was expected to come into full service by 2018. The system includes routes that were formerly under NY Waterway, most notably the East River route. There would be at least 18 boats needed for rush-hour operation. Twelve boats would be deployed in 2017, while the other six would be put in service the next year. The number of boats was later revised slightly to 20, including three boats that would be upgraded later. The creation of the ferry system was supposed to relieve some of the load of the city's transportation system, which is largely "the footprint of an early-19th-century transit map" according to Deputy Mayor Alicia Glen, and cannot accommodate the city's fast population growth. As a result of projected desire for the ferries, annual ridership was expected to eventually reach 4.5 million to 4.6 million. Even though this amounted to only about 12,500 daily riders (compared to the New York City Subway's 5 million riders each weekday), one fellow at the Manhattan Institute said that "every person you're not cramming on to the trains helps". New York City's deputy mayor for housing and economic development stated, "Our aim is to make this thing as big as possible."

In March and April 2015, the city started the process of environmental review for Citywide Ferry. The city requested the draft of the Environmental Impact Statement (EIS) on August 12, 2015, which was completed by April 18, 2016. After public comment, the final EIS was approved on July 28, 2016. The project also had a City Environmental Quality Review, which analyzed the ferry's effects on open space, urban design, natural resources, nearby transportation, noise pollution, air quality, the environment, and public health.

=== Construction ===
From January to June 2016, the city bought 4 boats for the proposed ferry service for a combined total of $6 million, with plans for a total of 30 boats over the coming years. Hornblower Cruises requested 13 boats for the first routes, each costing $4 million. The total combined cost of the boats is more than $70 million. In addition, the city was building 13 ferry landings at a cost of $85 million, as well as a boat depot. One of these docks, in Astoria, was built privately as part of the Astoria Cove development. In September 2016, construction on 19 ferries began at two shipyards in Bayou La Batre, Alabama, and Jeanerette, Louisiana, with 200 full-time employees working on the boats. The contract with the two shipyards is unusual because shipbuilding contracts are usually with only one company. However, NYC Ferry executives had purposely chosen these two companies because of their expertise and because of the unlikeliness that both shipyards would be destroyed by hurricanes.

Ferry implementation required permission from several entities. Before the ferry could start service, the NYCDOT was required to approve a new transportation mode within its service area. Additionally, the New York State Department of Environmental Conservation and United States Army Corps of Engineers (CoE) was supposed to give NYC Ferry permission to use of the landings, with the United States Coast Guard advising the CoE's approval of a permit as well as monitoring the design of vessels. In addition, the New York State Office of Parks, Recreation and Historic Preservation had to allow ferries to use the landing at Gantry Plaza State Park, and the Roosevelt Island Operating Corporation was consulted so they could give permission for the Roosevelt Island landing to be built. By September 2016, the Gantry Plaza landing had been approved.

In December 2016, Hornblower purchased the rights to operate the East River route for $21 million. The route had been operated by Billybey Ferries, which had a contract to operate the line under the NY Waterway banner. As part of the sale, Hornblower paid $6 million for four older boats already in use on the East River ferry.

The first completed new vessel left the Bayou La Batre facility on around March 24, 2017, and it arrived in New York on April 2, 2017. On April 6, Mayor de Blasio announced that the service had been rebranded from Citywide Ferry to NYC Ferry, and that the start of service had been moved up a month from the original schedule, with the East River, South Brooklyn, and Rockaway routes to begin on May 1, a month ahead of schedule. Under the new schedule, the South Brooklyn route began on June 1 and the Astoria route began on August 29, while the Lower East Side and Soundview routes were still to begin in 2018.

== Operation and expansion ==
=== Opening and high ridership ===
The first two routes were opened on May 1, 2017. On its first day of service, NYC Ferry saw more than 6,400 riders; of these, 1,828 rode the Rockaway ferry while the rest rode the East River Ferry. In its first week, the ferry transported 49,000 riders, of which 38,000 used the East River Ferry while the remaining 11,000 used the Rockaway route. Although the service had a 95% on-time rate during the first week, NYC Ferry chartered a boat from NY Waterway due to delays on some routes. NYC Ferry also continued to temporarily use some of the older East River Ferry boats on that route. The ferry grew so popular that during the Memorial Day weekend in May 2017, the routes saw 26,000 passengers over two days, including 9,600 riders on the East River Ferry during each day. Described by The New York Times as the service's "biggest test so far", the 2017 Memorial Day weekend saw reports of hour-long waits for overcrowded ferries.

In June, NYC Ferry had to charter two 400-passenger charter boats for the East Ferry route to alleviate crowding on the routes serving Governors Island while packed boats skipped stops along these routes. By June 22, the ferry had carried 500,000 passengers, a milestone officials had not expected to be reached for several months. Due to unexpected demand, crowding became worse as the summer of 2017 progressed, with packed-to-capacity boats and long waits becoming more common. By July 2017, there were an estimated 83,500 riders on the South Brooklyn route in one month, exceeding the original ridership estimate by more than 30,000. The East River ferry saw about 7,200 riders per average weekday since being taken over by NYC Ferry, up from 3,257 average weekday riders in 2013. That month, three new boats being built were also revised to fit more passengers. A 500-passenger boat was also borrowed from SeaStreak for the Rockaway route. By July 26, 2017, NYC Ferry had carried 1 million riders.

In August 2017, NYC Ferry filed plans to build four ferry docks: one in Soundview, one in Yorkville, one near Stuyvesant Cove, and one on the Lower East Side. It also sought to add two more piers to its home port at the Brooklyn Navy Yard. The Soundview route was revised so that it would stop at East 34th Street instead of at East 62nd Street, which would no longer be built. That month, Brooklyn politicians called for docks to be built in Coney Island and Canarsie, owing to the new system's popularity. The Astoria route was projected to carry 1,800 daily passengers upon opening, by which point the service had seen 1.4 million riders. Due to even more ridership demand, three extra ferries were ordered in September 2017, by which time over 2 million people had ridden the ferry. By November 2017, there had been a total of 2.5 million rides on NYC Ferry, compared to the 1.8 million that had been projected by this time, and two of the four routes had already surpassed ridership milestones that the city had not anticipated would be reached until 2019. At that point, the city had spent $16.5 million to subsidize the ferry. The New York Post reported in November 2017 that five of the new ferryboats had already been taken out of service due to leaks. According to the Post, the boats were taken out of service starting in October after Coast Guard inspectors observed severe corrosion on the hulls. Hornblower subsequently confirmed the report, saying that the cause of the corrosion was misaligned keel coolers, and that three vessels had been removed from service in October for repair, followed by three more in November.

Construction on the four remaining NYC Ferry docks in Manhattan and the Bronx started on February 28, 2018, in preparation for the start of Lower East Side and Soundview service that summer. In May 2018, the first anniversary of the ferry system's opening, de Blasio announced that NYC Ferry had received an extra $300 million to purchase extra boats, increase fleet capacity, and expand service. The number of new boats was not specified, but it was expected that there would be a mix of standard 150-passenger boats and large 350-passenger boats; as a stopgap, Hornblower would charter up to eight 500-passenger boats for temporary use on NYC Ferry. At this point, the city planned that the service would see 9 million riders per year, double the original annual estimate of 4.5 million riders. However, critics stated that the MTA's subway and bus systems carried a combined 7 million passengers per day, and that such a large subsidy for NYC Ferry was disproportionate to the number of people who rode the ferry. According to The Village Voice, NYC Ferry was aiming to transport 24,500 daily riders by 2023, a figure smaller than the 2017 daily ridership of 14 local bus routes. NYC Ferry had averaged 10,000 daily riders in 2017, while the bus and subway system had respectively carried 2 million and 5 million daily riders on average.

=== 2010s ===
In August 2018, it was announced that service on NYC Ferry's Soundview and Lower East Side routes would begin that month. The route to Soundview opened on August 15, 2018, followed by the Lower East Side route on August 29. New York City Transit extended select Bx27 bus trips to Clason Point Park to serve the Soundview route in mid-2018.

Following the opening of the Lower East Side route in August 2018, de Blasio stated that he planned for the system to expand further. In January 2019, de Blasio announced further expansions to the NYC Ferry system to take place by 2021. There would be two new routes to Staten Island and Coney Island, as well as extensions of two additional routes. The Staten Island route would travel between Manhattan's West Side and the St. George Terminal in St. George, Staten Island, and was originally slated to open in 2020, but was pushed back to 2021. The Coney Island route would travel between Pier 11 Wall Street and Coney Island, and would start operating in 2021. The Astoria route would make an extra stop at Brooklyn Navy Yard, while the Soundview route would be extended from Soundview east to Throggs Neck. The South Brooklyn route would terminate at Brooklyn Army Terminal, and the existing Bay Ridge ferry pier would be served by the Coney Island route. The Brooklyn Navy Yard stop opened on May 20, 2019. The same month, NYC Ferry launched a new weekend-only shuttle from Pier 11/Wall Street to Governors Island, replacing the East River and South Brooklyn service to the island.

The service expansion required that the city increase its per-rider subsidy to $8. In March 2019, the nonprofit Citizens Budget Commission (CBC) found that NYC Ferry was one of the most subsidized forms of transport in New York City, despite having low ridership. The CBC found that the city paid $10.73 per person per ride, and once the Coney Island route started operating, the subsidy to NYC Ferry would rise to $25 per person per ride. The per-ride subsidy was so high because NYC Ferry had only 4.1 million passengers in 2018, less than the total subway patronage on an average weekday. Furthermore, NYC Ferry ridership tended to decline by two-thirds between August and January of each year. In January 2020, the NYCEDC announced three minor changes to the expansion plan. The St. George ferry's Staten Island terminal would be Empire Outlets rather than St. George Terminal; the South Brooklyn route would be truncated to a new stop at Industry City; and the Coney Island ferry would go directly between Bay Ridge and Wall Street without a stop at the Brooklyn Army Terminal.

=== Early 2020s ===
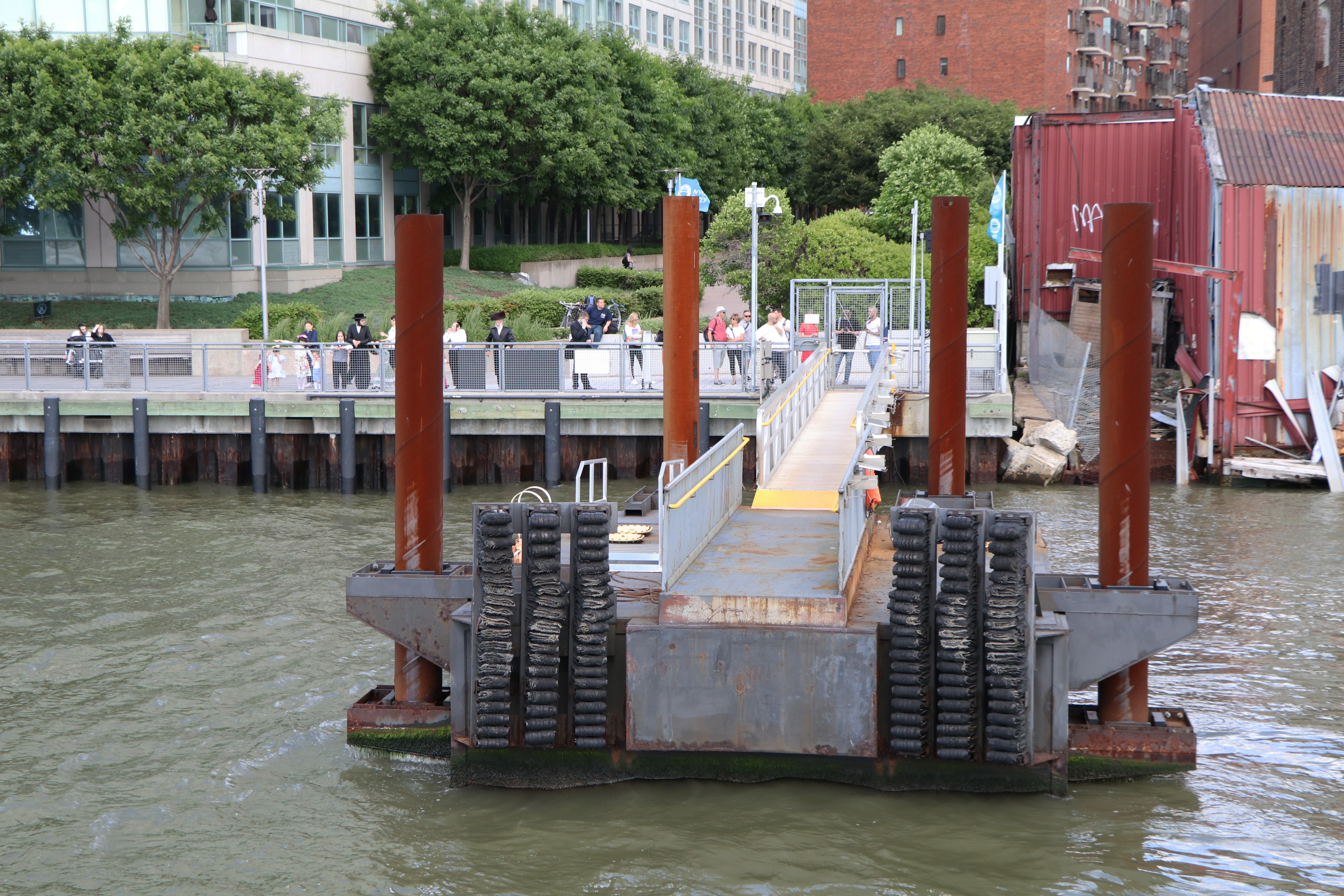
Articulated gangway at the South Williamsburg landing

On May 18, 2020, service was reduced, all ferry service ending at 9 p.m., with the discontinuation of the Lower East Side route, the addition of the Stuyvesant Cove stop to the Soundview line, and the modification of the South Brooklyn route to run from Atlantic Avenue to Wall Street, Dumbo, and to its new last stop at Corlears Hook. The ferry to Staten Island would not be implemented until 2021, along with the Coney Island and Throggs Neck expansions. On June 27, 2020, the summer schedule was implemented, increasing frequency of all routes except for the Governors Island route, which remained indefinitely suspended until July 18. Shortly after, de Blasio budgeted $62 million for eight new vessels. On August 22, 2020, the Astoria route was extended to 90th Street and the Rockaway route received a schedule modification. On November 2, 2020, the East River route was extended north to Hunters Point South, with the previous northern terminal, East 34th Street, becoming the second to last stop.

Throughout 2021, numerous stops experienced periodic closures due to mechanical failures, according to AM New York Metro's analysis of announcements on NYC Ferry's Twitter account. In April 2021, the Dumbo ferry landing was closed for eight to ten weeks so it could be relocated to Fulton Ferry, and the South Williamsburg landing was closed for the same amount of time for expansion. The Greenpoint landing was temporarily closed in October 2020 because the pier had been sold, and it was closed again in May 2021 due to a mechanical issue; it did not reopen until November 2022. The St. George route began operating on August 23, 2021. Further expansion of the ferry network on Staten Island was not planned at that time; in places like the East Shore and South Shore of Staten Island, any new construction would potentially require building a dock of at least 1,000 feet (300 m) due to shallow waters there. Work on the Coney Island ferry pier had begun by October 2021. The Throggs Neck ferry stop opened on December 28, 2021, with the Soundview route being extended there.

In mid-2022, the EDC announced that the Coney Island ferry route had been postponed indefinitely. One problem was that the sand in the Coney Island Creek shifted frequently, hampering efforts to construct a ferry pier there. Another issue was that the creek itself was heavily polluted, and a Superfund cleanup project was being planned for the creek. Independent news site Hell Gate subsequently reported that test boats had repeatedly run aground in Coney Island Creek and that sand had returned to the creek after it was partially dredged in 2021. Mayor Eric Adams announced in July 2022 that NYC Ferry would implement new fare rates that September, which would increase revenue by an estimated $2 million per year. Also in July 2022, the Rockaway Rocket route started operating during summer weekends. That September, city officials announced that further NYC Ferry expansions would be postponed until the system's finances stabilized. The city government agreed in August 2023 to pay Hornblower $405 million to continue operating NYC Ferry for five years. Residents of City Island, Bronx, and Canarsie, Brooklyn, also advocated for ferry stops in their respective neighborhoods, and there were also calls for a ferry line from Bay Ridge, Brooklyn, to Staten Island.

=== Mid-2020s to present ===
On February 21, 2024, Hornblower filed for Chapter 11 bankruptcy, also filing proceedings under the Companies' Creditors Arrangement Act of Canada shortly after. Hornblower was sold to Strategic Value Partners, a private equity firm, that day. The bankruptcy filing did not affect NYC Ferry service. The same year, NYC Ferry began looking to sell its naming rights. In July 2024, NYC Ferry announced that it would raise fares again; the fare increases took effect on September 9. The City Council introduced legislation that September, which would compel the NYCEDC to study the feasibility of further expanding the ferry system. By then, ridership on NYC Ferry had surpassed figures from before the COVID-19 pandemic. By November 2024, NYC Ferry's year-to-date ridership had reached 6.9 million, higher than any other year since the system launched. However, its ridership was still less than 1% of the subway system's annual ridership.

In mid-2025, City Council members Kamillah Hanks and Justin Brannan introduced legislation to permit the South Brooklyn ferry route to be extended from Bay Ridge to Staten Island. The NYCEDC announced that July that it was considering multiple changes to the NYC Ferry network. Among them, the Rockaway and Soundview routes would be merged; the East River route would become two skip-stop services; the South Brooklyn service would be extended north to 34th Street and would no longer serve Sunset Park or Bay Ridge; and the St. George route would be extended at its south end to serve Bay Ridge, Atlantic Avenue, and Wall Street. That August, the system recorded more than 1 million monthly riders for the first time ever. The EDC was again studying the feasibility of a Coney Island ferry service in late 2025. That November, the EDC finalized its route changes, with minor modifications, and announced plans for new ferry piers at East Harlem in Manhattan and Bush Terminal in Brooklyn; the changes, excluding the new piers, went into effect December 8. Following the January 23–27, 2026 North American winter storm, the entire NYC Ferry system experienced its first multi-week shutdown in its history.

== Fares ==
The fare for a single, one-way trip is $5. The fare was originally $2.75, the same as on other modes of transportation in New York City such as the subway. A $1 surcharge was originally required to bring a bike on the ferry. 30-day passes were available for $121, while a 30-day pass for cyclists cost $141. Riders can transfer to other ferry routes within the system for free for 120 minutes after the passenger boards the first ferry. The NYC Ferry system does not provide free transfer to the Metropolitan Transportation Authority's greater mass transit system, nor does it accept MetroCards nor OMNY. Ferry tickets can be purchased online, through NYC Ferry's mobile app, or physically at a ticket booth or ticket machine.

Starting September 12, 2022, the fare for a one-way trip increased to $4. The one-way fare for disabled passengers, low-income residents, and passengers over age 65 was reduced to $1.35. In addition, a 10-trip ticket was introduced, costing $27.50; this would effectively keep the price of a ferry fare at $2.75 for regular commuters. The $1 bicycle surcharge and 30-day passes were eliminated. In September 2024, fares were increased to $29 for a 10-trip ticket, $4.50 for a single-trip ticket, and $1.45 for a reduced-fare ticket.

In June 2023, NYC Ferry introduced summertime Rockaway Reserve tickets, where riders on the Rockaway route could pay $10 for a reserved seat on a specific Rockaway ferry trip up to two weeks in advance. Tickets for Rockaway Reserve seat reservations and Rockaway Rocket express ferries were increased to $12 for 2025. As part of a pilot program, in October 2025, NYC Ferry began selling 48-hour unlimited passes for $15. Effective October 19, 2026, NYC Ferry increased one-way fares to $5, expanding the discount ticket program to students in middle & high school on weekdays. The 10-trip ticket increased to $30.00 making the price of the ferry $3 a ride for regular customers.

== Routes ==
As of 2022, there are six routes and one seasonal route that make up the NYC Ferry system. There was a phased introduction of these routes. Phase 1 covered the routes implemented in 2017 and provided new service to the Rockaways, Bay Ridge, Sunset Park, Roosevelt Island, and Astoria in addition to areas already served by the East River Ferry. Phase 2 covered the routes implemented in 2018 and provided new service to Soundview, Yorkville, Kips Bay, and the Lower East Side. In 2019, the summer weekend extension of the East River and South Brooklyn lines to Governors Island was eliminated due to complaints about the confusing routing patterns, and replaced by a new Governors Island shuttle route. The Governor's Island route is seasonal and only operates during summer weekends; it launched in 2019. A route to St. George, Staten Island, started operating in 2021, and a route to Coney Island, Brooklyn, was planned. There are two main Manhattan terminals at Wall Street and East 34th Street. The Lower East Side route was discontinued in 2020, and the Coney Island route has been postponed indefinitely due to issues trying to find a suitable location for the landing in Coney Island.

Route	Start date	Terminals			Intermediate stops	Notes
Route	Start date	North	↔	South	Intermediate stops	Notes
East River Ferry	2011	Midtown-East 34th Street	↔	Pier 11/Wall Street	Hunter's Point South ("A" stops); Greenpoint (India Street) ("B" stops); North Williamsburg (North 6th Street) ("A" stops); South Williamsburg (Schaefer Landing) ("B" stops); Fulton–Dumbo ("A" and "B" stops)	On weekends from March to November, and weekday rush hours, some ferries make only stops marked "A", and other ferries make only stops marked "B".; On weekends from December to February, and off-peak weekdays, all East River ferries make all stops.
South Brooklyn Ferry	2017	Midtown-East 34th Street	↔	Governors Island (all except summer weekends); Bay Ridge (summer weekends only)	Corlear's Hook (Lower East Side); Fulton–Dumbo; Pier 11/Wall Street; Atlantic Avenue (Brooklyn Bridge Park Pier 6); Red Hook; Brooklyn Army Terminal (summer weekends only)	Serves Governors Island when the Governors Island shuttle is not running.; Select AM trips run express from Bay Ridge to Wall Street, stopping only at Atlantic Avenue.
Astoria Ferry	2017	East 90th Street	↔	Pier 11/Wall Street	Astoria; Roosevelt Island East; Long Island City North; Midtown-East 34th Street; Brooklyn Navy Yard	
Governors Island Ferry	2019	Pier 11/Wall Street	↔	Governors Island	No intermediate stops	Seasonal weekend service only
St. George Ferry	2021	West Midtown/Pier 79 at Hudson River Park	↔	Pier 11/Wall Street	Battery Park City Ferry Terminal; Empire Outlets; Bay Ridge	
Rockaway Rocket	2022	Long Island City North	↔	Rockaway (Beach 108th Street)	Greenpoint	Summer service only.; Requires a premium fare and reserved ticket.
Rockaway-Soundview Ferry	2025	Ferry Point Park	↔	Rockaway (Beach 108th Street)	Soundview; East 90th Street/Yorkville; Midtown-East 34th Street; Stuyvesant Town; Pier 11/Wall Street; Brooklyn Army Terminal	Prior to 2025, was composed of two separate routes: the Rockaway Ferry south of Pier 11/Wall Street, and the Soundview Ferry north of there.

The following services are discontinued or do not operate:

Route	Start date	End date	Terminals			Intermediate stops
Route	Start date	End date	North	↔	South	Intermediate stops
Lower East Side Ferry	2018	2020	Long Island City	↔	Pier 11/Wall Street	East 34th Street; Stuyvesant Town; Corlear's Hook (Lower East Side)
Coney Island Ferry	N/A	N/A	Coney Island	↔	Pier 11/Wall Street	Bay Ridge

In addition to ferry service, NYC Ferry operates shuttle buses to connect passengers with ferry landings:

Route	Start date	Terminals			Notes
Route	Start date	North	↔	South	Notes
Rockaway West Shuttle	2017	Rockaway Point Blvd/Beach 169th St	↔	Beach Channel Drive/Beach 108th St (Ferry Terminal)	Operates throughout the day.; The southbound terminal at Rockaway Point Blvd/Beach 169th St is only served on weekdays.
Rockaway East Shuttle	2017	Beach Channel Drive/Beach 108th St (Ferry Terminal)	↔	Beach Channel Drive/Beach 35th St	Operates throughout the day via Rockaway Beach Blvd.
Ferry Point Park Shuttle	2021	Ferry Point Park parking lot		Throggs Neck ferry terminal	Operates Monday – Friday from 5:00 AM – 10:00 AM and from 3:00 PM until the final NYC Ferry arrival/departure.

=== Astoria Ferry ===
Astoria ferries run in both directions with year-round service running every 38 minutes during rush hours and evenings, hourly during weekday middays, and on an irregular schedule at least once per hour on weekends.

The route began stopping at the Brooklyn Navy Yard/Pier 72 in May 2019, and was extended to end at East 90th St on August 22, 2020.

Stop	Transfers
East 90th St; Yorkville; 40.7773°N 73.9422°W	N, Q, and R trains at 96th Street; NYCT Bus: M31 and M86 SBS buses
Astoria; 3–10 Astoria Boulevard, Queens; 40.7717°N 73.9357°W	MTA and NYCT Bus: Q18, Q19, Q103, B62 buses
Roosevelt Island South; Under the Queensboro Bridge, East Channel; 40.7568°N 73.9525°W	Roosevelt Island Tramway; F and M trains at Roosevelt Island; MTA Bus: Q102 bus
Long Island City North; 47th Road, Gantry Plaza State Park, Queens; 40.7484°N 73.9577°W	7 and <7> trains at Vernon Boulevard–Jackson Avenue; NYCT Bus: B32, B62, B67 buses MTA Bus: Q101 and Q103 buses
East 34th Street Ferry Landing; FDR Drive/34th Street, Manhattan; 40.7439°N 73.9707°W	SeaStreak; 4, 6, and <6> trains at 33rd Street; NYCT Bus: M15, M15 SBS, M34 SBS, M34A SBS, M101, M102 and M103 buses MTA Bus: BM5, BxM1, QM12, QM15, QM16, QM17, QM18 and QM24 buses
Brooklyn Navy Yard; Dock 72, near 63 Flushing Avenue; 40.7018°N 73.9735°W	NYCT Bus: B57, B67 and B69 buses
Pier 11 at Wall Street; South Street at Gouverneur Lane; 40.7031°N 74.0061°W	SeaStreak; New York Beach Ferry; NYCT Bus: M15, M15 SBS and SIM5 buses MTA Bus: BM1, BM2, BM3, BM4, QM7, QM8, QM11, QM25, QM65 buses

=== East River Ferry ===
Station service legend
Stops weekdays during the day	Stops during weekday off-peak hours and December to February weekends
Stops weekends during the day	Stops during weekday rush hours and March to November weekends
Time period details

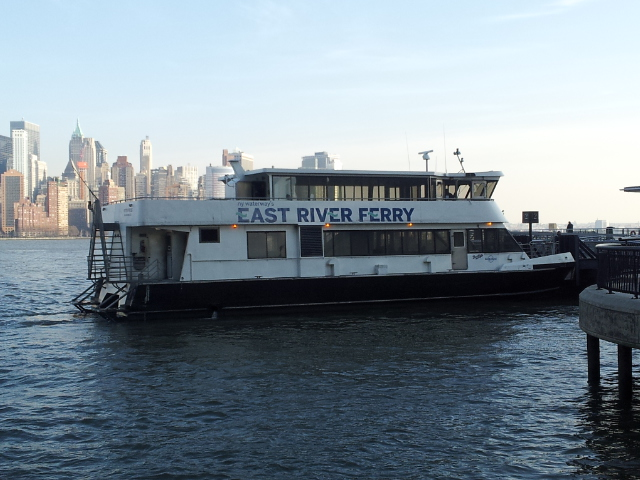
The East River Ferry in its former NY Waterway livery

East River ferries operate in both directions with year-round service, running every 22 minutes during rush hours, every 36 minutes during middays and evenings, and every 24 minutes on weekends. Starting on December 8, 2025, the route was split into two service patterns during weekday rush hours and weekends from March to November; it will continue to run as one route during weekday off-peak hours and weekends from December to February. The East River Ferry would also terminate at East 34th Street, with the Hunter's Point South stop as an intermediate stop.

A	B	LCL	Stop	Transfers
Stops weekends during the day	Stops weekends during the day	Stops weekdays during the day	East 34th Street Ferry Landing; FDR Drive/34th Street, Manhattan; 40.7439°N 73.9707°W	NY Waterway shuttle bus Seastreak; 4, 6, and <6> trains at 33rd Street; NYCT Bus: M15, M15 SBS, M34 SBS, M34A SBS, M101, M102 and M103 buses MTA Bus: BM5, BxM1, QM12, QM15, QM16, QM17, QM18 and QM24 buses
Stops weekends during the day	|	Stops weekdays during the day	Hunter's Point South; Center Boulevard & Borden Avenue, Queens; 40.7418°N 73.9613°W	7 and <7> trains at Vernon Boulevard–Jackson Avenue; Long Island City LIRR station NYCT Bus: B32, B62, Q67; MTA Bus: Q101 and Q103 buses
|	Stops weekends during the day	Stops weekdays during the day	Greenpoint; India Street, Brooklyn; 40.7314°N 73.9636°W	G train at Greenpoint Avenue; NYCT Bus: B24, B32, B43 and B62 buses
Stops weekends during the day	|	Stops weekdays during the day	North Williamsburg; North Sixth Street, Brooklyn; 40.7209°N 73.9649°W	L train at Bedford Avenue; NYCT Bus: B32, B62 and Q59 buses
|	Stops weekends during the day	Stops weekdays during the day	South Williamsburg; Schaefer Landing, Brooklyn; 40.7088°N 73.9702°W	J, M, and Z trains at Marcy Avenue; NYCT Bus: B32, B39, B44 (late nights only), B44 SBS, B46, B60, B62, B67, Q54 and Q59 buses
Stops weekends during the day	Stops weekends during the day	Stops weekdays during the day	Dumbo/Fulton Ferry; Fulton Street, Brooklyn; 40.7037°N 73.9957°W	New York Water Taxi; 2 and 3 trains at Clark Street; A and C trains at High Street; F and <F> trains at York Street; NYCT Bus: B25 bus
Stops weekends during the day	Stops weekends during the day	Stops weekdays during the day	Pier 11 at Wall Street; South Street, Manhattan; 40.7031°N 74.0061°W	Seastreak; New York Beach Ferry; NYCT Bus: M15, M15 SBS and SIM5 buses MTA Bus: QM7, QM8, QM65 buses

Stop	Transfers
Pier 11 at Wall Street; South Street at Gouverneur Lane; 40.7031°N 74.0061°W	Seastreak; New York Beach Ferry; NYCT Bus: M15, M15 SBS and SIM5 buses MTA Bus: BM1, BM2, BM3, BM4, QM7, QM8, QM11, QM25, QM65 buses
Sunset Park; Brooklyn Army Terminal, Brooklyn; 40.6463°N 74.0264°W	N, R, and W trains at 59th Street; NYCT Bus: B9, B11, B37 and B63 buses
Rockaway; Beach 108th Street, Queens; 40.5842°N 73.8316°W	Rockaway shuttle buses A and S trains at Beach 105th Street or at Rockaway Park-Beach 116th Street; MTA Bus: Q22, Q35, Q53 SBS and QM16 buses

=== South Brooklyn Ferry ===
South Brooklyn ferries run in both directions with year-round service running every 50–60 minutes weekdays, and every 40–60 minutes on weekends.

On May 19, 2020, this route was modified to replace the Lower East Side route when it was discontinued. The route north of Atlantic Av was changed, where it now serves Wall St/Pier 11 before DUMBO, and was extended to now end at Corlears Hook. In 2021, service to DUMBO, Sunset Park, and Bay Ridge was to be discontinued in conjunction with the opening of the Coney Island route. However, due to issues trying to find a suitable landing in Coney Island, the route was postponed indefinitely as well as the changes to the South Brooklyn route. It is unknown if the addition of the Industry City stop, will still occur. In March 2023, a special AM express variant was created, which runs from Bay Ridge to Wall Street, making only one stop at Atlantic Avenue to speed up commutes. Starting on December 8, 2025, the South Brooklyn Ferry was extended north to East 34th Street, no longer serving Sunset Park or Bay Ridge except during the summer.

Station service legend
Stops all times except late nights	Stops every day during daytime hours only
Stops weekdays during the day	Stops all times except nights and summer weekends
Stops weekends during the day	Stops during summer weekends
Time period details

Service	Stop	Transfers
Stops all times except late nights	East 34th Street Ferry Landing; FDR Drive/34th Street, Manhattan; 40.7439°N 73.9707°W	NY Waterway shuttle bus Seastreak; 4, 6, and <6> trains at 33rd Street; NYCT Bus: M15, M15 SBS, M34 SBS, M34A SBS, M101, M102 and M103 buses MTA Bus: BxM1, QM12, QM15, QM16, QM17, QM18 and QM24 buses
Stops all times except late nights	Corlear's Hook; FDR Drive at Grand Street; 40.7104°N 73.9792°W	NYCT Bus: M14A SBS, M21 and M22 buses
Stops all times except late nights	Pier 11 at Wall Street; South Street at Gouverneur Lane; 40.7031°N 74.0061°W	SeaStreak; New York Beach Ferry; NYCT Bus: M15, M15 SBS and SIM5 buses MTA Bus: BM1, BM2, BM3, BM4, QM7, QM8, QM11, QM25, QM65 buses
Stops all times except late nights	Brooklyn Bridge Park Pier 6 Atlantic Avenue, Brooklyn; 40.6923°N 74.0021°W	NYCT Bus: B57, B61 and B63 buses
Stops all times except late nights	Red Hook; Brooklyn; 40.681°N 74.0134°W	NYCT Bus: B57 and B61 buses
Stops weekdays during the day	Governors Island (all except summer weekends); 40.69107°N 74.012236°W	
Stops weekends during the day	Sunset Park; Brooklyn Army Terminal, Brooklyn; 40.6463°N 74.0264°W	N, R, and W trains at 59th Street; NYCT Bus: B9, B11, B37 and B63 buses
Stops weekends during the day	Bay Ridge; Bay Ridge Avenue, Brooklyn; 40.6398°N 74.0381°W	NYCT Bus: B9, B64, X27 and X37 buses

=== Rockaway–Soundview Ferry ===
Rockaway–Soundview ferries run in both directions with year-round service.

In May 2018, a special Rockaway Express service was implemented on the Rockaway Ferry, running express between Pier 11/Wall Street and Rockaway while skipping Sunset Park. This service did not return for the summer 2019 season. In July 2022, a new variation of the express service was introduced. (See Rockaway Rocket).

On May 19, 2020, Stuyvesant Cove (originally a part of the Lower East Side Line) was added on the Soundview Ferry between Wall Street and 34th Street. On December 28, 2021, the Soundview Ferry was extended from Soundview to Throggs Neck. Starting on December 8, 2025, the Rockaway and Soundview ferries were combined.

Stop	Transfers
Throggs Neck; Ferry Point Park; 40.8055°N 73.8373°W	NYCT Bus: Q44 bus MTA Bus: Q50 bus
Soundview and Clason Point; 2 Bronx River Parkway; 40.8042°N 73.8487°W	6 train at Morrison Avenue–Soundview; NYCT Bus: Bx27 and Bx39 buses
East 90th St; Yorkville; 40.7773°N 73.9422°W	N, Q, and R trains at 96th Street; NYCT Bus: M15, M15 SBS, M31 and M86 SBS buses
East 34th Street Ferry Landing; FDR Drive/34th Street, Manhattan; 40.7439°N 73.9707°W	NY Waterway shuttle bus Seastreak; 4, 6, and <6> trains at 33rd Street; NYCT Bus: M15, M15 SBS, M34 SBS, M34A SBS, M101, M102 and M103 buses MTA Bus: BxM1, QM12, QM15, QM16, QM17, QM18 and QM24 buses
Stuyvesant Cove; Stuyvesant Cove Park, 20th Street at Avenue C/FDR Drive; 40.732°N 73.9729°W	NYCT Bus: M9, M14D SBS, M23 SBS and M34A SBS buses
Pier 11 at Wall Street; South Street at Gouverneur Lane; 40.7031°N 74.0061°W	Seastreak; New York Beach Ferry; NYCT Bus: M15, M15 SBS and SIM5 buses MTA Bus: BM1, BM2, BM3, BM4, QM7, QM8, QM11, QM25, QM65 buses
Sunset Park; Brooklyn Army Terminal, Brooklyn; 40.6463°N 74.0264°W	N, R, and W trains at 59th Street; NYCT Bus: B9, B11, B37 and B63 buses
Rockaway; Beach 108th Street, Queens; 40.5842°N 73.8316°W	Rockaway shuttle buses A and S trains at Beach 105th Street or at Rockaway Park-Beach 116th Street; MTA Bus: Q22, Q35, Q53 SBS and QM16 buses

=== Governors Island Ferry ===
A shuttle from Pier 11/Wall Street to Governors Island runs every 30 minutes on summer weekends only.

Stop	Transfers
Pier 11 at Wall Street; South Street at Gouverneur Lane; 40.7031°N 74.0061°W	Seastreak; New York Beach Ferry; NYCT Bus: M15, M15 SBS and SIM5 buses MTA Bus: BM1, BM2, BM3, BM4, QM7, QM8, QM11, QM25, QM65 buses
Governors Island (summer weekends only); 40.69107°N 74.012236°W	

=== St. George Ferry ===
This route runs every 30 minutes during rush hours, every 45 minutes during midday, every 45 minutes weekend mornings, and every 30 minutes on weekend afternoons and evenings. This route is the first NYC Ferry route to not stop at Wall St/Pier 11. Starting on December 8, 2025, the St. George Ferry continues east of Empire Outlets, stopping at Bay Ridge, Pier 6, and Wall Street.

Stop	Transfers
West Midtown/Pier 79 at Hudson River Park; Hudson River Park, West 39th Street at 12th Avenue, Manhattan; 40.7604°N 74.0035°W	NY Waterway; NYCT Bus: M12, M42 and M50 buses
Battery Park City Ferry Terminal; Vesey Street, Manhattan; 40.7152°N 74.0174°W	NY Waterway; Liberty Water Taxi; NYCT Bus: M9 and M20 buses
Empire Outlets; 1 Bay Street, Staten Island; 40.6456°N 74.0749°W	Staten Island Ferry at St. George Terminal; Staten Island Railway at St. George Terminal; NYCT Bus: S40, S42, S44, S46, S48, S51, S52, S61, S62, S66, S74, S76, S78, S81, S84, S86, S90, S91, S92, S94, S96 and S98 buses
Bay Ridge; Bay Ridge Avenue, Brooklyn; 40.6398°N 74.0381°W	NYCT Bus: B9, B64, X27 and X37 buses
Pier 11 at Wall Street; South Street at Gouverneur Lane; 40.7031°N 74.0061°W	Seastreak; New York Beach Ferry; NYCT Bus: M15, M15 SBS and SIM5 buses MTA Bus: BM1, BM2, BM3, BM4, QM7, QM8, QM11, QM25, QM65 buses

=== Coney Island Ferry ===
Service on this route was scheduled to begin in 2021. The construction and placement on the Coney Island dock in Fraser Park was met with opposition due to concerns over environmental impact. The landing was completed in December 2022, with testing beginning that same month, but community opposition prompted NYC Ferry to stop test runs and remove the landing later that month. After weeks of unsuccessful attempts to find a new location for the landing, the route was postponed indefinitely.

Stop	Transfers
Pier 11 at Wall Street; South Street at Gouverneur Lane; 40.7031°N 74.0061°W	SeaStreak; New York Beach Ferry; NYCT Bus: M15, M15 SBS and SIM5 buses MTA Bus: BM1, BM2, BM3, BM4, QM7, QM8, QM11, QM25, QM65 buses
Bay Ridge; Bay Ridge Avenue, Brooklyn; 40.6398°N 74.0381°W	B9 and B64 buses
Coney Island; Final location to be determined	

=== Rockaway Rocket ===
The Rockaway Rocket express service was introduced in 2022 and runs during summer weekends and holidays. The Rockaway Rocket is a premium-fare service; a seat is reserved for every ticket holder. During mornings, the Rockaway Rocket runs directly from Pier 11 to Rockaway; during afternoons and evenings, the Rockaway Rocket runs from Rockaway to Pier 11.

Originally costing $8 per ticket, the Rockaway Rocket is a new variation of the Rockaway Express route, which last ran in 2019. Due to intense crowding, a special express version of the Rockaway route, named the Rockaway Rocket, supplements the regular Rockaway ferry by providing direct service to the Rockaways with reserved guaranteed seating and a higher price. In 2024, the Rockaway Rocket began running to Long Island City North and Greenpoint instead of from Pier 11. Fares were also raised to $10. Fares were again raised to $12 in 2025.

Stop	Transfers
Long Island City North; 47th Road, Gantry Plaza State Park, Queens; 40.7484°N 73.9577°W	7 and <7> trains at Vernon Boulevard–Jackson Avenue; Long Island City LIRR station NYCT Bus: B32, B62, Q67 buses MTA Bus: Q101 and Q103 buses
Greenpoint; India Street, Brooklyn; 40.7314°N 73.9636°W	G train at Greenpoint Avenue; NYCT Bus: B24, B32, B43 and B62 buses
Rockaway; Beach 108th Street, Queens; 40.5842°N 73.8316°W	Rockaway shuttle buses A and S trains at Beach 105th Street or at Rockaway Park-Beach 116th Street; MTA Bus: Q22, Q35, Q53 SBS and QM16 buses

=== Discontinued service ===
The Lower East Side route originally ran in both directions, with service on this route running every 25 minutes during rush hours, every 60 minutes during middays and evenings, and every hour and 30 minutes during off-peak hours. This route was permanently discontinued on May 18, 2020, due to low ridership, and was replaced by the Astoria, Soundview, and South Brooklyn lines.

Stop	Transfers
Long Island City North; 47th Road, Gantry Plaza State Park, Queens; 40.7484°N 73.9577°W	7 and <7> trains at Vernon Boulevard–Jackson Avenue; Long Island City LIRR station NYCT Bus: B32 and B62 buses (at 11th Street and Jackson Avenue); MTA Bus: Q67 and Q103 buses
East 34th Street Ferry Landing; FDR Drive/34th Street, Manhattan; 40.7439°N 73.9707°W	SeaStreak; 4, 6, and <6> trains at 33rd Street; NYCT Bus: M15, M15 SBS, M34 SBS, M34A SBS, M101, M102 and M103 buses MTA Bus: BM5, BxM1, QM12, QM15, QM16, QM17, QM18 and QM24 buses
Stuyvesant Town; Stuyvesant Cove Park, 20th Street at Avenue C/FDR Drive; 40.73193°N 73.97321°W	M9, M14D SBS, M23 SBS and M34A SBS buses
Corlear's Hook; FDR Drive at Grand Street; 40.7104°N 73.9792°W	NYCT Bus: M14A SBS, M21 and M22 buses
Pier 11 at Wall Street; South Street at Gouverneur Lane; 40.7031°N 74.0061°W	SeaStreak; New York Beach Ferry; NYCT Bus: M15, M15 SBS, SIM5, SIM5X, SIM15 and SIM35 buses MTA Bus: BM1, BM2, BM3, BM4, QM7, QM8, QM11 and QM25 buses

== Stops ==
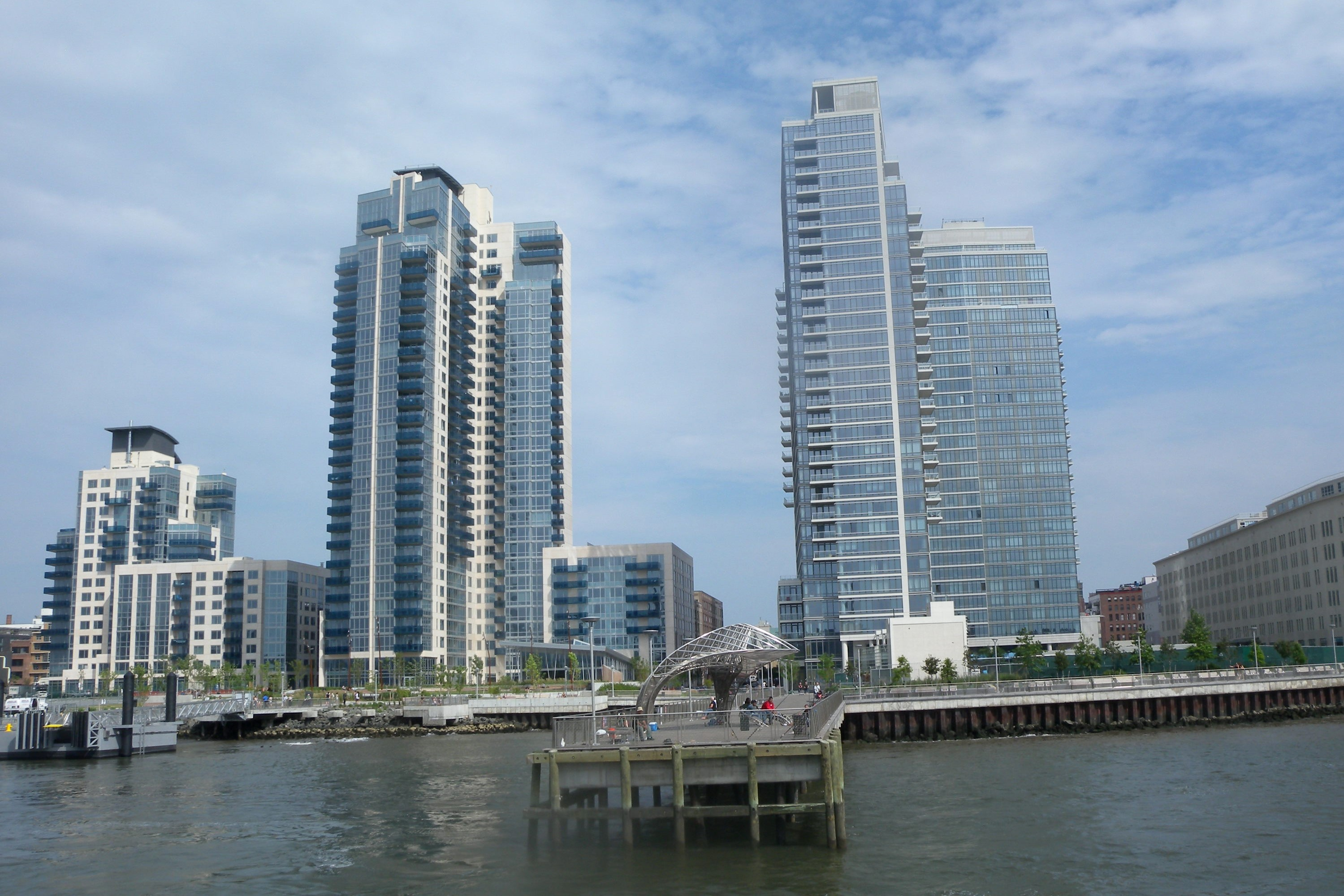
North Williamsburg ferry stop

The service has 25 landings, of which ten brand-new, five upgraded, and six pre-existing landings with no upgrades with the addition of NYC Ferry routes. The existing East River Ferry landings at Brooklyn Bridge Park Pier 1; Schaefer Landing, North Williamsburg, Greenpoint, and Long Island City remained unchanged. Upgrades were made to the landings at Wall Street, East 34th Street, East 92nd Street, the Brooklyn Army Terminal, and Brooklyn Bridge Park Pier 6. The remaining landings were built as part of the project. A stop on Governor's Island was implemented along one of the routes to South Brooklyn. At the present time, the Governor's Island Ferry, the only public access to the island, runs seasonally between May and September, but ferry service year-round has been proposed. It was decided to build the Rockaway dock at Beach 108th Street, but a proposed second dock could not be built further east than Beach 84th Street due to height restrictions caused by the Rockaway Line subway bridge. Construction on the first dock, the Rockaway landing, began in January 2017.

The upgraded landings, which increase capacity and passenger flow, are located on 35-by-90-foot (11 by 27 m) barges that connect to land via the use of either one or two articulated ramps. The landings conform to the Americans with Disabilities Act and contain enclosed waiting rooms with ticket booths and information boards. Mono-pile mooring facilities are installed on the side of the landings to ensure that the ferries dock safely, but some landings also include extra bulkheads or piers.

== Fleet ==
The original 86-foot (26 m) boats can carry 150 people each, including wheelchairs, strollers, and bicycles. Newer 97-foot (30 m) boats seat 350 passengers. As a further incentive the boats have snack and drinks available for purchase. There are also battery-charging stations on board the boats.

In July 2016, Metal Shark Boats and Horizon Shipbuilding were jointly awarded construction contracts for the service's new-build ferries. The vessels, which were designed by Incat Crowther, are about 86 feet (26 m) long, with a 26-foot (7.9 m) beam, and have a passenger capacity of 149. They are powered by Baudouin diesel engines, with a service speed of 25 knots (46 km/h; 29 mph). By September, nineteen ferries were being built for Phase 1 of service. In January 2017, five more ferries were ordered from Horizon Shipbuilding, for a total of 24 vessels. The first new-build vessel for NYC Ferry was launched by Horizon Shipbuilding on February 13, 2017. These boats arrived in New York City on April 17 and were named at a ceremony at Brooklyn Bridge Park.

The boats use the same types of loading equipment on the port and starboard Sides and bow as do boats that already operated in the New York Harbor. There are two types of boats: an open-water "Rockaway vessel" type for the Rockaway route, and another "River vessel" type for the rest of the system. Both designs have a common length and beam, but the Rockaway service vessels have a slightly deeper draft and higher freeboard, as well as added fuel capacity and larger engines giving a slightly higher service speed. All of the vessels are powered by engines that pass Environmental Protection Agency Tier 3 vehicle emission and fuel standards guidelines. Ferry horns' volumes were lowered in June 2017 after complaints by residents living near ferry stops.

The Brooklyn Army Terminal and Brooklyn Navy Yard were considered for the location of the vessel maintenance facility. The Navy Yard option, which the city preferred because of its proximity to the "core operating area" of the routes and would allow an extra station to be added there in the future, was eventually selected. Renovation of the site was required to remove an existing pier and replace it with a new structure capable of docking up to 25 boats. This new facility is responsible for performing regular cleaning and maintenance on the vessels. The construction work began in spring 2017 with completion in March 2019.

Originally three of the twenty 149-passenger vessels were to be reconfigured into 250-passenger boats. The plan was scrapped, as in September 2017, the NYCEDC ordered three new 350-passenger boats for NYC Ferry service to supplement the 20 original boats. Metal Shark built the new boats for $7 million to $7.5 million each. Three more large boats were ordered in November 2017. As part of the contract between the city and Hornblower, both parties have options for the city to buy the boats in the future. The first of the new 350-passenger boats was delivered in July 2018.

By early 2020, a total of 31 vessels were in active service. In April, the first two vessels powered by engines meeting EPA Tier 4 emissions standards were delivered, with five additional ferries under construction and scheduled to enter service by the end of the year. By this time, the construction program had expanded beyond Metal Shark to include other shipbuilders in both Louisiana and Florida.

Before being allowed to pilot a NYC Ferry vessel, prospective captains are tested using a ferry simulation at the State University of New York Maritime College in Throggs Neck. As of April 2017, there were plans to hire up to 50 captains by 2018. In July 2017, Hornblower started looking to hire 80 deckhands to dock boats.

=== Active roster ===
The following vessels are owned and operated by Hornblower for NYC Ferry operation, and do not include vessels leased from other companies.

Image	Vessel (Number)	Year	Notes
	Waves of Wonder (HB-101)	2016	1st Generation (T Class) Standard/River Type Vessel; Able to accommodate up-to 150 passengers; Contains displays and announcements for route stops/destinations; Features top deck accessible from rear of vessel, and plastic seats with tables.
	Sunset Crossing (HB-102)	2016	1st Generation (T Class) Standard/River Type Vessel; Able to accommodate up-to 150 passengers; Contains displays and announcements for route stops/destinations; Features top deck accessible from rear of vessel, and plastic seats with tables.
	Happy Hauler (HB-103)	2016	1st Generation (T Class) Standard/River Type Vessel; Able to accommodate up-to 150 passengers; Contains displays and announcements for route stops/destinations; Features top deck accessible from rear of vessel, and plastic seats with tables.
	Great Eagle (HB-104)	2016	1st Generation (T Class) Standard/River Type Vessel; Able to accommodate up-to 150 passengers; Contains displays and announcements for route stops/destinations; Features top deck accessible from rear of vessel, and plastic seats with tables.
	Owl's Head (HB-105)	2016	1st Generation (T Class) Standard/River Type Vessel; Able to accommodate up-to 150 passengers; Contains displays and announcements for route stops/destinations; Features top deck accessible from rear of vessel, and plastic seats with tables.
	Munsee (HB-106)	2016	1st Generation (T Class) Standard/River Type Vessel; Able to accommodate up-to 150 passengers; Contains displays and announcements for route stops/destinations; Features top deck accessible from rear of vessel, and plastic seats with tables.
	Lunchbox (H-200)	2016	1st Generation (T Class) Standard/River Type Vessel; Able to accommodate up-to 150 passengers; Contains displays and announcements for route stops/destinations; Features top deck accessible from rear of vessel, and plastic seats with tables.
	Urban Journey (H-201)	2016	1st Generation (T Class) Standard/River Type Vessel; Able to accommodate up-to 150 passengers; Contains displays and announcements for route stops/destinations; Features top deck accessible from rear of vessel, and plastic seats with tables.
	Friendship Express (H-202)	2016	1st Generation (T Class) Standard/River Type Vessel; Able to accommodate up-to 150 passengers; Contains displays and announcements for route stops/destinations; Features top deck accessible from rear of vessel, and plastic seats with tables.
	Connector (H-203)	2016–2017	1st Generation (T Class) Rockaway Type Vessel; Able to accommodate up-to 150 passengers; Contains displays and announcements for route stops/destinations; Features top deck accessible from rear of vessel, and plastic seats with tables.; Plans were made to convert these vessels to accommodate up to 250 passengers; Conversion was halted as funding would be in place to order additional vessels; Eventually will be operating on the South Brooklyn route, beginning in 2021
	Opportunity (H-204)	2016–2017	1st Generation (T Class) Rockaway Type Vessel; Able to accommodate up-to 150 passengers; Contains displays and announcements for route stops/destinations; Features top deck accessible from rear of vessel, and plastic seats with tables.; Plans were made to convert these vessels to accommodate up to 250 passengers; Conversion was halted as funding would be in place to order additional vessels; Eventually will be operating on the South Brooklyn route, beginning in 2021
	Flyer (H-205)	2016–2017	1st Generation (T Class) Rockaway Type Vessel; Able to accommodate up-to 150 passengers; Contains displays and announcements for route stops/destinations; Features top deck accessible from rear of vessel, and plastic seats with tables.; Plans were made to convert these vessels to accommodate up to 250 passengers; Conversion was halted as funding would be in place to order additional vessels; Eventually will be operating on the South Brooklyn route, beginning in 2021
	McShiny (H-206)	2017–2018	2nd Generation (T Class) Standard/River Type Vessel; Able to accommodate up-to 150 passengers; Features top deck accessible from rear of vessel, and plastic seats with tables.; HB-107 was the last and only standard boat to be delivered in 2018.
	Starlight (H-207)	2017–2018	2nd Generation (T Class) Standard/River Type Vessel; Able to accommodate up-to 150 passengers; Features top deck accessible from rear of vessel, and plastic seats with tables.; HB-107 was the last and only standard boat to be delivered in 2018.
	Spring Mallard (H-208)	2017–2018	2nd Generation (T Class) Standard/River Type Vessel; Able to accommodate up-to 150 passengers; Features top deck accessible from rear of vessel, and plastic seats with tables.; HB-107 was the last and only standard boat to be delivered in 2018.
	Atlantic Compass (H-209)	2017–2018	2nd Generation (T Class) Standard/River Type Vessel; Able to accommodate up-to 150 passengers; Features top deck accessible from rear of vessel, and plastic seats with tables.; HB-107 was the last and only standard boat to be delivered in 2018.
	Ferry Godmother (HB-107)	2017–2018	2nd Generation (T Class) Standard/River Type Vessel; Able to accommodate up-to 150 passengers; Features top deck accessible from rear of vessel, and plastic seats with tables.; HB-107 was the last and only standard boat to be delivered in 2018.
	Ocean Queen Rockstar (HB-108)	2018–2019	2nd Generation (K Class) Rockaway Type Vessel; Can accommodate up to 350 passengers; Features leather vinyl seating without tables; The top deck can be reached from either end of the vessel.
	Seas the Day (HB-109)	2018–2019	2nd Generation (K Class) Rockaway Type Vessel; Can accommodate up to 350 passengers; Features leather vinyl seating without tables; The top deck can be reached from either end of the vessel.
	Golden Narrows (HB-110)	2018–2019	2nd Generation (K Class) Rockaway Type Vessel; Can accommodate up to 350 passengers; Features leather vinyl seating without tables; The top deck can be reached from either end of the vessel.
	Rainbow Cruise (HB-111)	2018–2019	2nd Generation (K Class) Rockaway Type Vessel; Can accommodate up to 350 passengers; Features leather vinyl seating without tables; The top deck can be reached from either end of the vessel.
	Unity (HB-112)	2018–2019	2nd Generation (K Class) Rockaway Type Vessel; Can accommodate up to 350 passengers; Features leather vinyl seating without tables; The top deck can be reached from either end of the vessel.
	Traversity (HB-113)	2018–2019	2nd Generation (K Class) Rockaway Type Vessel; Can accommodate up to 350 passengers; Features leather vinyl seating without tables; The top deck can be reached from either end of the vessel.
	Jewel of the Harbor (HB-114)	2018–2019	2nd Generation (K Class) Rockaway Type Vessel; Can accommodate up to 350 passengers; Features leather vinyl seating without tables; The top deck can be reached from either end of the vessel.
	Koalafied Cruiser (H-214)	2018–2019	2nd Generation (K Class) Rockaway Type Vessel; Can accommodate up to 350 passengers; Features leather vinyl seating without tables; The top deck can be reached from either end of the vessel.
	Dream Boat (HB-115)	2018–2019	2nd Generation (K Class) Rockaway Type Vessel; Can accommodate up to 350 passengers; Features leather vinyl seating without tables; The top deck can be reached from either end of the vessel.
	Forget Me Knot (H-90)	2018–2019	2nd Generation (K Class) Rockaway Type Vessel; Can accommodate up to 350 passengers; Features leather vinyl seating without tables; The top deck can be reached from either end of the vessel.
	Signs to Liberty (H-215)	2018–2019	2nd Generation (K Class) Rockaway Type Vessel; Can accommodate up to 350 passengers; Features leather vinyl seating without tables; The top deck can be reached from either end of the vessel.
	River Sprinter (HB-119)	2019–2020	3rd Generation (T Class) Standard/River Type Vessel; Able to accommodate up-to 150 passengers; Features top deck accessible from rear of vessel, and plastic seats with tables.; HB123 is the last vessel delivered as part of the contract.
	Bay Hopper (HB-120)	2019–2020	3rd Generation (T Class) Standard/River Type Vessel; Able to accommodate up-to 150 passengers; Features top deck accessible from rear of vessel, and plastic seats with tables.; HB123 is the last vessel delivered as part of the contract.
	Cyclone Shark (HB-121)	2019–2020	3rd Generation (T Class) Standard/River Type Vessel; Able to accommodate up-to 150 passengers; Features top deck accessible from rear of vessel, and plastic seats with tables.; HB123 is the last vessel delivered as part of the contract.
	White Sands (H-501)	2019–2020	3rd Generation (T Class) Standard/River Type Vessel; Able to accommodate up-to 150 passengers; Features top deck accessible from rear of vessel, and plastic seats with tables.; HB123 is the last vessel delivered as part of the contract.
	Tooth Ferry (HB-122)	2019–2020	3rd Generation (T Class) Standard/River Type Vessel; Able to accommodate up-to 150 passengers; Features top deck accessible from rear of vessel, and plastic seats with tables.; HB123 is the last vessel delivered as part of the contract.
	Time Traveler (HB-123)	2019–2020	3rd Generation (T Class) Standard/River Type Vessel; Able to accommodate up-to 150 passengers; Features top deck accessible from rear of vessel, and plastic seats with tables.; HB123 is the last vessel delivered as part of the contract.
	Melting Pot (H-91)	2020	3rd Generation (K Class) Rockaway Type Vessel; Can accommodate up to 350 passengers; Features leather vinyl seating without tables; The top deck can be reached from either end of the vessel.
	Purpose (H-401)	2020	3rd Generation (K Class) Rockaway Type Vessel; Can accommodate up to 350 passengers; Features leather vinyl seating without tables; The top deck can be reached from either end of the vessel.
	Curiosity (H-301)	2020	3rd Generation (K Class) Rockaway Type Vessel; Can accommodate up to 350 passengers; Features leather vinyl seating without tables; The top deck can be reached from either end of the vessel.
	City Fishy (H-92)	2020	3rd Generation (K Class) Rockaway Type Vessel; Can accommodate up to 350 passengers; Features leather vinyl seating without tables; The top deck can be reached from either end of the vessel.

== Schedules and shuttle buses ==
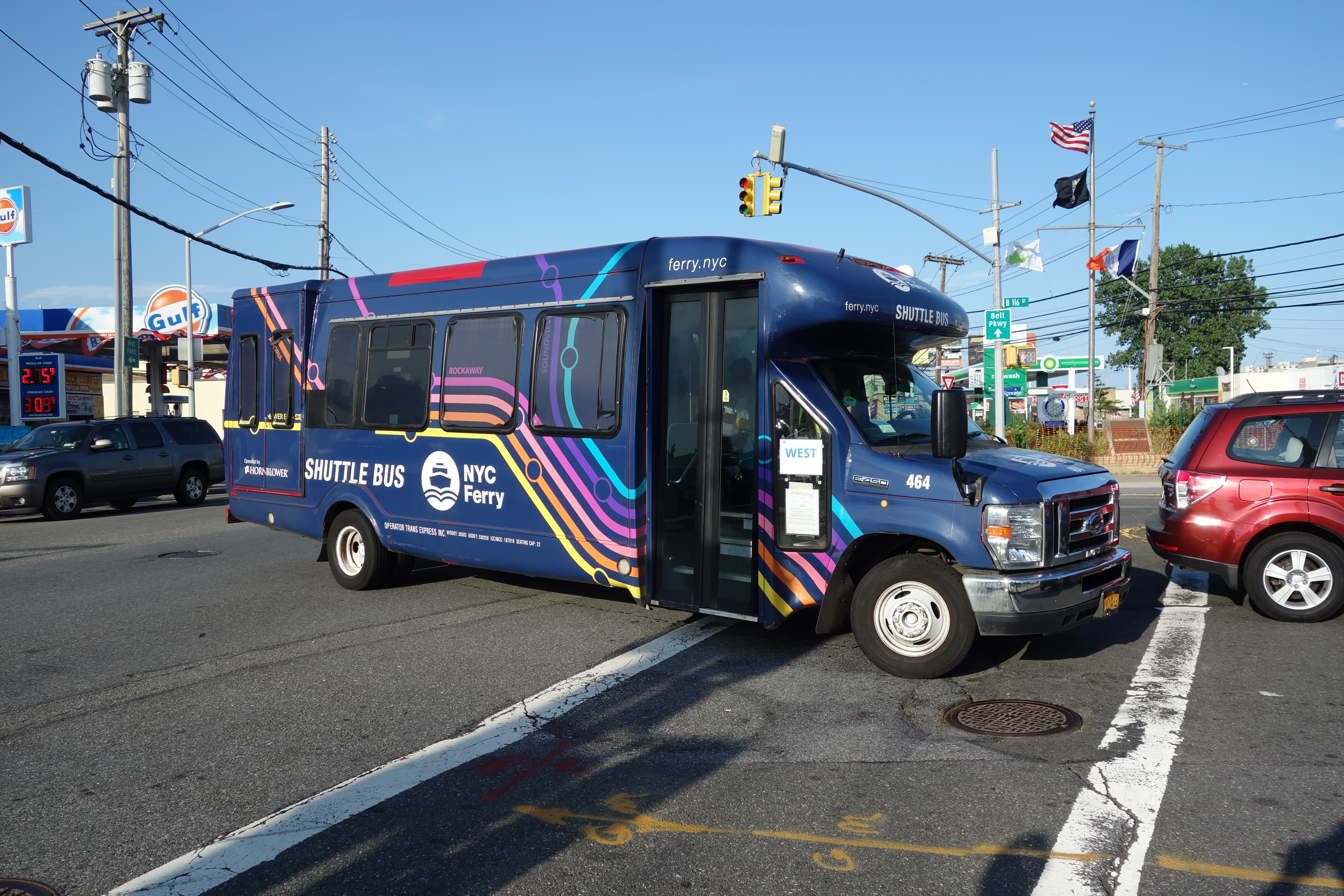
NYC Ferry shuttle bus in the Rockaways

NYC Ferry operates from 5:30 a.m. to 10:30 p.m. during all seven days of the week. During peak hours, ferries operate or are proposed to operate at 20-minute headways to Astoria and the Lower East Side; 30-minute headways to Bay Ridge and Soundview; and 30–60 minute headways to the Rockaways (see § Routes for more details).

NYC Ferry operates three shuttle bus routes. Two routes provide service to the Rockaway landing, which is at Beach 108th Street. One route goes west to Jacob Riis Park, while a second was originally planned for operation between the ferry landing and Beach 67th Street, but was ultimately extended eastward. The Environmental Impact Statement provided for an extension of the Beach 67th Street bus to Beach 31st Street via Rockaway Beach Boulevard and Beach Channel Drive, but de Blasio's office said that extending the bus further would cause a bus fleet shortage, resulting in passengers missing their boats. In May 2019, as part of a three-month pilot program, a nonstop shuttle bus route was created between the Rockaway landing and Far Rockaway–Mott Avenue station. The third route travels between the Throggs Neck dock and the Ferry Point Park parking lot. Another route previously provided shuttle bus service to the East 34th Street landing and was taken over from a preexisting NY Waterway route, but was discontinued in April 2024 due to low ridership.

== Impact ==
=== Reception ===
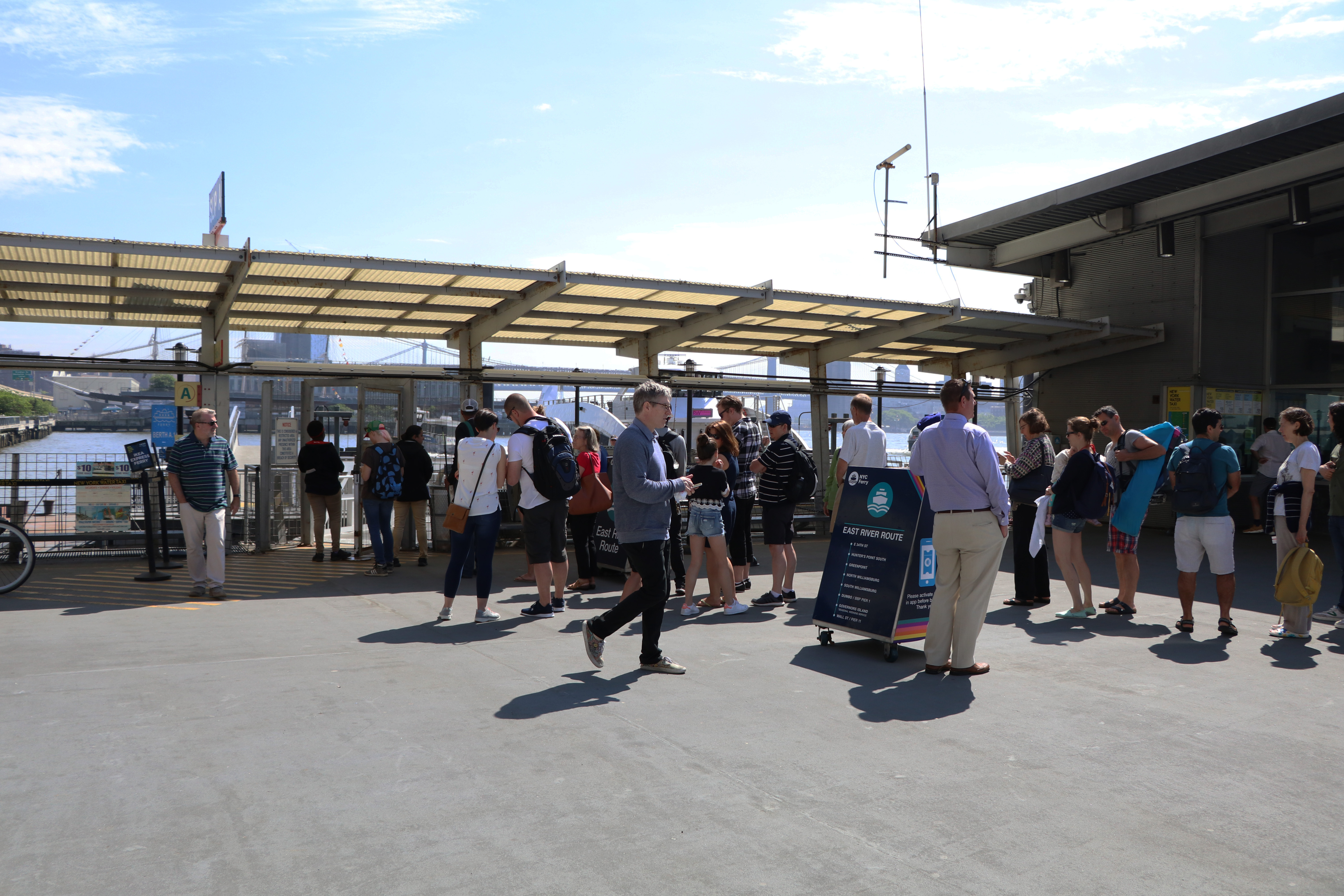
NYC Ferry stop at Pier 11

There has been both praise and criticism for the ferry service. The editorial board in the local newspaper amNewYork praised the NYC Ferry system's affordability and stated that if done correctly, the ferry "could be far more enjoyable than a subway ride". Politicians such as City Councilman Vincent Gentile and State Senator Marty Golden also lauded the fact that the ferry would bring service to places, such as southwest Brooklyn, that are underserved by transportation. Conversely, the ferry system has been criticized for mainly benefiting the well-off and for serving gentrifying waterfront areas such as Williamsburg. Most of the ferry stops were placed in areas where the annual income is higher than the city average. When the system opened, it did not serve Staten Island, and one writer for the Staten Island Advance noted that the then-planned Stapleton route was not only unfunded but also redundant to the existing Staten Island Ferry.

In July 2017, after the ferry had opened, a commentator for the news website CityLab called the NYC Ferry system's "customer-oriented amenities" a "key to transit's future." The writer noted that some of the high-quality amenities included snacks and drinks, an advanced ticketing system, connections to shuttle buses at certain terminals, and ferry workers who provided customer service—in contrast to the Metropolitan Transportation Authority, which she said "blames riders for its staggering decline in reliability" over the previous year. A reporter for Curbed NY wrote in September 2017 that the East River route was "worth the $2.75 fare, especially if you're a person who loves architecture", owing to its waterfront views of landmarks along the river.

After NYCEDC president James Patchett touted the ferry as a substitute to the subway system, Henry Grabar of Slate's Moneybox said that each ferry fits fewer people than a single subway car. Grabar also stated that "the commute will be a real delight" for the few who found the ferry convenient enough. Benjamin Kabak, a transit blogger, wrote that "the reach of the ferries is particularly narrow", out of walking distance for 94% of city residents. He also noted that the total ridership for NYC Ferry in 2017 was less than the New York City Subway's total daily ridership, and that more than three times as many people rode Citi Bike, the city's bike-share system, than took the ferry in 2017. The New York Post editorial board wrote in June 2020, "Mayor Bill de Blasio's favorite white elephant had turned into a real drag on the city" even before the COVID-19 pandemic, with the NYCEDC recording its first negative profits in 2019.

Tom Fox, the president of New York Water Taxi from 2001 to 2011, wrote in 2016 that the plan was marred with "an unrealistic time frame, the wrong lead agency, the selection of an inexperienced operator with no ferries, and poor planning". Fox cited the selection of Hornblower Cruises, a California-based cruise operator, despite a bid from three large ferry operators in the New York metropolitan area; the decision to build new boats for the system, instead of buying existing boats from other companies; and the fact that the new boats could accommodate fewer people than the overcrowded existing East River ferries. He noted that the city bought French motorboat engines that had never been used on passenger boats in the United States; and that since all American shipyards with expertise were not able to take new orders until 2018, the city decided to use a builder with less experience. Additionally, a reporter for DNAinfo.com wrote that Hornblower Cruises had a history of poor relations with its workers' unions. Another writer for that website stated that Hornblower had hired ticket sellers who harangued passersby in order to sell tickets for separate ferries in Lower Manhattan. The aggressive ticket-selling practice was stopped following the latter story.

=== Rider satisfaction ===
According to an August 2017 customer satisfaction survey from the NYCEDC, passengers had a mostly positive view of the NYC Ferry system, with 93% of riders giving positive ratings. Almost 70% of the 1,300 riders surveyed gave the ferry the highest possible rating. In May 2018, The Village Voice conducted an informal demographic survey of NYC Ferry riders, since the NYCEDC had not officially released the rider-demographic data. The Voice found that most of the 60 riders it encountered were using the ferry simply because it was less crowded and more comfortable compared to the subway. Additionally, many of the surveyed riders worked in higher-income jobs.

=== Influence on development ===
When the system opened, Henry Grabar wrote that the ferry system was a way to spur economic development along the waterfront, not a way to provide better access to transit deserts. In the eight years following the system's opening, there were high amounts of development in neighborhoods near ferry stops, such as Greenpoint, Williamsburg, Astoria, and the Rockaways. Among the largest such developments was the Domino Sugar Refinery site, located near the South Williamsburg stop.

=== Other ferries ===
Several ferries in the New York City area were affected when plans for NYC Ferry were made public. NY Waterway would give over its East River route to NYC Ferry. New York Water Taxi remained separate, but was to eliminate 200 jobs; it had stated that if it did not win the contract with the city to operate NYC Ferry, then it would shut down. Since the company did not win the NYC Ferry contract, it had been expected to shut down in October 2016, but continued operations through the end of the year before being purchased by Circle Line Sightseeing Cruises in January 2017. The city-owned Staten Island Ferry remains a separate entity. In addition, the ferry service would add 155 jobs to the New York Harbor area.
