= Vernon Boulevard–Jackson Avenue station =

New York City Subway station in Queens

Vernon Blvd–Jackson Avenue
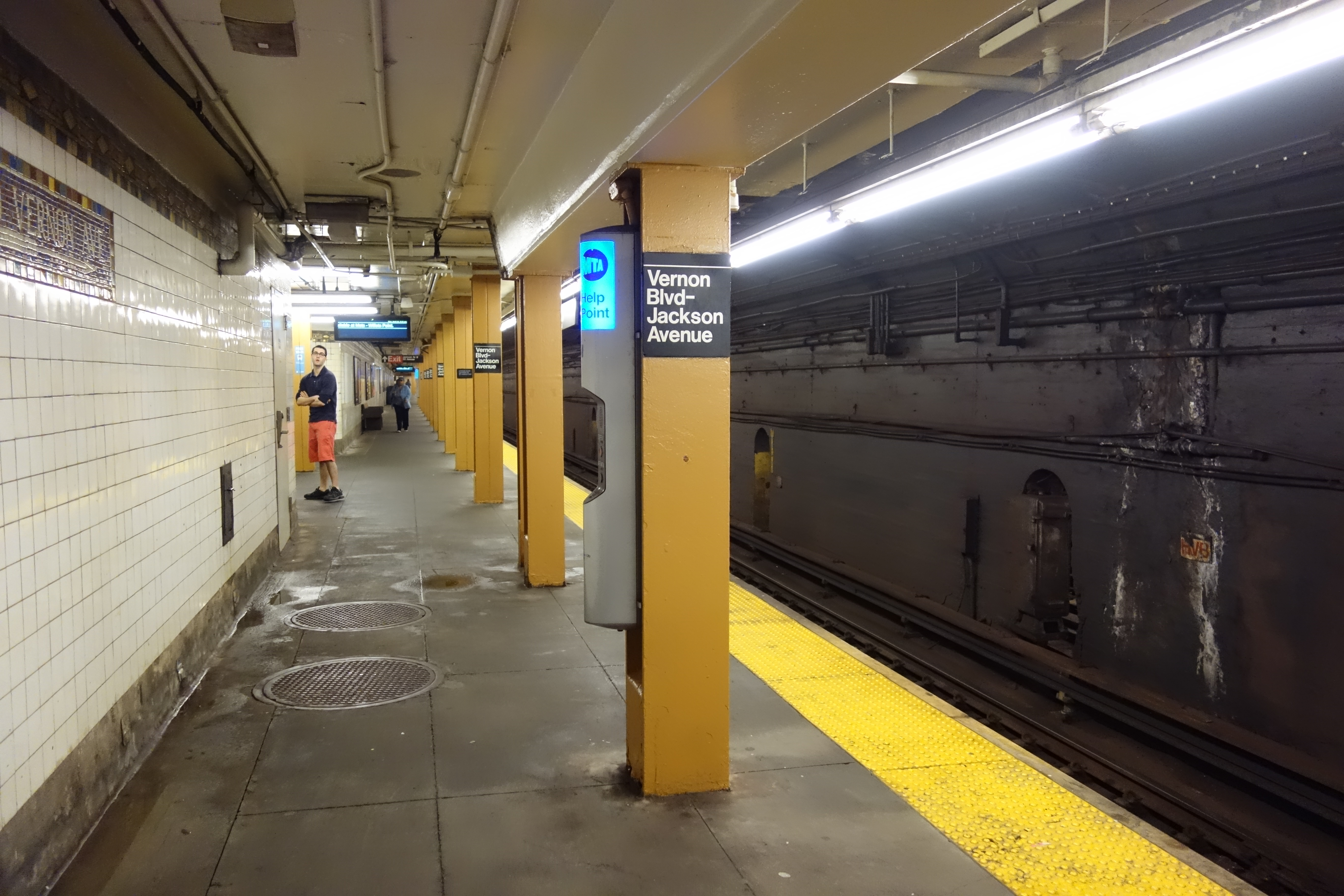
- Manhattan bound platform

Station statistics
- Address: 50th Avenue between Vernon Boulevard & Jackson Avenue; Queens, New York
- Borough: Queens
- Locale: Hunters Point, Long Island City
- Coordinates: 40.74264°N 73.95391°W
- Division: A (IRT)
- Line: IRT Flushing Line
- Services: 7 (all times) <7> (rush hours until 9:30 p.m., peak direction)
- Transit: NYCT Bus: B32, B62, Q67 (at 11th St & Jackson Av); MTA Bus: Q101, Q103; LIRR Long Island City station; NYC Ferry: East River (at Hunter's Point South)
- Structure: Underground
- Platforms: 2 side platforms
- Tracks: 2

Other information
- Opened: June 22, 1915; 111 years ago
- Accessible: No; planned
- Former/other names: Vernon–Jackson Avenues

Traffic
- 2025: 4,267,158 ▲11.2%
- Rank: 78 out of 423
Services
Preceding station	New York City Subway	Following station
Grand Central–42nd Street 7 <7> toward 34th Street–Hudson Yards	7 (New York City Subway service)	Hunters Point Avenue 7 <7> toward Flushing–Main Street
Location
Location within New York City Subway
Location within New York City
Location within New York
Track layout
Street map
Station service legend
Symbol	Description
Stops all times	Stops all times
Stops rush hours in the peak direction only	Stops rush hours in the peak direction only

The Vernon Boulevard–Jackson Avenue station (often informally referred to as Vernon–Jackson station; formerly Vernon–Jackson Avenues station) is a station on the IRT Flushing Line of the New York City Subway, and the westernmost station on the Queens portion of the line. It is served by the 7 train at all times and the <7> train during rush hours in the peak direction.

Although there is a nearby intersection of Vernon Boulevard and Jackson Avenue, the station is located one block north of that intersection, on 50th Avenue, between Vernon Boulevard and Jackson Avenue, both of which have entrances to the station.

== History ==
The Dual Contracts were formalized in early 1913, specifying new lines or expansions to be built by the Interborough Rapid Transit Company (IRT) and the Brooklyn Rapid Transit Company (BRT). The Dual Contracts involved opening the Steinway Tunnel as part of the new Flushing subway line. The route was to go from Times Square in Manhattan, passing through the tunnel to Long Island City in Queens, then continuing toward Flushing from there. The tunnel, with trolley loops on both the Manhattan and Queens sides, had sat unused since 1907, when test runs had been performed in the then-nearly-complete tunnel. The Queens trolley loop was near Vernon Avenue (now Vernon Boulevard) in Long Island City.

The Vernon–Jackson Avenues station opened on June 22, 1915, as a terminal for shuttle trains going into Manhattan via the Steinway Tunnel until the line was extended to Hunters Point Avenue on February 5, 1916. A westerly extension of the Manhattan-bound platform opened for service on December 20, 1923.

The city government took over the IRT's operations on June 12, 1940. The IRT routes were given numbered designations in 1948 with the introduction of "R-type" rolling stock, which contained rollsigns with numbered designations for each service. The route from Times Square to Flushing became known as the 7. In 1949, the New York City Board of Transportation announced that the Flushing Line platforms would be lengthened to 11 IRT car lengths; the platforms were only able to fit nine 51-foot-long IRT cars beforehand. The platforms at the station were extended in 1955–1956 to accommodate 11-car trains. However, nine-car trains continued to run on the 7 route until 1962, when they were extended to ten cars.

In 1981, the MTA listed the station among the 69 most deteriorated stations in the subway system.

=== 1997 station agent murder ===
In 1997, this station was the site of a night station agent being killed for subway tokens. The result of this incident was a change in policy where night station agents do not have to empty the turnstiles after the evening station agent leaves unless police, a supervisor, or another employee is present (and that is left to the option of the station agent). Since the introduction of the MetroCard, this process remains the same. Two armed NYCT guards clear the vending machines.

== Station layout ==
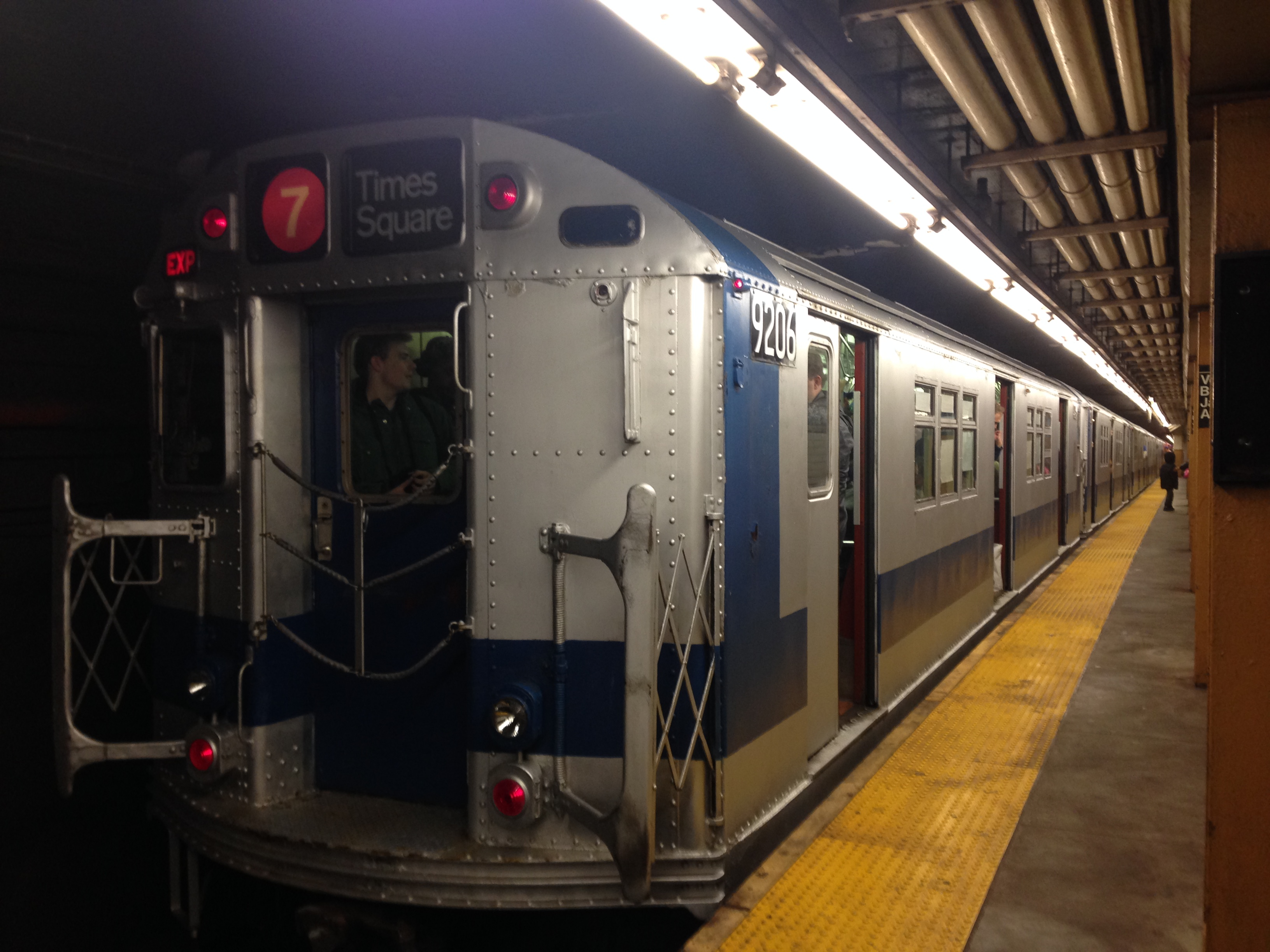
The Train of Many Colors at Vernon Boulevard-Jackson Avenue in 2016.

This underground station has two side platforms and two tracks. A black wall separates the two tracks for most of the station.

Both platforms have a line of yellow columns along their edges. Most of these are normal I-beam columns, but in the middle of the platforms, cream colored arches, which is also the color of the station's ceiling, starting at about four feet off the ground support a short section of the columns. The platform walls have a mosaic gold and brown trim line on top while the name tablets are mosaic white with white text reading "Vernon-Jackson Ave's" (erroneous if the use is considered in the possessive context, but it can also be considered as a contractional form of the plural) on a brown background and gold and brown border. There are also a few directional signs to the station's fare control areas reading "Vernon Ave" or "Jackson Ave" with an arrow beneath.

=== Exits ===
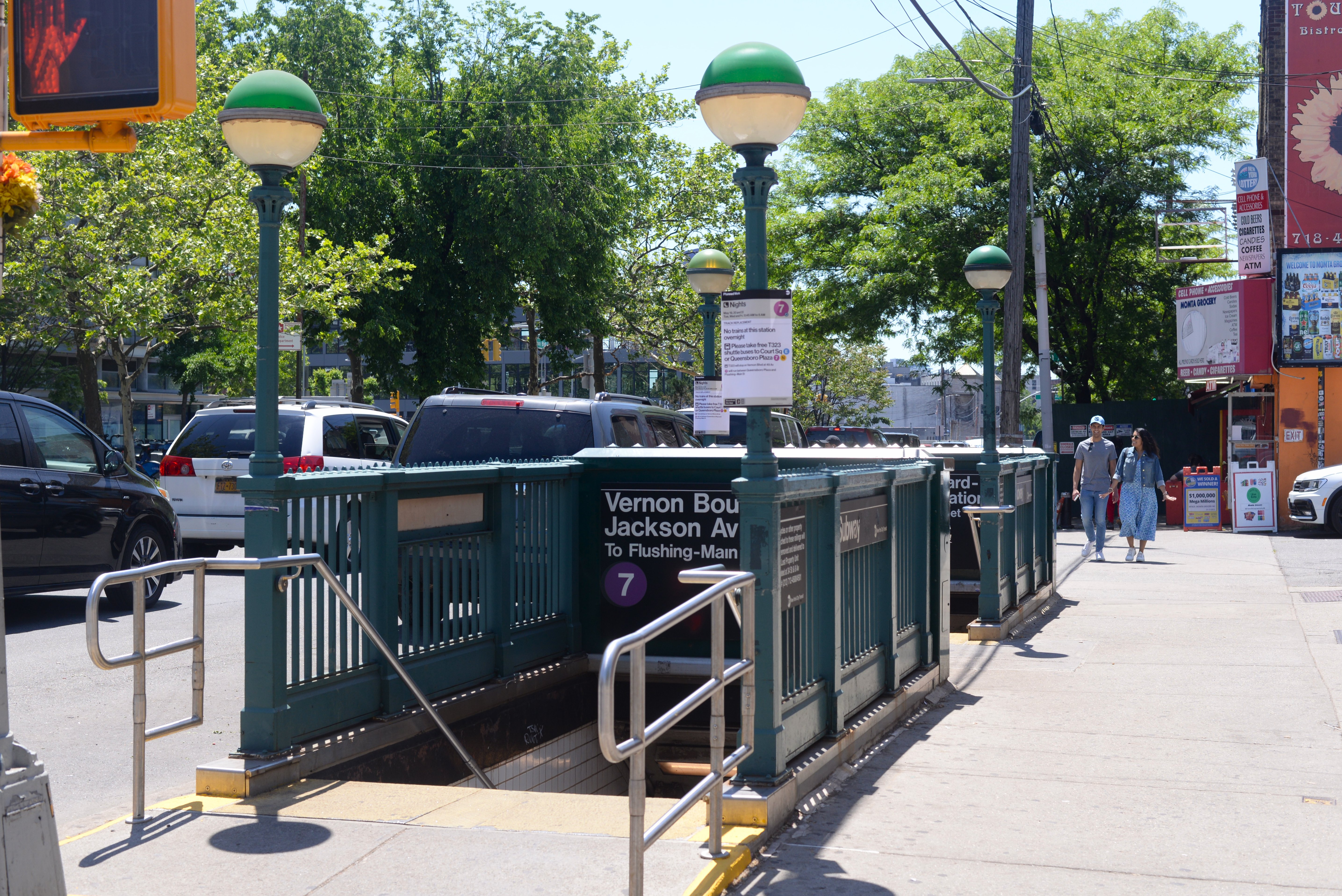
Street stair

Each platform has two same-level fare control areas and there are no crossovers or crossunders connecting the platforms. The full-time fare control areas are just west of the middle of the platforms, though only the Manhattan-bound platform still has a token booth. Each area has a small regular turnstile bank and two staircases to the street, the northeast corner of Vernon Boulevard and 50th Avenue for the Manhattan-bound platform and the southwest corner for the Flushing-bound platform. The southern staircase's steel fencing does not have the standard black sign saying what station this is and what trains serve it.

Each platform also has a larger, unstaffed fare control on their extreme east (railroad north) ends. On the Manhattan-bound platform, a wide, but short staircase goes up to some High Entry/Exit Turnstiles that lead to two street stairs, one to each northern corners of 50th Avenue and Jackson Avenue. This entrance at one time had a part-time token booth and regular turnstiles. The Flushing-bound platform has a similar arrangement with short staircase to a wide intermediate landing with a full-height turnstile at each corner. Outside the turnstiles is a single street stair, each going up to each southern corners of 50th Avenue and Jackson Avenue.
