= American Princess Cruises =

Ferries of New Jersey

American Princess Cruises, based in Neponsit, Queens, United States under the TWFM Ferry Service, Inc., offers ferry, sightseeing, and yacht charter excursions in Long Island, New Jersey, and New York City. It is one of several private ferry operators in the Port of New York and New Jersey.

== Fleet ==
American Princess Cruises' fleet consists of one monohull boat, the American Princess. The 95-foot (29 m) American Princess built in 1988 by Breaux Brothers Enterprises can carry up to 250 passengers. The American princess Boats moors at Riis Landing in Roxbury.

== Rockaway/Riis Landing ==
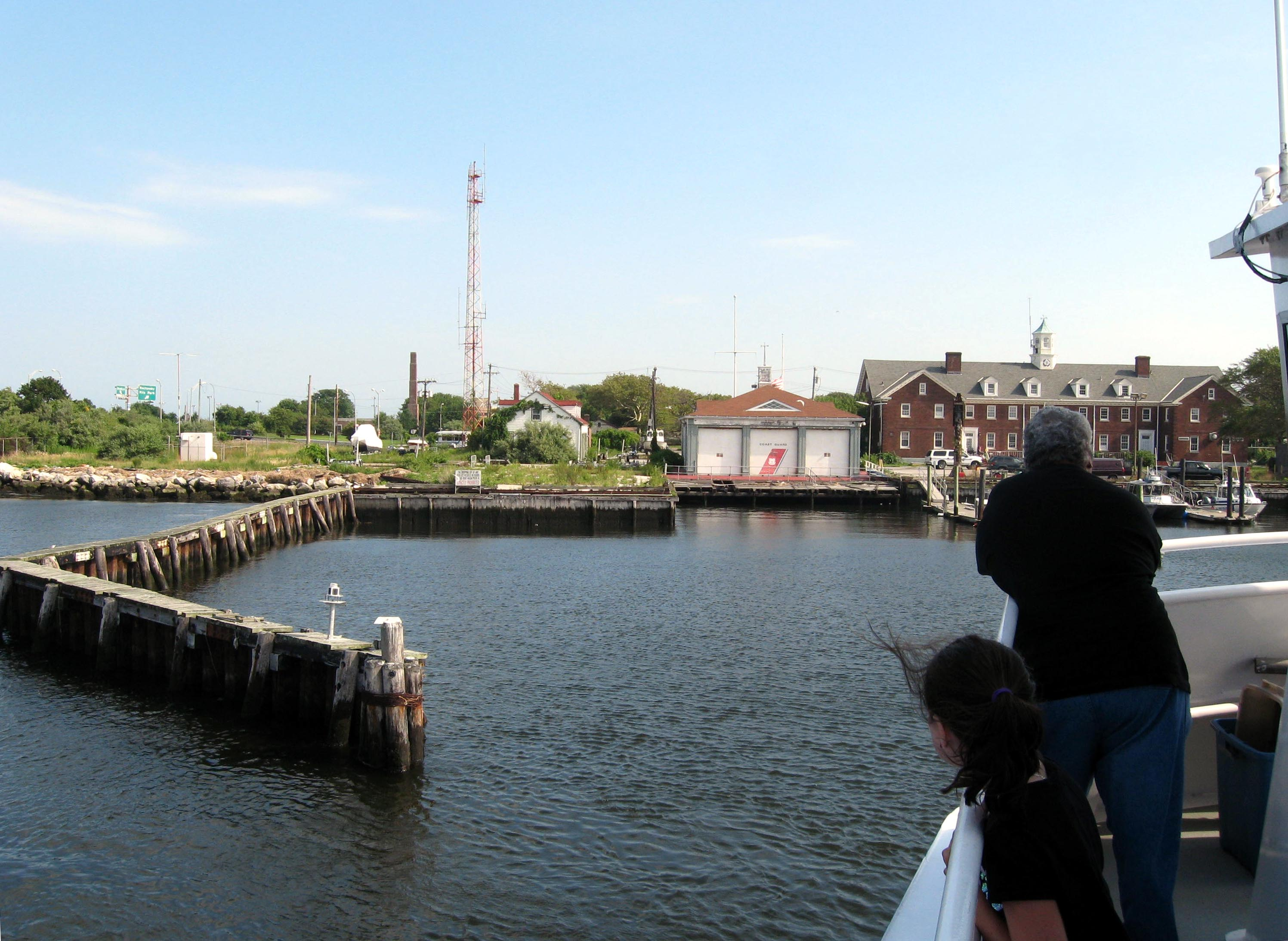
Riis Landing

=== New York Beach Ferry ===
American Princess Cruises' New York Beach Ferry brand operates New York Water Taxi's ferries to Gateway National Recreation Area beaches on the Rockaway Peninsula on Fridays, weekends, and holidays during the summer. Boats travel between Pier 11/Wall Street in Manhattan and Riis Landing near Fort Tilden.

=== Rockaway commuter service ===
New York Beach Ferry operated a commuter ferry under the New York Water Taxi brand between Wall Street at the Financial District in Manhattan and Riis Landing in Roxbury, Queens on summer Fridays, weekends, and holidays. The ferry also served the Brooklyn Army Terminal, East 34th Street Ferry Landing, and Sandy Hook Bay Marina on Fridays. The ferry, which used leisure boats American Princess and American Princess II made its maiden voyage on May 12, 2008, and was set to make its final voyage on March 19, 2010 due to low ridership (an average of 160 commuters used the ferry on weekdays). However, due to the action of City Councilman Eric Ulrich, as well as the Mayor's Office, Christine Quinn, and other members of the City Council in response to outrage by riders, the ferry was temporarily saved and funding continued until June 30, 2010. The $6 fare only recovered about thirty percent of the ferry's operating cost, with an average subsidy of $25 per passenger from the City. The ferry's daily rush hour service was indefinitely suspended on July 1, 2010.

In response to transit complications caused by Superstorm Sandy in October 2012, ferry service was revived, though the concession was given to SeaStreak. The route became NYC Ferry's Rockaway ferry route on May 1, 2017.

== Wild Life Tours ==
=== Whale and Dolphin Watching ===
From late April through mid November, the American Princess departs on Whale and Dolphin Watching tours out of Riis Landing. There's 1 trip per weekday on Wednesday, Thursday and Friday departing at 12pm returning approximately 4pm. These weekday tours run through early September.

The weekend trips on Saturday and Sunday depart at 1pm and return approximately 5pm. In early September these trips depart and 12pm and return at 4pm.

Whales seen on these trips and predominantly humpback whales with Minke, North Atlantic Right Whales and Fin Whales occasionally seen. Dolphins are predominantly Atlantic Bottlenose Dolphins with Common dolphins occasionally seen.

The American Princess is the only whale watching vessel in New York to be certified by WHALE SENSE a division of NOAA that regularly tests and certifies boats and crews in safe whale watching practices.

==== Seal Watching ====
From mid March to late April, the American Princess departs on seal watching cruises to Swinburne and Hoffman Islands, just south of the Verrazano Narrows Bridge
