= List of NYC Ferry stops =

The following is a list of stops on NYC Ferry as of December 2025.

== Stops ==
NYC Ferry stops as of 2026
Name	Routes	Borough	Start of service
Astoria	Astoria	Queens	2017
Atlantic Avenue/BBP Pier 6	South Brooklyn; St. George	Brooklyn	2017
Battery Park City	St. George	Manhattan	2021
Bay Ridge	South Brooklyn; St. George	Brooklyn	2017
Brooklyn Navy Yard	Astoria	Brooklyn	2019
Corlears Hook	South Brooklyn	Manhattan	2018
DUMBO/Fulton Ferry	East River	Brooklyn	2017
East 34th Street	Astoria; East River; Rockaway; South Brooklyn	Manhattan	2017
East 90th Street	Astoria; Rockaway	Manhattan	2018
Governors Island	Governors Island; South Brooklyn	Manhattan	2017
Greenpoint	East River	Brooklyn	2017
Hunters Point South	East River	Queens	2017
Long Island City	Astoria	Queens	2017
Midtown West	St. George	Manhattan	2021
North Williamsburg	East River	Brooklyn	2017
Red Hook	South Brooklyn	Brooklyn	2017
Rockaway	Rockaway	Queens	2017
Roosevelt Island	Astoria	Manhattan	2017
Soundview	Rockaway	The Bronx	2018
South Williamsburg	East River	Brooklyn	2017
St. George	St. George	Staten Island	2021
Stuyvesant Cove	Rockaway	Manhattan	2018
Sunset Park/BAT	Rockaway; South Brooklyn	Brooklyn	2017
Throgs Neck	Rockaway	The Bronx	2021
Wall Street/Pier 11	Astoria; East River; Governors Island; Rockaway; South Brooklyn; St. George	Manhattan	2017

=== The Bronx ===
==== Soundview ====
Soundview

General information
- Location: Near Clason Point Park, The Bronx
- Coordinates: 40.8049482°N 73.8487173°W
- System: Ferry terminal
- Connections: New York City Subway: at Morrison Avenue-Soundview; NYCT Bus: Bx27, Bx39

Services
Preceding station	NYC Ferry	Following station
Throgs Neck/Ferry Point Park Terminus	Rockaway-Soundview	East 90th Street toward Rockaway
Location

Located at the south east end of Clason Point Park, it opened as part of the Soundview line in August 2018. It was the northern terminal of the Soundview Line until the opening of Throgs Neck/Ferry Point Park. The Bx27 bus stops near the street loop on the north side of the street.

==== Throgs Neck/Ferry Point Park ====
Throgs Neck/Ferry Point Park

General information
- Location: Ferry Point Park; Bronx, NY 10465
- Coordinates: 40.805371°N 73.837299°W
- System: Ferry terminal

History
- Opened: December 28, 2021

Services
Preceding station	NYC Ferry	Following station
Terminus	Rockaway-Soundview	Soundview toward Rockaway
Location

Located in Ferry Point Park, the Throgs Neck/Ferry Point Park stop opened on December 28, 2021, as an extension of the Soundview Line.

=== Brooklyn ===
==== Atlantic Avenue ====
Atlantic Avenue (Brooklyn Bridge Pier 6)
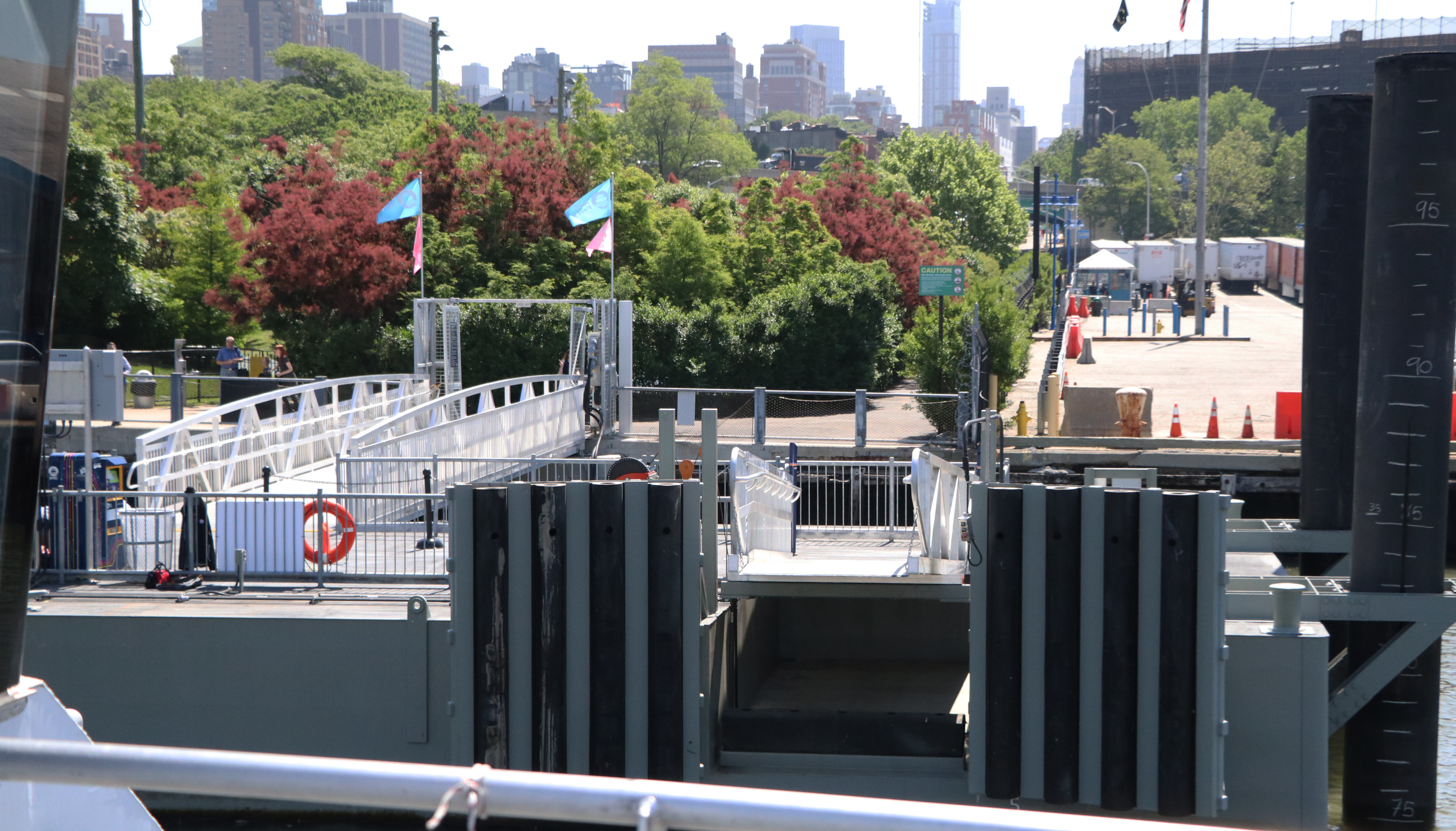

General information
- Location: Brooklyn Bridge Park Greenway; Brooklyn Heights, New York, 11201
- System: Ferry terminal
- Connections: NYCT Bus: B57, B61, B63

Services
Preceding station	NYC Ferry	Following station
Pier 11/Wall Street toward East 34th Street	South Brooklyn	Red Hook toward Governors Island
Pier 11/Wall Street toward East 34th Street	South Brooklyn (seasonal)	Red Hook toward Bay Ridge
Pier 11/Wall Street Terminus	St. George	Bay Ridge toward West Midtown

==== Bay Ridge ====
Bay Ridge

General information
- Location: American Veterans Memorial Pier; Bay Ridge Brooklyn, New York, 11220
- System: Ferry terminal
- Connections: NYCT Bus: B9, B64

Services
Preceding station	NYC Ferry	Following station
Sunset Park toward East 34th Street	South Brooklyn (seasonal)	Terminus
Atlantic Avenue toward Pier 11/Wall Street	St. George	St. George toward West Midtown
Pier 11/Wall Street Terminus	Coney Island Proposed, TBD	Coney Island Terminus

Bay Ridge is located on the north end of the 69th Street Pier in Bay Ridge, Brooklyn along the Verrazano Narrows. The stop opened along with the completion of the original South Brooklyn line to Wall St/Pier 11 on July 1, 2017. It is an intermediate stop on the St. George route and serves as the southern terminal of the South Brooklyn line on summer weekends.

In 2019, as part of a service expansion announcement, it was announced by NYC Ferry that a new route, called the Coney Island route, would open in 2021 and operate from Wall St/Pier 11 to Coney Island, with an intermediate stop at Bay Ridge. As a part of this change, Bay Ridge would no longer be the southern terminal of the South Brooklyn line, with service being replaced by the Coney Island route (which never opened).

==== Brooklyn Navy Yard ====
Brooklyn Navy Yard

General information
- Location: 63 Flushing Avenue; Brooklyn, New York
- System: Ferry terminal
- Connections: NYCT Bus: B57, B62, B67, B69

Services
Preceding station	NYC Ferry	Following station
Pier 11/Wall Street Terminus	Astoria	East 34th Street toward East 90th Street

The Brooklyn Navy Yard Ferry Terminal is located at Dock 72 in the Brooklyn Navy Yard, and opened on May 21, 2019. It is served by the Astoria route in both directions.

Nearby, connections are available to the B67 bus within the Navy Yard, and the B57, B62, and B69 buses along Flushing Avenue.

==== DUMBO ====
DUMBO (Brooklyn Bridge Pier 1)
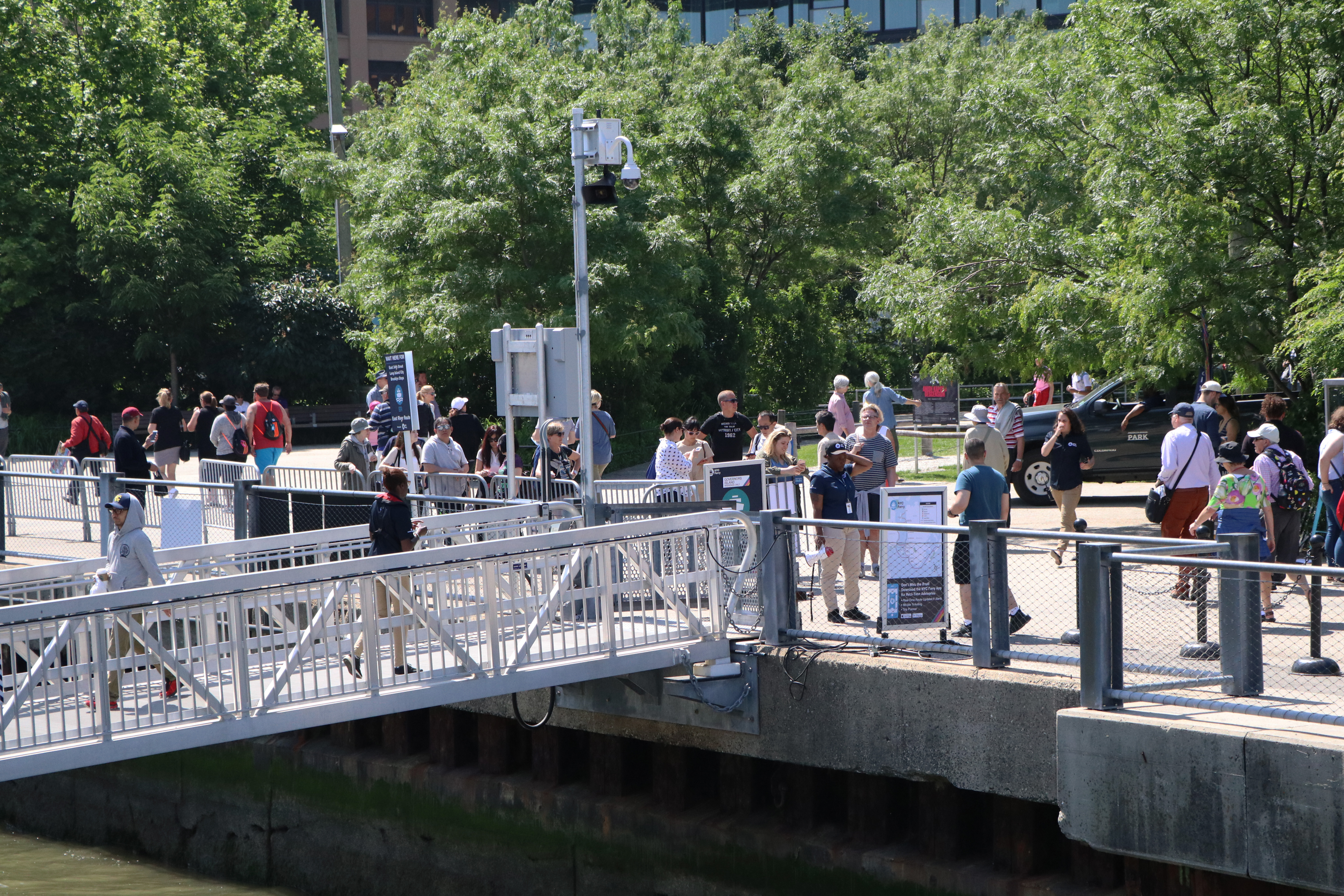

General information
- Location: Old Fulton Street and Furman Street; Dumbo, Brooklyn, New York, 11201
- Connections: NY Water Taxi; New York City Subway: (at Clark Street) (at High Street-Brooklyn Bridge) trains (at York Street); NYCT Bus: B25

Services
Preceding station	NYC Ferry	Following station
Pier 11/Wall Street Terminus	East River	South Williamsburg toward East 34th Street

Located at the foot of Fulton Street, at the former Fulton Ferry landing, adjacent to Brooklyn Bridge Park's Pier 1. DUMBO is served by the East River route.

==== Greenpoint ====
Greenpoint
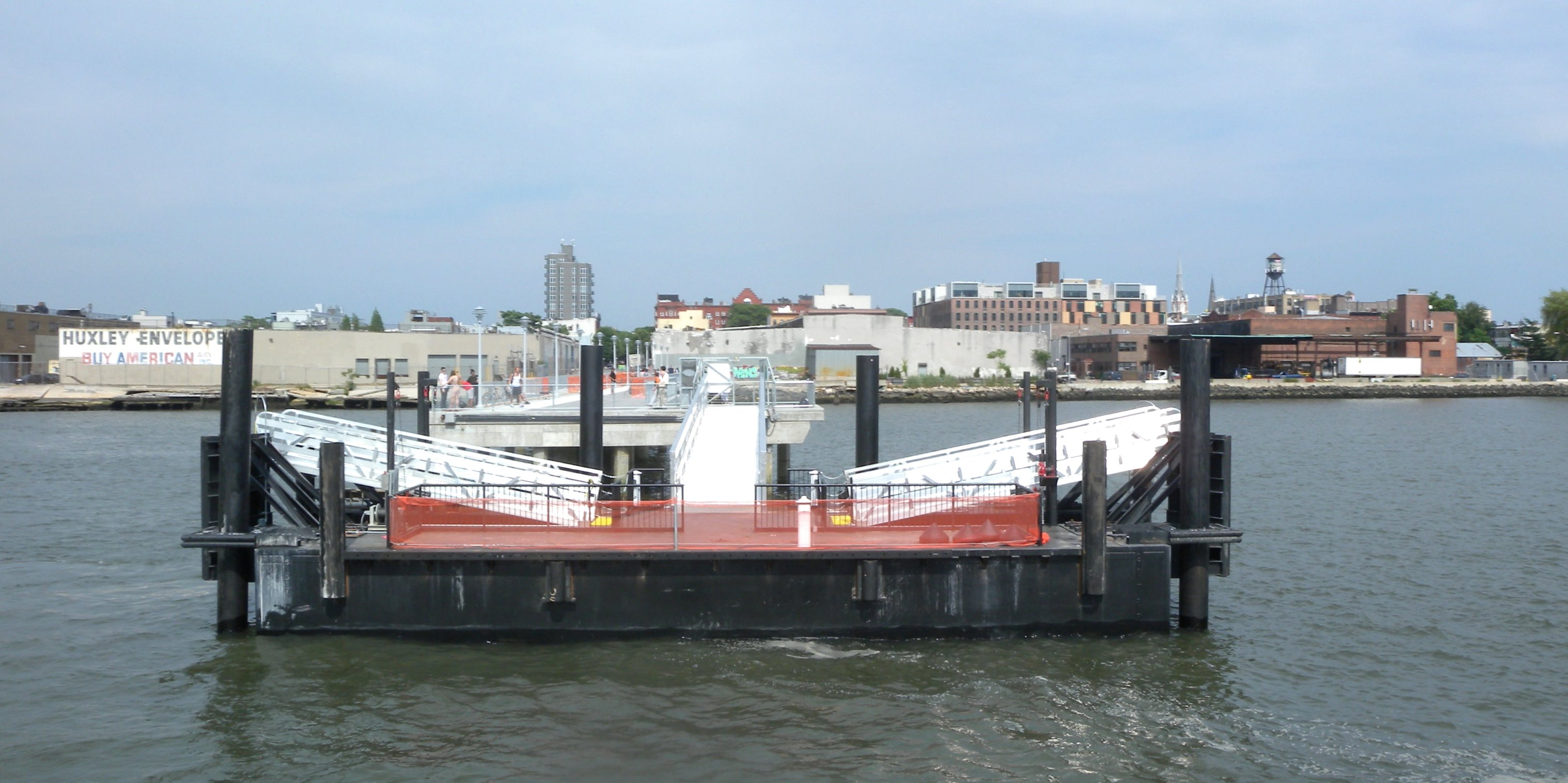

General information
- Location: 10 India Street; Greenpoint, Brooklyn
- System: Ferry terminal
- Connections: New York City Subway: at Greenpoint Avenue; NYCT Bus: B24, B32, B43, B62

Services
Preceding station	NYC Ferry	Following station
North Williamsburg toward Pier 11/Wall Street	East River	Hunters Point South toward East 34th Street

Located on the India Street Pier at 10 India Street in Greenpoint, Brooklyn along the East River. Served only by the East River route. The stop was temporary closed from May 2021 through November 2022 to address structural problems with the landing. During weekends (except during the winter) and weekday rush hours, the East River line is split into "A" and "B" branches, and only the "B" branch stops here. At other times, all ferries stop here.

==== North Williamsburg ====
North Williamsburg
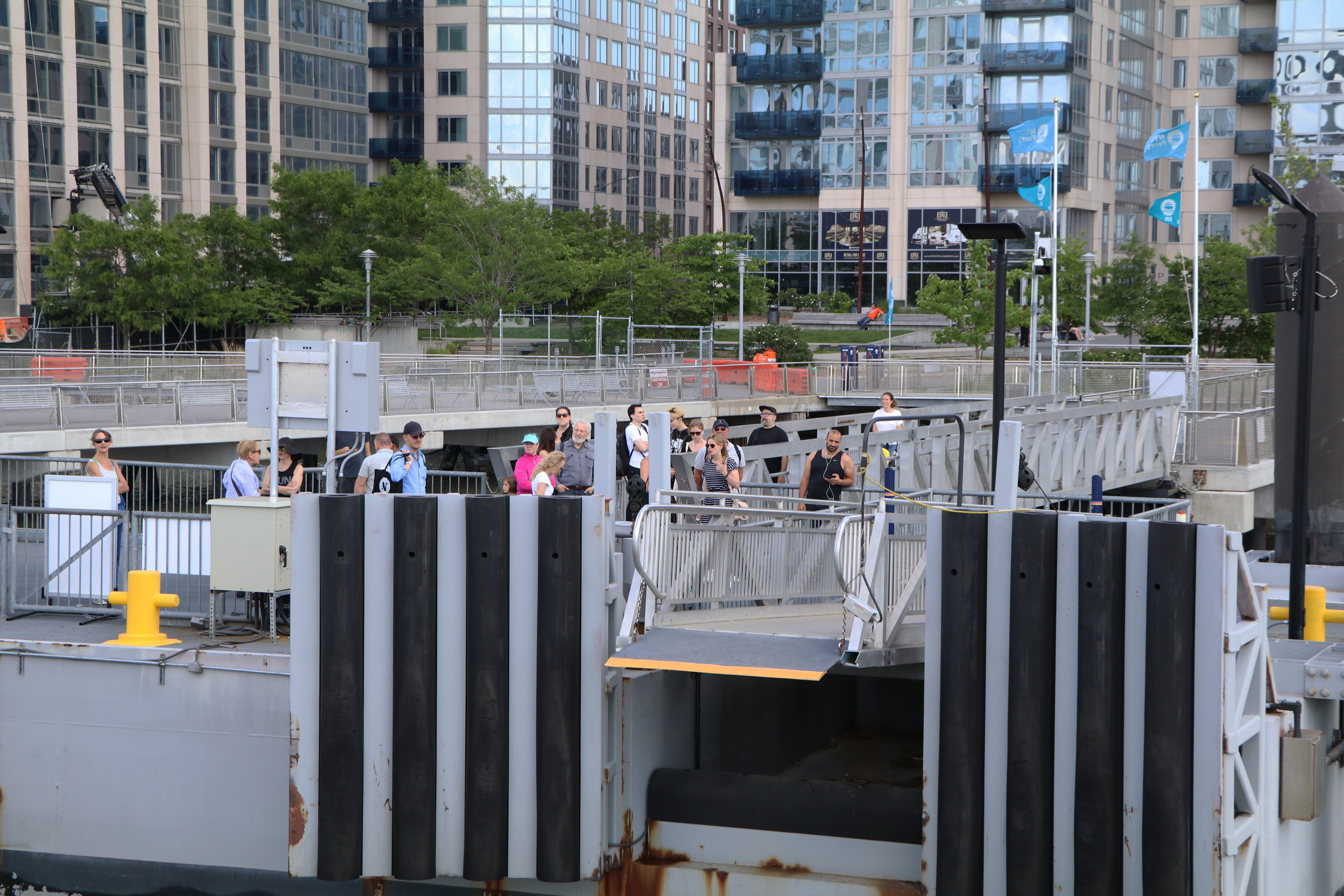

General information
- Location: North 6th Street and Kent Avenue; Williamsburg, NY 11249
- System: Ferry terminal
- Connections: New York City Subway: at Bedford Avenue; NYCT bus: B32, B62, Q59

Services
Preceding station	NYC Ferry	Following station
South Williamsburg toward Pier 11/Wall Street	East River	Greenpoint toward East 34th Street

During weekends (except during the winter) and weekday rush hours, the East River line is split into "A" and "B" branches, and only the "A" branch stops here. At other times, all ferries stop here.

==== Red Hook ====
Red Hook (Atlantic Basin)
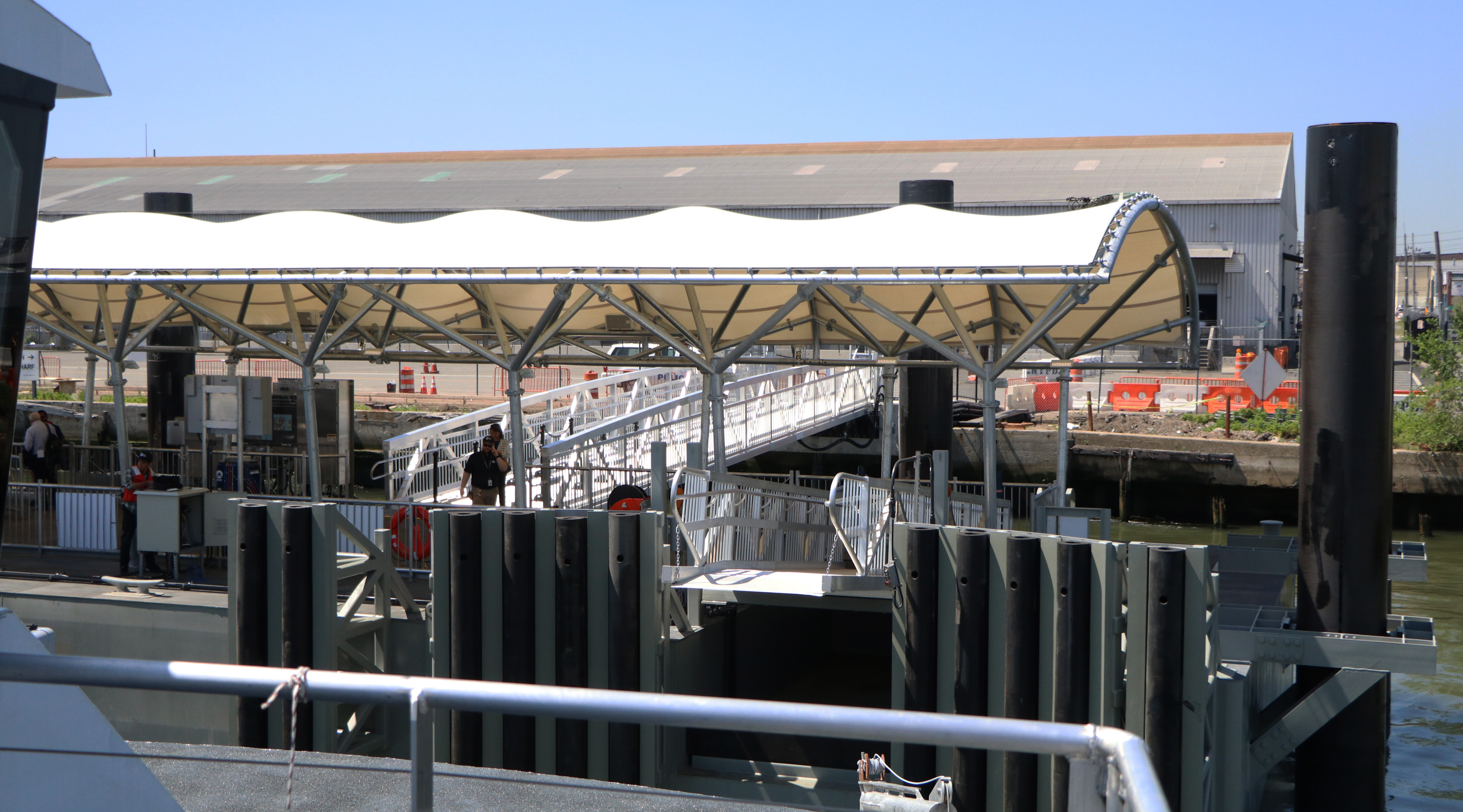

General information
- Location: Ferris Street and Clinton Wharf; Red Hook Brooklyn, New York, 11231
- System: Ferry terminal
- Connections: Brooklyn Cruise Terminal (at Pier 12); NYCT Bus: B57, B61

Services
Preceding station	NYC Ferry	Following station
Atlantic Avenue toward East 34th Street	South Brooklyn	Governors Island Terminus
Atlantic Avenue toward East 34th Street	South Brooklyn (seasonal)	Sunset Park toward Bay Ridge

The Red Hook Terminal is located in the Atlantic Basin next door to the Brooklyn Cruise Terminal.

==== South Williamsburg ====
During weekends (except during the winter) and weekday rush hours, the East River line is split into "A" and "B" branches, and only the "B" branch stops here. At other times, all ferries stop here.

South Williamsburg
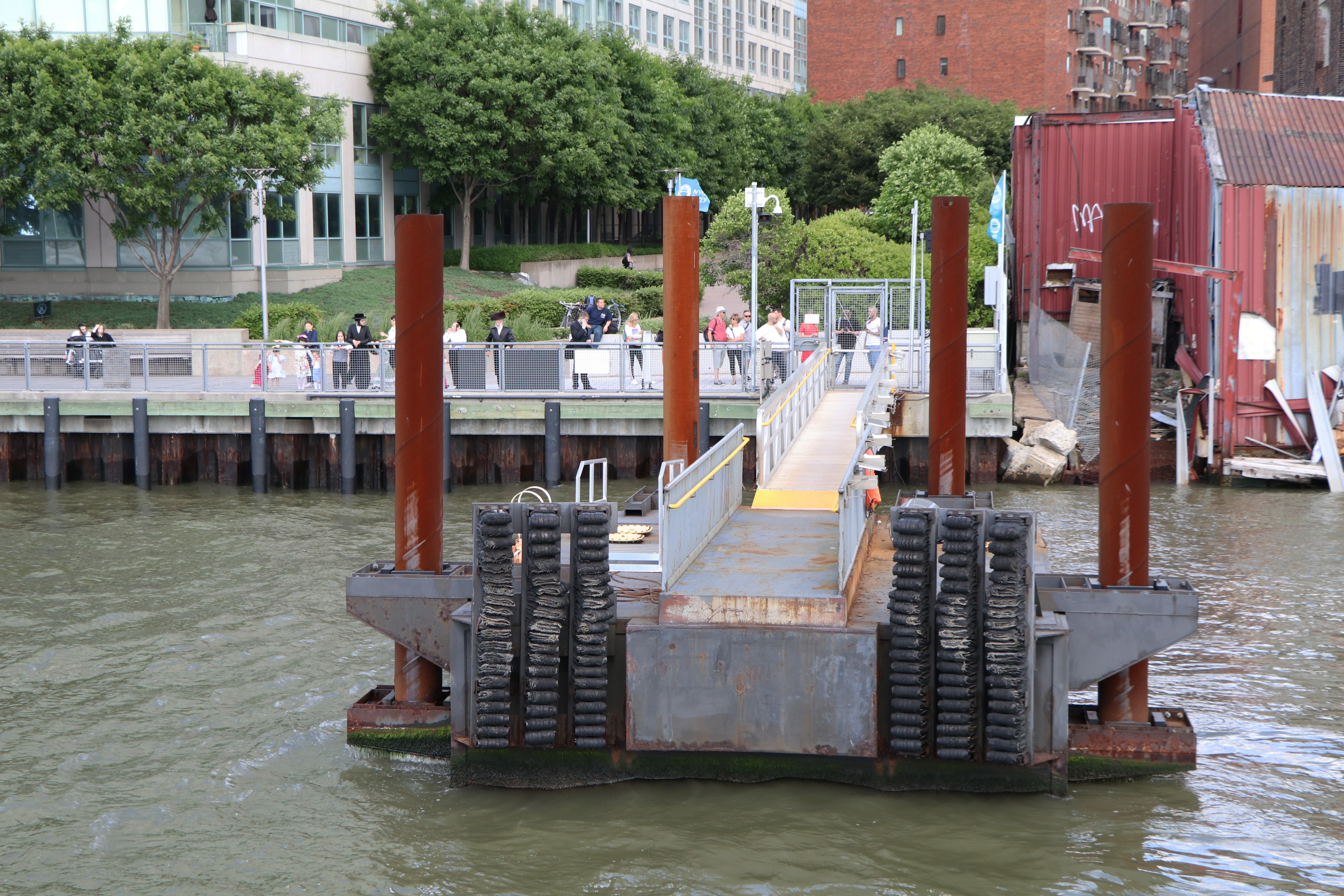

General information
- Location: 440 Kent Avenue; Williamsburg, NY 11249
- System: Temporarily Closed Ferry terminal
- Connections: New York City Subway: at Marcy Avenue; NYCT Bus: B24, B32, B39, B44, B44 SBS, B46, B60, B62, B67, Q54, Q59

Services
Preceding station	NYC Ferry	Following station
DUMBO toward Pier 11/Wall Street	East River	North Williamsburg toward East 34th Street

==== Sunset Park ====
Sunset Park
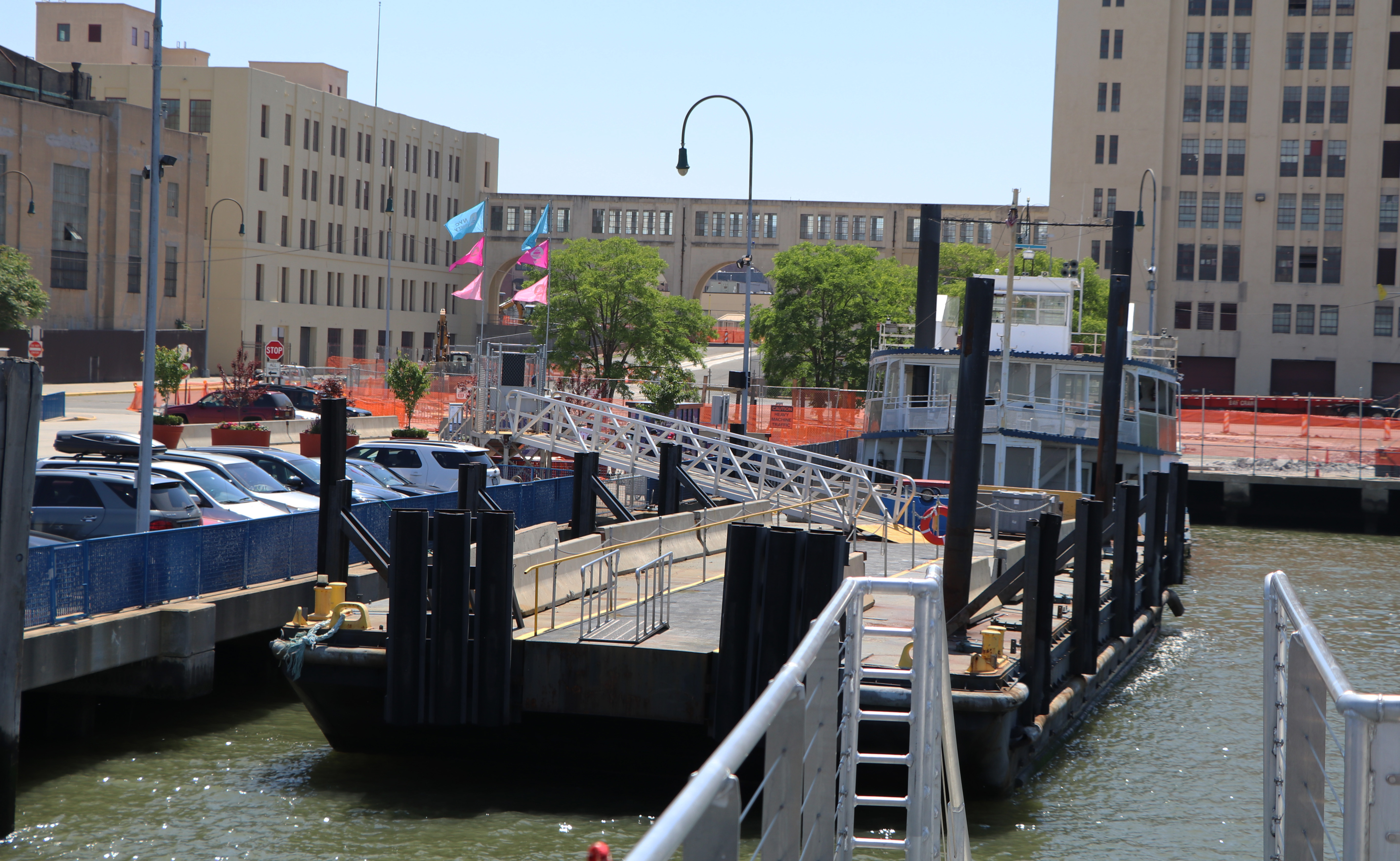

General information
- Location: 140 58th Street
- Coordinates: 40.6455°N 74.02608°W
- System: Ferry terminal
- Connections: New York City Subway: trains at 59th Street; NYCT Bus: B9, B11, B37, B63

Services
Preceding station	NYC Ferry	Following station
Red Hook toward East 34th Street	South Brooklyn (seasonal)	Bay Ridge Terminus
Pier 11/Wall Street Terminus	Rockaway	Rockaway Terminus
Location

Located at the Brooklyn Army Terminal in Sunset Park, Brooklyn. Served by the South Brooklyn route on summer weekends and the Rockaway-Soundview route at all times except nights. The landing is also used by the employee shuttle for NYU Langone Health that runs to the East 34th Street Ferry Landing and is operated by New York Water Taxi.

The landing was rebuilt and opened in 2018, with an all new waiting area.

=== Manhattan ===
==== Corlears Hook ====
Corlears Hook

General information
- Coordinates: 40.71018°N 73.979238°W
- System: Ferry terminal
- Connections: NYCT Bus: M14A SBS, M14D SBS, M21, M22

Services
Preceding station	NYC Ferry	Following station
East 34th Street Terminus	South Brooklyn	Pier 11/Wall Street toward Governors Island
East 34th Street Terminus	South Brooklyn (seasonal)	Pier 11/Wall Street toward Bay Ridge
Location

Corlears Hook is on the South Brooklyn line of the NYC Ferry system. Located at Corlears Hook Park and near Grand St, it is served by the South Brooklyn line at all times except late nights.

The stop opened along with the completion of the Lower East Side line to Long Island City on August 29, 2018. It was originally served by the Lower East Side route in both directions between August 29, 2018 and May 18, 2020. The next northbound stop was Stuyvesant Cove, with the next southbound stop being Wall St, the last stop.

On May 18, 2020, the Lower East Side route was discontinued, and service at this stop was replaced by an extended South Brooklyn route, which became its northern terminal. However, uptown service was not restored as a part of this service change. In 2025, uptown service was restored.

==== East 34th Street ====
East 34th Street Ferry Landing is served by the Astoria, East River, South Brooklyn, and Soundview lines. The landing is also used by New York Water Taxi and Seastreak as well as event ferries to Yankee Stadium, Randall's Island, and Citi Field.

==== East 90th Street ====
East 90th Street (Yorkville)

General information
- System: Ferry terminal
- Connections: New York City Subway: at 96th Street-2nd Avenue; NYCT Bus: M15, M15 SBS, M31, M86 SBS

Services
Preceding station	NYC Ferry	Following station
Soundview toward Throgs Neck/Ferry Point Park	Rockaway-Soundview	East 34th Street toward Rockaway
Astoria toward Pier 11/Wall Street	Astoria	Terminus

This stop was opened along with the Soundview line in August 2018. The Astoria route was extended to end at East 90th St on August 22, 2020.

==== Governors Island ====
Governors Island

General information
- Location: Gov. Island/Yankee Pier
- Coordinates: 40.686854°N 74.017119°W
- System: Ferry terminal

Services
Preceding station	NYC Ferry	Following station
Red Hook toward East 34th Street	South Brooklyn	Terminus
Pier 11/Wall Street Terminus	Governors Island	Terminus
Location

This stop is served by the Governors Island Ferry shuttle during summer weekends only, and the South Brooklyn route at all other times. Prior to 2019, the East River and South Brooklyn ferries were extended from Wall St to Governors Island during summer weekends, before being replaced by the Governors Island shuttle in 2019. The South Brooklyn route was rerouted to serve Governors Island again between Red Hook & Sunset Park at all times except when the Governors Island shuttle is running.

==== Roosevelt Island ====
Roosevelt Island
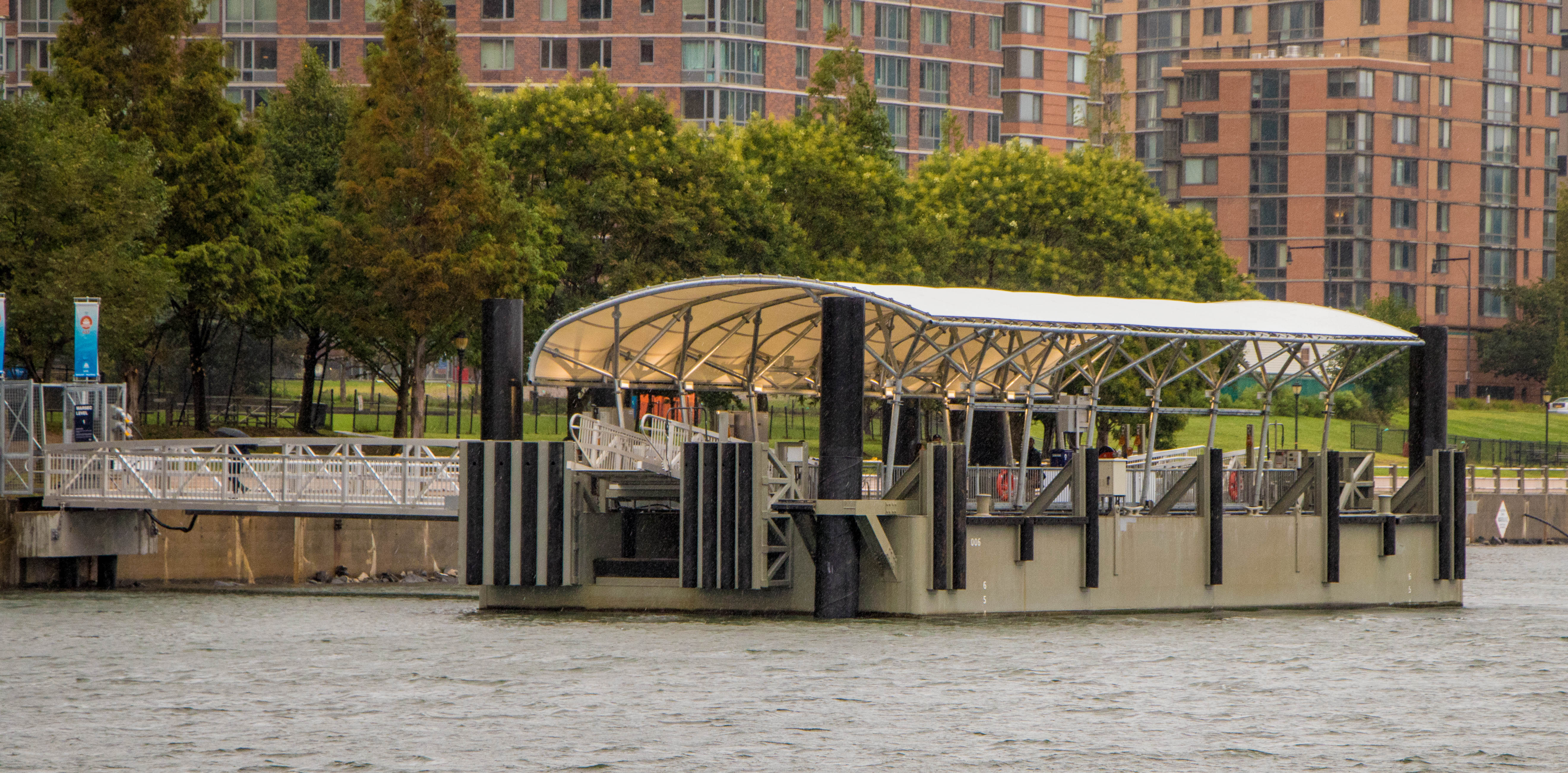

General information
- Coordinates: 40.772114°N 73.937178°W
- System: Ferry terminal
- Connections: Roosevelt Island Tramway; New York City Subway: at Roosevelt Island; MTA Bus: Q102; RIOC Red Bus

Services
Preceding station	NYC Ferry	Following station
Long Island City toward Pier 11/Wall Street	Astoria	Astoria toward East 90th Street
Location

Located underneath the Queensboro Bridge, NYC Ferry is one of three public transit options connecting Roosevelt Island with Manhattan, the other two being the F train and the Roosevelt Island Tramway.

==== Stuyvesant Cove ====
Stuyvesant Cove

General information
- System: Ferry terminal
- Connections: New York City Subway: at 23rd Street–Baruch College; NYCT Bus: M1, M2, M3, M9, M14A SBS, M14D SBS, M15, M15 SBS, M23 SBS, M34 SBS, M34A SBS, M101, M102, M103, SIM3, SIM6, SIM10, SIM11, SIM31, X37, X38, QM63, QM64, QM68; MTA Bus: BM2, BM3, BM4, QM21

Services
Preceding station	NYC Ferry	Following station
East 34th Street toward Throgs Neck/Ferry Point Park	Rockaway-Soundview	Pier 11/Wall Street toward Rockaway

Located in Stuyvesant Cove Park at 20th Street, it originally opened as part of the Lower East Side line in August 2018. When the Lower East Side line was discontinued, it was added as a stop to the Soundview (later Rockaway-Soundview) line on May 18, 2020.

==== Wall Street/Pier 11 ====
Pier 11/Wall Street is the terminal for all NYC Ferry routes, except for the Rockaway-Soundview and South Brooklyn lines. The pier has five berths each with two ferry slips, and is also used by NY Waterway, Seastreak, and tour boats.

=== Queens ===
==== Astoria ====
Astoria
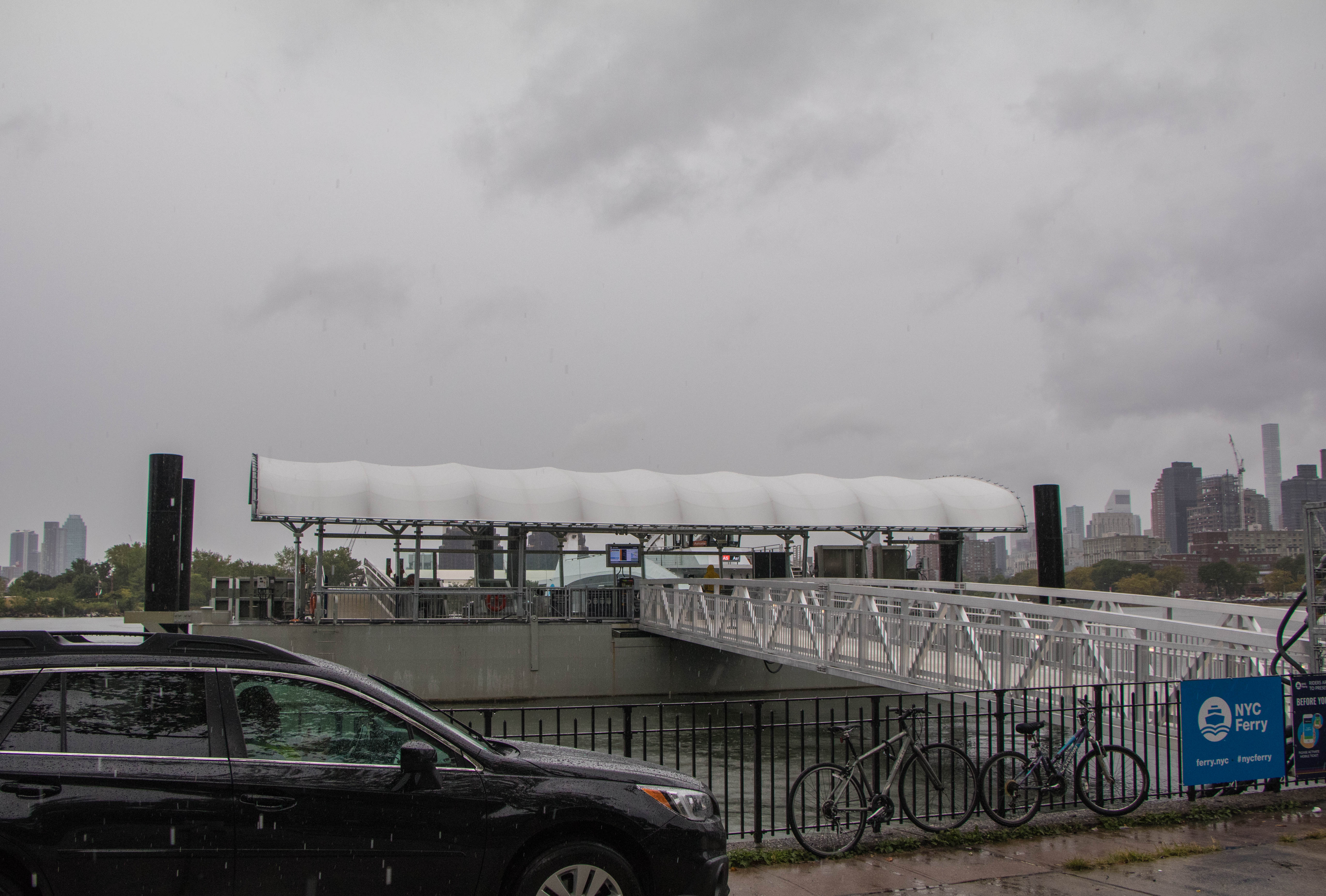

General information
- Location: 3-10 Astoria Boulevard, Astoria, Queens
- Coordinates: 40.772114°N 73.937178°W
- System: Ferry terminal
- Connections: NYCT Bus: B62; MTA Bus: Q18, Q19, Q103

Services
Preceding station	NYC Ferry	Following station
Roosevelt Island toward Pier 11/Wall Street	Astoria	East 90th Street Terminus
Location

The Astoria terminal is located in Hallets Cove between the Astoria Houses public housing project and Socrates Sculpture Park. Long Island City Community Boathouse runs an introductory kayaking program in the cove, and objected to the placement of the ferry terminal.

==== Hunters Point South ====
Hunters Point South
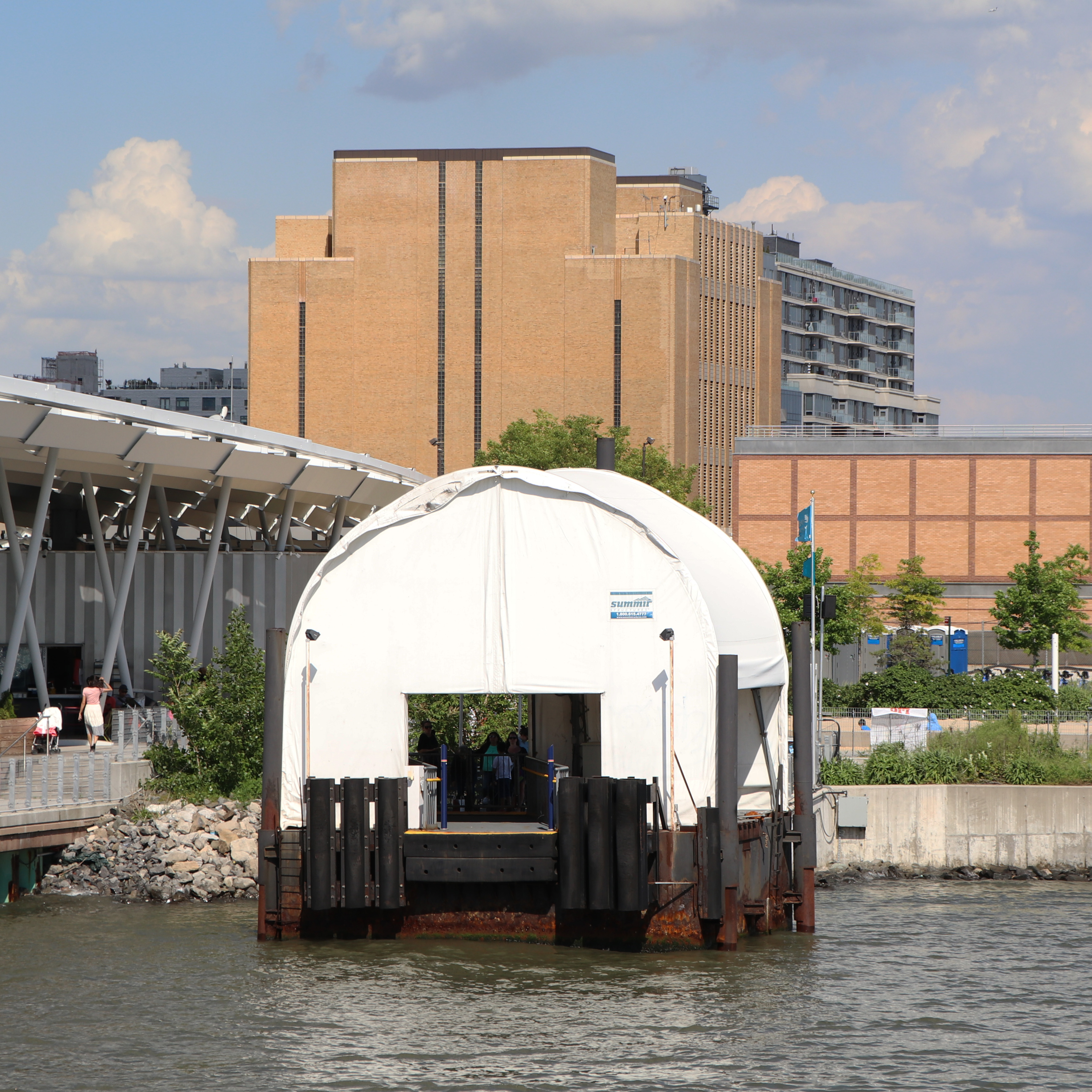

General information
- Location: 54th Avenue on 2nd Street; Long Island City, New York
- System: Ferry terminal
- Connections: NY Water Taxi; New York City Subway: at Vernon Boulevard-Jackson Avenue; NYCT Bus: B32, B62, Q67 (at 11th Street and Jackson Avenue); MTA Bus: Q101, Q103; LIRR: City Terminal Zone (at Long Island City)

Services
Preceding station	NYC Ferry	Following station
Greenpoint toward Pier 11/Wall Street	East River	East 34th Street toward East 34th Street

Located south of Long Island City in Hunters Point South, it is on the East River line. During weekends (except during the winter) and weekday rush hours, the East River line is split into "A" and "B" branches, and only the "A" branch stops here. At other times, all ferries stop here.

==== Long Island City ====
Long Island City (Gantry Plaza State Park)
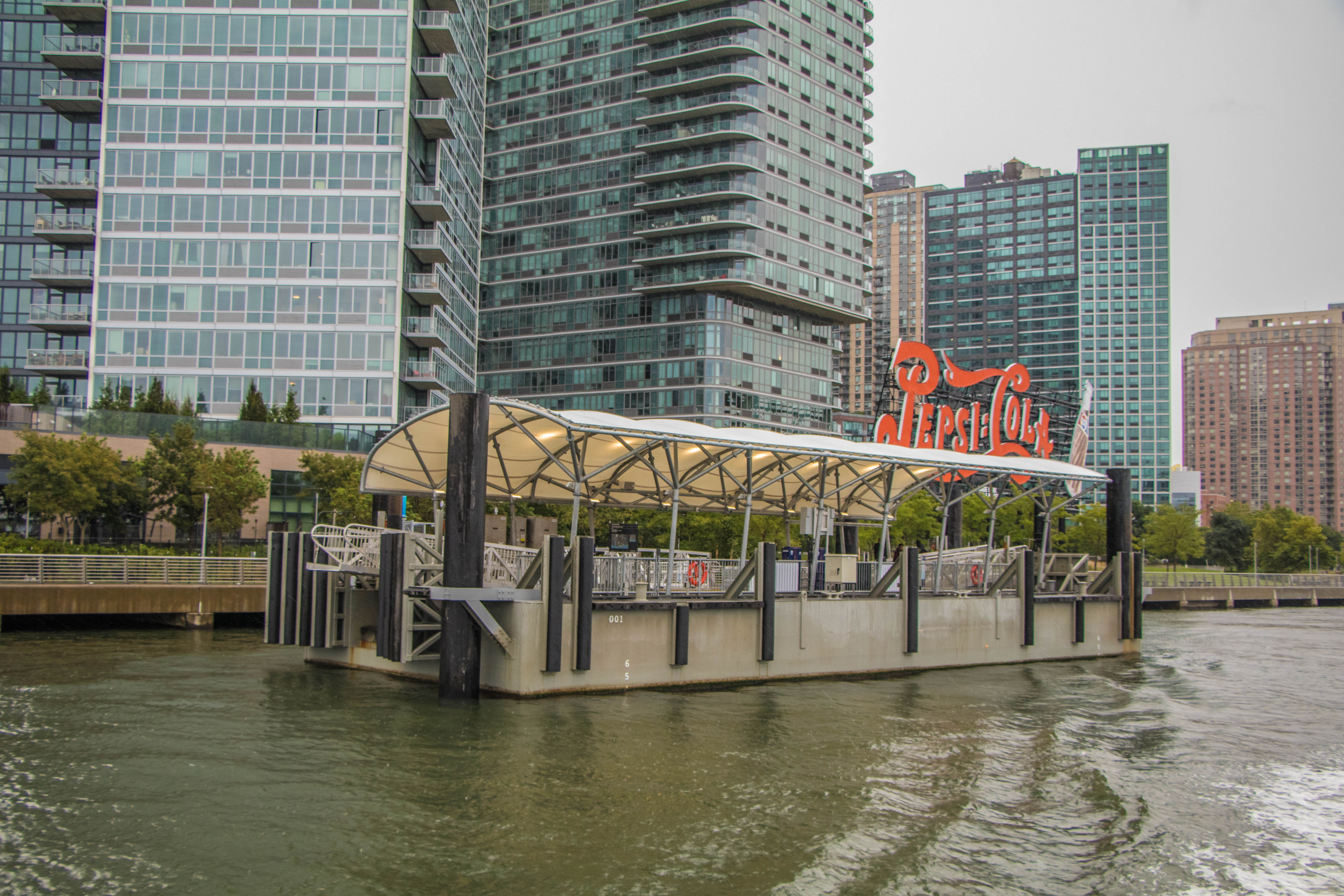

General information
- Location: 46th Avenue and Center Boulevard; Long Island City, New York
- System: Ferry terminal
- Connections: New York City Subway: at Vernon Boulevard-Jackson Avenue; NYCT Bus: B32, B62, Q67 (at 11th Street and Jackson Avenue); MTA Bus: Q101, Q103; LIRR: City Terminal Zone (at Long Island City)

Services
Preceding station	NYC Ferry	Following station
East 34th Street toward Pier 11/Wall Street	Astoria	Roosevelt Island toward East 90th Street

The Long Island City Ferry Terminal is located at the north end of Gantry Plaza State Park. It is served by the Astoria route in both directions.

==== Rockaway ====
Rockaway
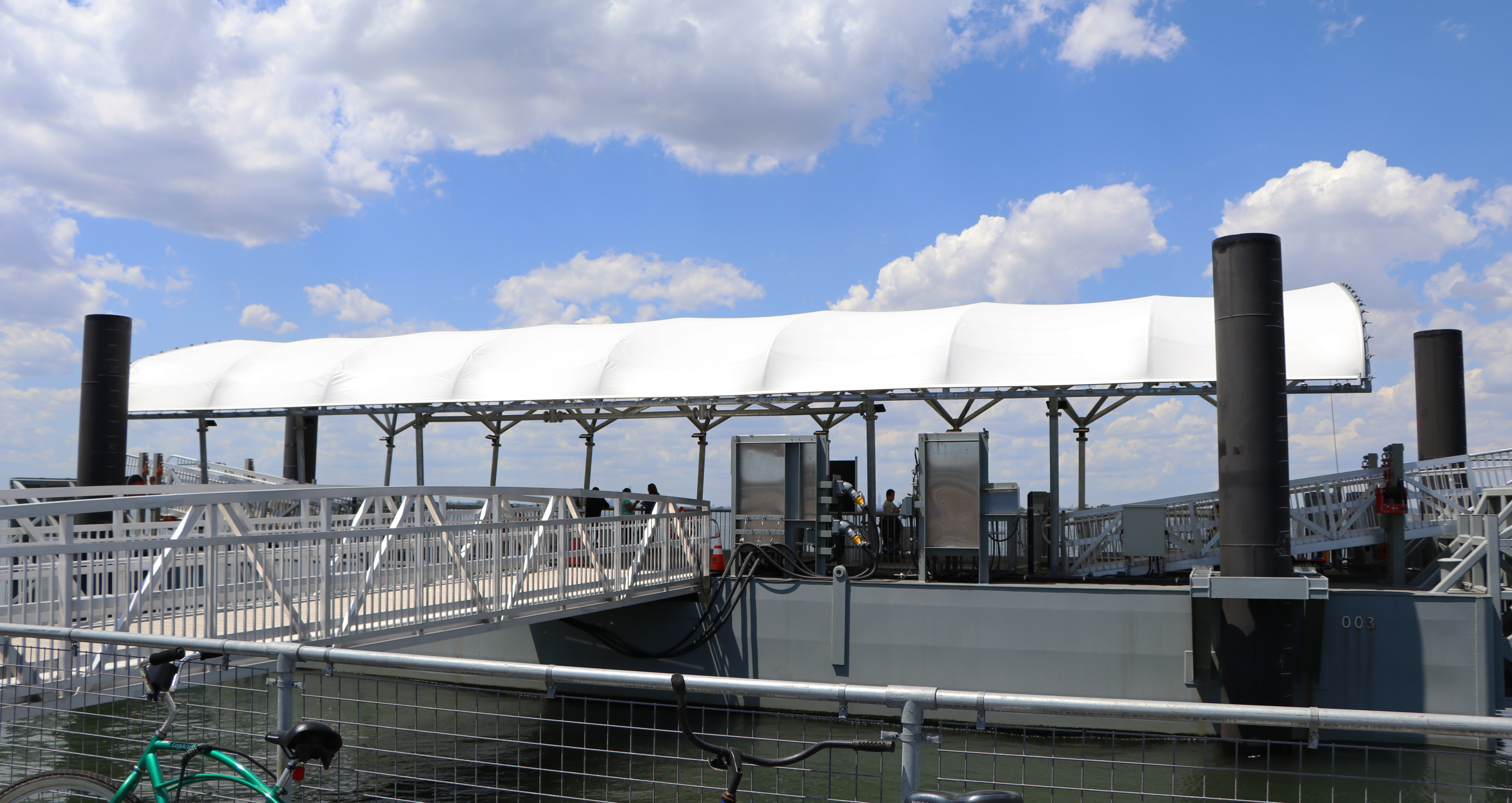

General information
- Location: Beach 108th Street and Beach Channel Drive; Rockaway Park, New York
- System: Ferry terminal
- Connections: New York City Subway: (at Rockaway Park-Beach 116th Street); MTA Bus: Q22, Q35, Q53 SBS, QM16; RES Shuttle Bus; Beach 35th Street; RWS Shuttle Bus; Beach 169th Street

Services
Preceding station	NYC Ferry	Following station
Sunset Park toward Pier 11/Wall Street	Rockaway	Terminus

Located on the north side of Rockaway Park in Jamaica Bay. Served only by the Rockaway-Soundview route, however the ferry terminal also has shuttle buses towards Edgemere to the east, and Jacob Riis Park to the west.

=== Staten Island ===
==== St. George ====
St. George

General information
- Location: Empire Outlets, Staten Island
- Coordinates: 40.64515°N 74.07470°W
- System: Ferry terminal
- Connections: Staten Island Ferry at St. George Terminal; Staten Island Railway at St. George Terminal; NYCT Bus: S40, S42, S44, S46, S48, S51, S52, S61, S62, S66, S74, S76, S78, S81, S84, S86, S90, S91, S92, S94, S96, S98

Services
Preceding station	NYC Ferry	Following station
Bay Ridge toward Pier 11/Wall Street	St. George	Battery Park City toward West Midtown
Location

This stop opened in late August 2021.

=== Unused landings ===
==== Coney Island ====
Coney Island

General information
- Location: Coney Island (in Kaiser Park, Brooklyn)
- Coordinates: 40°34′45″N 73°59′46″W
- System: Ferry terminal
- Connections: NYCT Bus: B9, B64

Services
Preceding station	NYC Ferry	Following station
Bay Ridge toward Pier 11/Wall Street	Coney Island Proposed, TBD	Terminus
Location

This stop will serve as the southern terminal of the Coney Island line. Never was opened because the Coney Island Pier was too shallow.
