= Pier 11/Wall Street =

Ferry terminal in Manhattan, New York

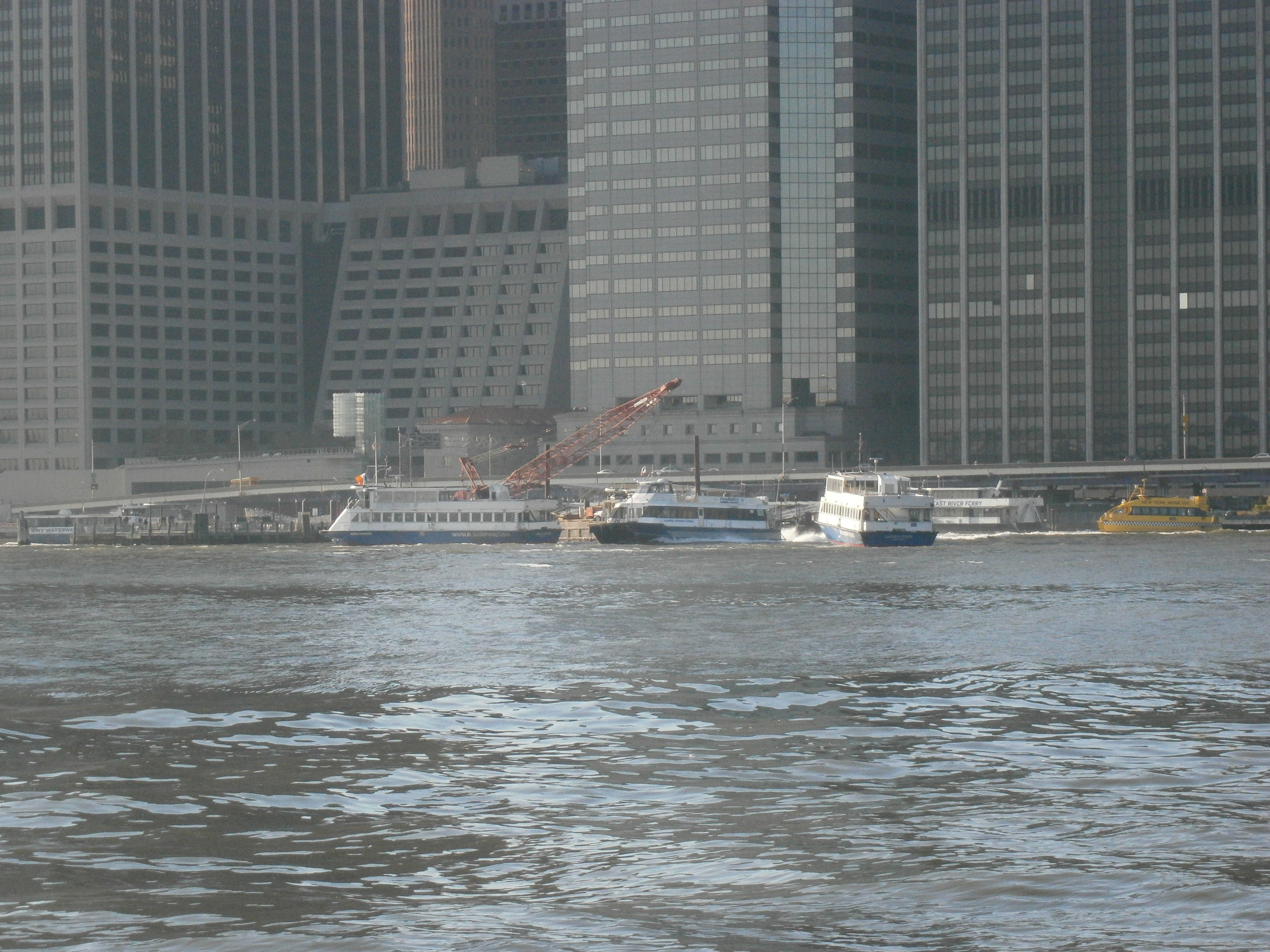
- Ferries at the landing on Pier 11 seen from across the East River

General information
- Coordinates: 40°42′11″N 74°0′22″W
- System: Ferry terminal
- Owner: NYCDOT
- Lines: NY Waterway; NYC Ferry
- Platforms: 5 (A, B, C, D, E)
- Connections: Downtown Connection; New York City Bus: M15, M15 SBS, M20, M55

Construction
- Parking: No
- Cycle facilities: Yes
- Accessible: Yes
- Architect: Smith-Miller + Hawkinson

History
- Opened: July 1986
- Rebuilt: 1996–2000

Passengers
- 2025: 2,937,325 per year

Services
Preceding station	NYC Ferry	Following station
Terminus	East River	DUMBO toward East 34th Street
Terminus	Governors Island	Governors Island Terminus
Stuyvesant Cove toward Throgs Neck/Ferry Point Park	Rockaway-Soundview	Sunset Park toward Rockaway
Corlears Hook toward East 34th Street	South Brooklyn	Atlantic Avenue toward Governors Island
Corlears Hook toward East 34th Street	South Brooklyn (seasonal)	Atlantic Avenue toward Bay Ridge
Terminus	Astoria	Brooklyn Navy Yard toward East 90th Street
Terminus	St. George	Atlantic Avenue toward West Midtown

Other services
NY Waterway
Location
- Location within New York City Location within New York Location within the United States

Pier 11/Wall Street is a pier providing slips to ferries and excursion boats on the East River in the Port of New York and New Jersey. It is located east of South Street and FDR Drive just south of Wall Street in Lower Manhattan, New York City. The ferry terminal has five landings (A, B, C, D, E), each with two berths, and is used by three privately owned companies.

Public transportation available within walking distance includes the New York City Subway's 1, N, R, and W trains at South Ferry – Whitehall Street and 2 and 3 trains at Wall Street; the M15, M15 SBS, M20, M55 New York City Bus routes, and the Staten Island Ferry at the Whitehall Terminal.

== History ==
=== Opening and early years ===
In January 1982, the New York City Department of Ports and Terminals announced plans to convert Pier 11 from a parking lot into a recreational facility with restaurants, entertainment and harbor cruises that would be open during the summer months and solicited proposals from concessionaires. The city's decision to repurpose the pier was based on its recent success in holding summer events at Pier 84 on the Hudson River. The pier opened to the public on June 1, 1982, with food concession stands and performances by dance companies; it also served as a departure point for excursion boats. The city envisioned that the pier would be used by office workers in the Financial District, particularly during the lunchtime hours. The pier was open on weekdays from 11 a.m. to 6 p.m. and on some evenings and holidays for special events. The use of the pier for summertime recreational purposes continued through 1985; during the winter months it reverted back to being used as a parking lot.

In July 1985, the city's Department of Ports and Terminals solicited bids from private operators to run a permanent commuter ferry service between Pier 11, the South Street Seaport and Fulton Ferry, Brooklyn as well to operate excursion boats and redevelop a former fireboat house at Fulton Ferry Landing. An experimental ferry service was operated between Fulton Ferry Landing and Pier 17 for a six-week period beginning in September 1985 to measure the demand for passengers and drew about 6,000 commuters a week. The department also solicited proposals from companies to build a floating dock near Wall Street to be used by ferries, leaving the selection of other destinations to be served by ferries up to private operators.

Ferry service to Pier 11 began in July 1986 with two boats operated by Direct Line Commuter Service providing service to Highlands, New Jersey during the morning and evening rush hours on weekdays. The route between the two points was only 19 miles (31 km) over water compared to 52 miles (84 km) miles by land. The new ferry service used two vessels that had originally transported workers to offshore oil fields in the Gulf of Mexico. The following month an experimental commuter ferry service began running between Roosevelt Island and Pier 11 on a two-month trial basis; the route used a 300-passenger vessel operated by Casco Bay Lines and made two trips each way during the morning and evening rush hours.

In October 1986, the city issued a waterborne transportation policy statement to further encourage the use of private ferries, make city-owned land available for docking sites, and streamline the process of issuing permits to operators. The policy also established that no public subsidies would be provided to ferry operators and that the city would not object to operators charging passengers premium fares. The following year, new commuter ferry services began operating between Pier 11 and Fulton Ferry in Brooklyn, Breezy Point in Queens, and Bayonne, Elizabeth, Fort Lee, Jersey City, Keansburg, and Keyport in New Jersey. The same year also saw the establishment of the Pan Am Water Shuttle, which commenced service in August 1987 between Pier 11 and the Marine Air Terminal at LaGuardia Airport and was designed for business travelers with ferry schedules aligned with Pan Am Shuttle flights to Boston Logan and Washington National airports. In 1988, new commuter ferry services began operating between Pier 11 and Bay Ridge and Sheepshead Bay in Brooklyn. To celebrate the increase in private ferries serving New York City, including the 13 new routes which began operating within two years after the city issued its waterborne transportation policy statement, Mayor Ed Koch proclaimed September 22, 1988, as "New York Harbor Ferry Day" and a lunchtime event was held at Pier 11 to mark the occasion with 20 ferry vessels offering free rides to the public.

Several attempts were made at providing high-speed ferry service between Pier 11 and Nassau County on Long Island, but each one failed to attract enough customers and was discontinued. A route to Glen Cove began operation in March 1989 but only lasted for six weeks. In April 1990, a route to Inwood in the Five Towns area began operating and was shut down five months later. A second attempt at providing service to Glen Cove began in May 2001 and lasted through October 2002.

In April 1989, TNT Hydrolines Inc. (now Seastreak) took over Direct Line's routes operating to Highlands and Keyport and introduced high-speed ferry service using an 80-foot (24 m) catamaran that could travel up to 35 mph (30 kn), which cut the travel time from 55 minutes to 35 minutes. It was the first time a catamaran was used for commuter service or excursions in New York Harbor. TNT Hydrolines added service from Atlantic Highlands, New Jersey to Pier 11 in June 1990 and discontinued its service between Pier 11 and Keyport the following month.

Pier 11 has been used by some of the ferries providing service to New York Mets and New York Yankees baseball games. In August 1989, a ferry service operated by American Skimmer starting running from Pier 11 to the World's Fair Marina to provide service to Shea Stadium. Ferry service from Pier 11 to weekday games at Yankee Stadium began in 1997 by Harbor Shuttle Inc., a company that at the time also operated a commuter ferry from Mariners Harbor, Staten Island to Pier 11 via Bayonne. In 2010, New York Water Taxi began operating a free shuttle to Yankee Stadium and Citi Field that was sponsored by Delta Air Lines.

The Pan Am Water Shuttle was rebranded as the Delta Water Shuttle in 1991, when the Pan Am Shuttle was taken over by Delta Air Lines and became the Delta Shuttle. Ferry service between Pier 11 and LaGuardia Airport continued until December 2000.

=== Reconstruction of pier ===
By the mid-1990s, Pier 11 was classified as being "structurally unsound"; the original pier was supported by wooden piles that were being damaged by marine borers. The entire pier was demolished and rebuilt as a concrete structure to serve as a new ferry landing as part of a New York City Economic Development Corporation (NYCEDC)-led project that also included the development of an adjacent waterfront esplanade. Ferry operations were maintained at the site during the course of the four-year project, which spanned from 1996 through 2000. Ferries began operating to the reconstructed pier in December 1999 and the new terminal building opened to the public in November 2000.

New York Water Taxi began its first stint of service in May 1997 as a hop-on, hop-off service for commuters and tourists, including Pier 11 as one of six stops on a route from Fulton Ferry in Brooklyn to the Intrepid Museum, but stopped running two months later after failing to secure two of its other planned landing sites adjacent to major tourist destinations (Battery Park and the South Street Seaport). The company's second attempt at providing a water taxi service was launched in September 2002, which operated between select locations in Brooklyn and Manhattan (including Pier 11) during weekday commuter periods and added additional stops in Manhattan during weekends and the midday period on weekdays.

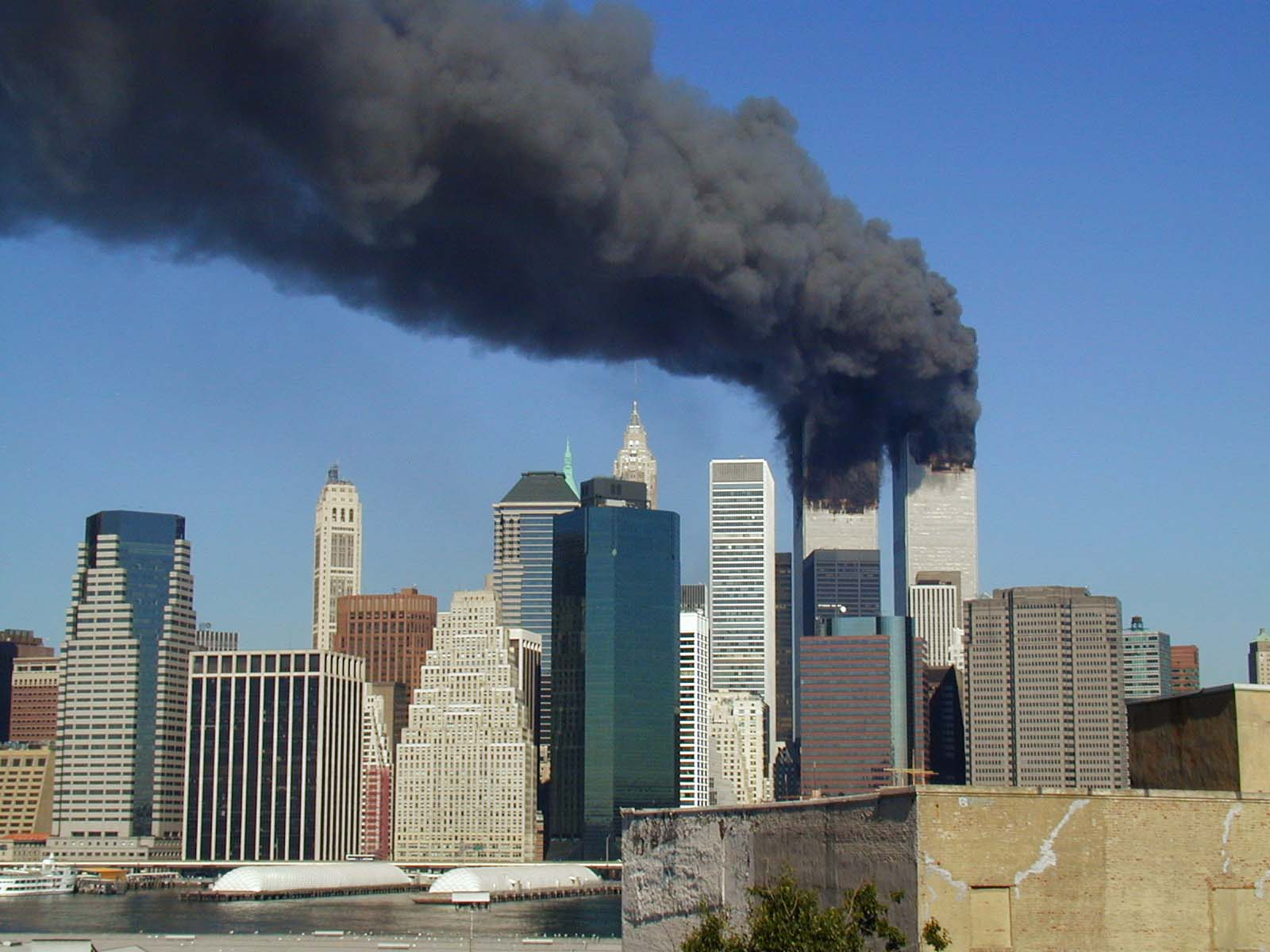
The September 11 attacks, with Pier 11 and the Floating Hospital visible at the bottom left

Pier 11 served as the last regular home of the Floating Hospital, an outpatient center located on a barge that offered health care and other services to poor and homeless persons. In the late 1990s, the Floating Hospital was facing eviction by the city as Pier 11 was scheduled to be demolished and rebuilt. The barge was towed to Pier 17 on September 15, 2001, to make way for increased ferry service to Lower Manhattan following the September 11 attacks on the World Trade Center. The Floating Hospital was unable to return to Pier 11 due to increased ferry usage and eventually became a land-based facility.

When the ferry terminal at the World Financial Center was closed to the general public immediately after the September 11 attacks, the trans-Hudson ferries operating at this location were rerouted to use Pier 11. Two barges were added to Pier 11 within a week of the attacks, increasing the total number of available slips to ten, but passenger queueing remained an issue and prompted the Port Authority of New York and New Jersey to open a ferry terminal at Pier A in Battery Park in November 2001 to accommodate some of the trans-Hudson ferry routes. In June 2002, Pier 11 was accommodating over 17,600 daily riders on weekdays, nearly triple the number of passengers that had used the terminal before September 11, 2001. Much of this increase was a result of the new routes that had been implemented to Hoboken Terminal and Jersey City (Colgate and Liberty Harbor Marina) and increases in demand for the existing routes serving Highlands and Weehawken.

Before September 11, 2001, NY Waterway had operated two trans-Hudson ferry routes at Pier 11 with service to Port Imperial in Weehawken and Port Liberté in Jersey City; service on the Port Imperial route began operating in 2000. The company expanded its service from Pier 11 to New Jersey to include a new route to Belford in October 2002; this route was subsequently taken over by Seastreak in October 2022.

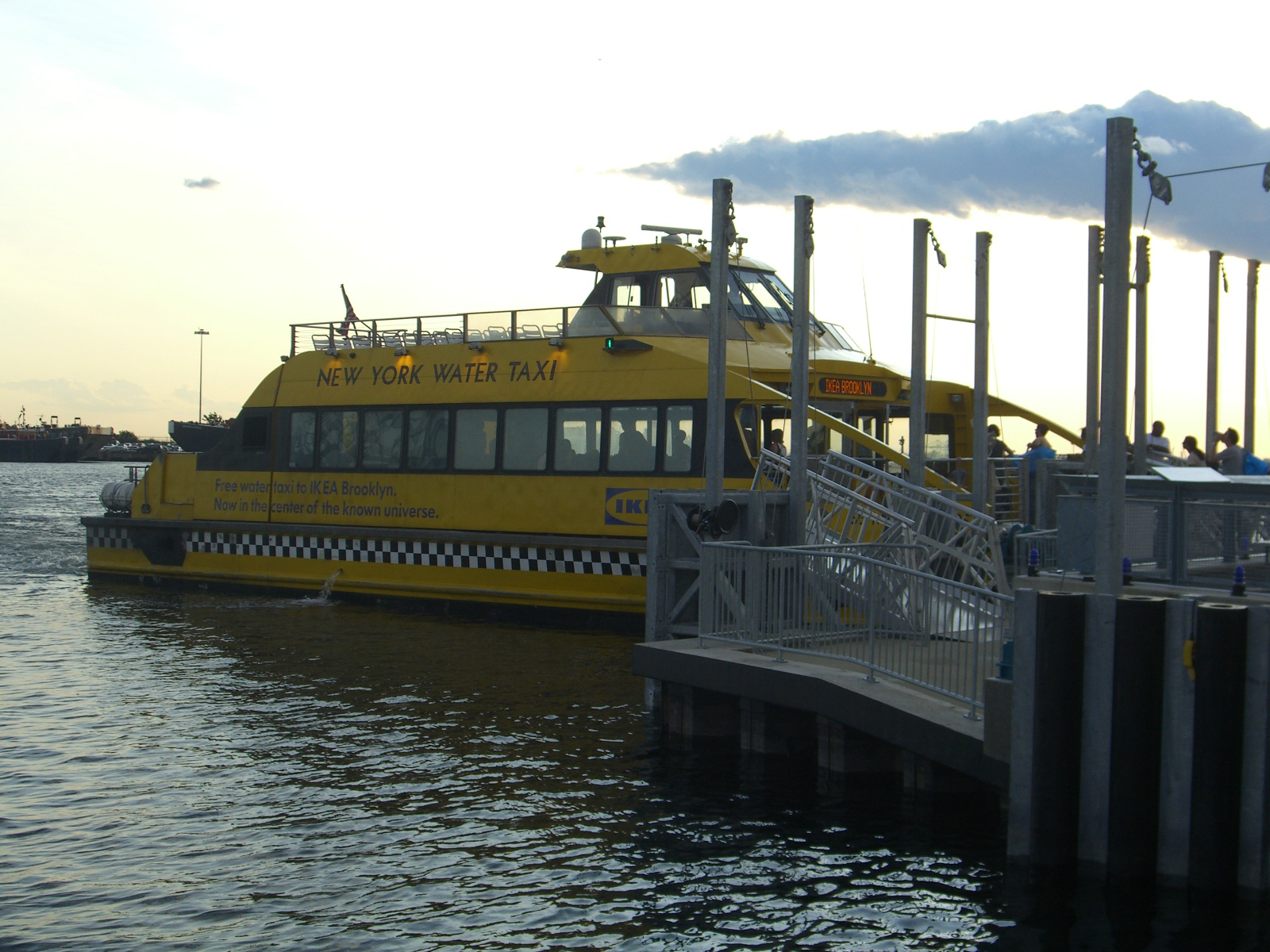
IKEA Express ferry operated by New York Water Taxi at Pier 11 in 2008

In June 2008, New York Water Taxi began operation of a ferry route to the IKEA store in Red Hook, Brooklyn. The free service was implemented as a measure to improve transportation access to the new store but was not limited to use by store customers. The overall demand for the ferry by shoppers and non-shoppers was so high that the following year a $5 fare was charged for the service on weekdays, except for passengers that spent more than $10 in the store. Ferry service on weekends remained free of charge. The IKEA ferry service was taken over by NY Waterway in 2021.

After a request for bids, NYCEDC in 2011 awarded NY Waterway a three-year contract and a $3 million annual subsidy to operate ferry service on the East River. The new service, which was called the East River Ferry, began operating in June 2011 and included Pier 11 as one of its two stops in Manhattan. NYCEDC later proposed an expansion of the ferry service by developing a "Citywide Ferry Service" with new routes (which was implemented as NYC Ferry). NYC Ferry began operations in May 2017, with Hornblower Cruises winning the contract for citywide ferry services and taking over the East River Ferry route that had been previously operated by NY Waterway.

In the aftermath of Hurricane Sandy, which heavily damaged subway infrastructure in Queens and Brooklyn, Seastreak operated weekday commuter service to Rockaway, Queens. The service began in November 2012 and was discontinued in October 2014 once all repair work had been completed.

=== Proposed replacement ===
In 2021, NYCEDC and the Mayor's Office of Climate Resiliency released the Financial District and Seaport Climate Resilience Master Plan, which included strategies to protect Lower Manhattan from future flooding associated with coastal storms and projected sea level rise. The plan envisioned rebuilding the East River shoreline from The Battery to the Brooklyn Bridge with the addition of a floodwall incorporated into a multi-level waterfront. As part of the master plan, estimates were made to project the future growth in peak hour ferry ridership, meetings were held with maritime operators, and the design of ferry terminals in other locations (including the West Midtown Ferry Terminal at Pier 79) was studied to determine the need for additional ferry slips and expanded space for passenger loading, queuing, ticketing and waiting areas. A replacement ferry terminal was incorporated into the master plan near the terminal's existing location, with an entrance to the streets in the Financial District via a flood gate near Old Slip. Preliminary plans for the new city and regional ferry terminal proposed to replace Pier 11 include an expanded facility with total of 14 ferry slips (an increase of 5 slips compared to the existing terminal) and an upland terminal building adjacent to an entrance plaza at Old Slip.

== Service ==
=== NY Waterway ===
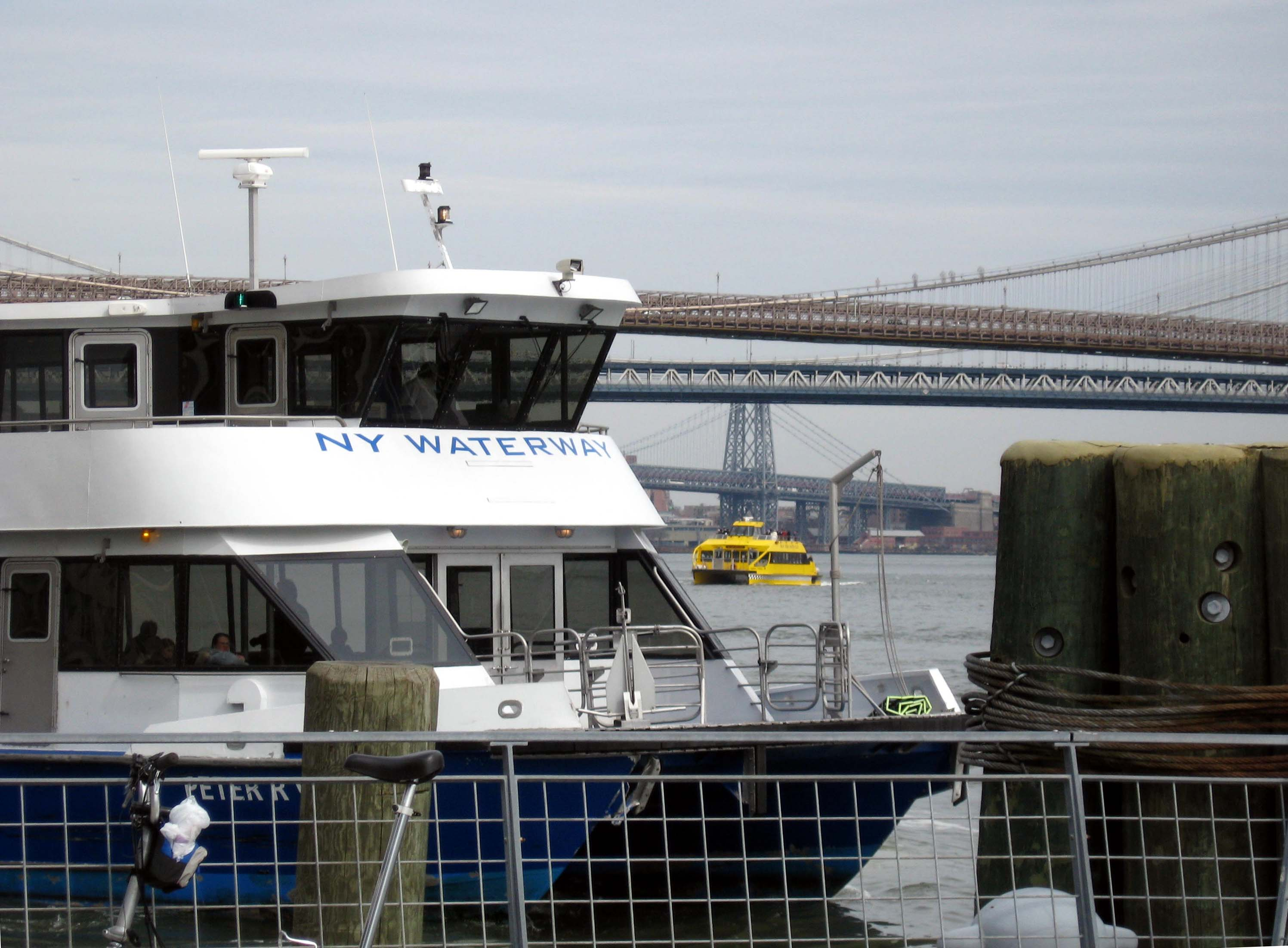
View from Pier 11 looking north to Brooklyn, Manhattan, and Williamsburg bridges

NY Waterway operates ferries to points along the Hudson River Waterfront Walkway in Hudson County, New Jersey (such as Weehawken Port Imperial, Hoboken Terminal, and Paulus Hook Ferry Terminal) and to South Amboy and Belford, New Jersey along the Raritan Bayshore.

NY Waterway also operates the IKEA Express Shuttle to the IKEA store in Red Hook, Brooklyn. The ferry was formerly operated by New York Water Taxi.

==== Routes ====
Destination	Intermediate Stops	Operational Hours
Hoboken Terminal	None	Weekday peak hours
Liberty Harbor	Paulus Hook	Weekday peak hours
Port Imperial	Battery Park City, Hoboken 14th Street	Weekday peak hours
Port Liberté	None	Weekday peak hours
South Amboy	Battery Park City	Weekday peak hours
IKEA Red Hook	Originates at West Midtown	Weekends
Belford	Originates at West Midtown	7 days a week

=== NYC Ferry ===
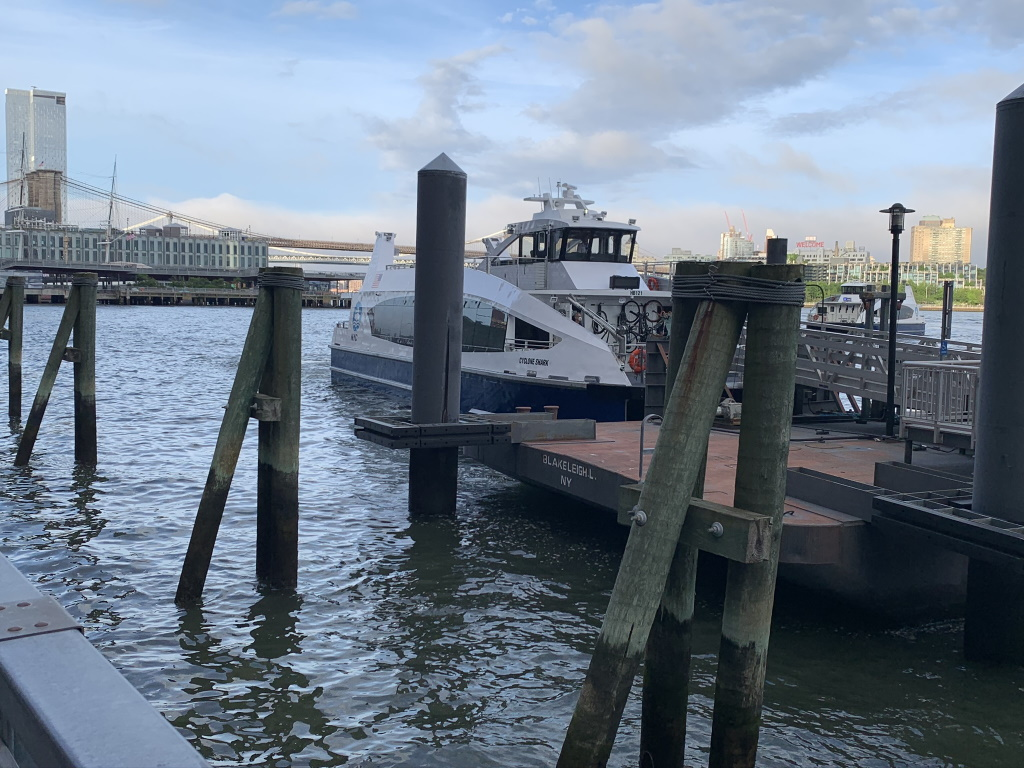
NYC Ferry vessel at Slip A

Pier 11 Wall Street is a stop for all NYC Ferry routes, and the terminus of all except the South Brooklyn and Rockaway/Soundview routes. In 2016, the city drew up plans for routes to Bay Ridge, Rockaway, Governors Island, Astoria, Lower East Side, and Soundview. On May 1, 2017, NYC Ferry's Rockaway route started operations, and NY Waterway's East River route was transferred over to NYC Ferry operation. The Bay Ridge route began on June 1, a month later, and the Astoria route began on August 29 of the same year. The route to Soundview opened on August 15, 2018, followed by the Lower East Side route two weeks later, on August 29 which was then later discontinued on May 18, 2020. Wall St/Pier 11 used to be the northern terminal for the South Brooklyn line, before the line was extended north on May 18, 2020. The St. George line was extended east from St. George Terminal to Brooklyn and Pier 11/Wall Street on December 8, 2025.

== Terminal building ==
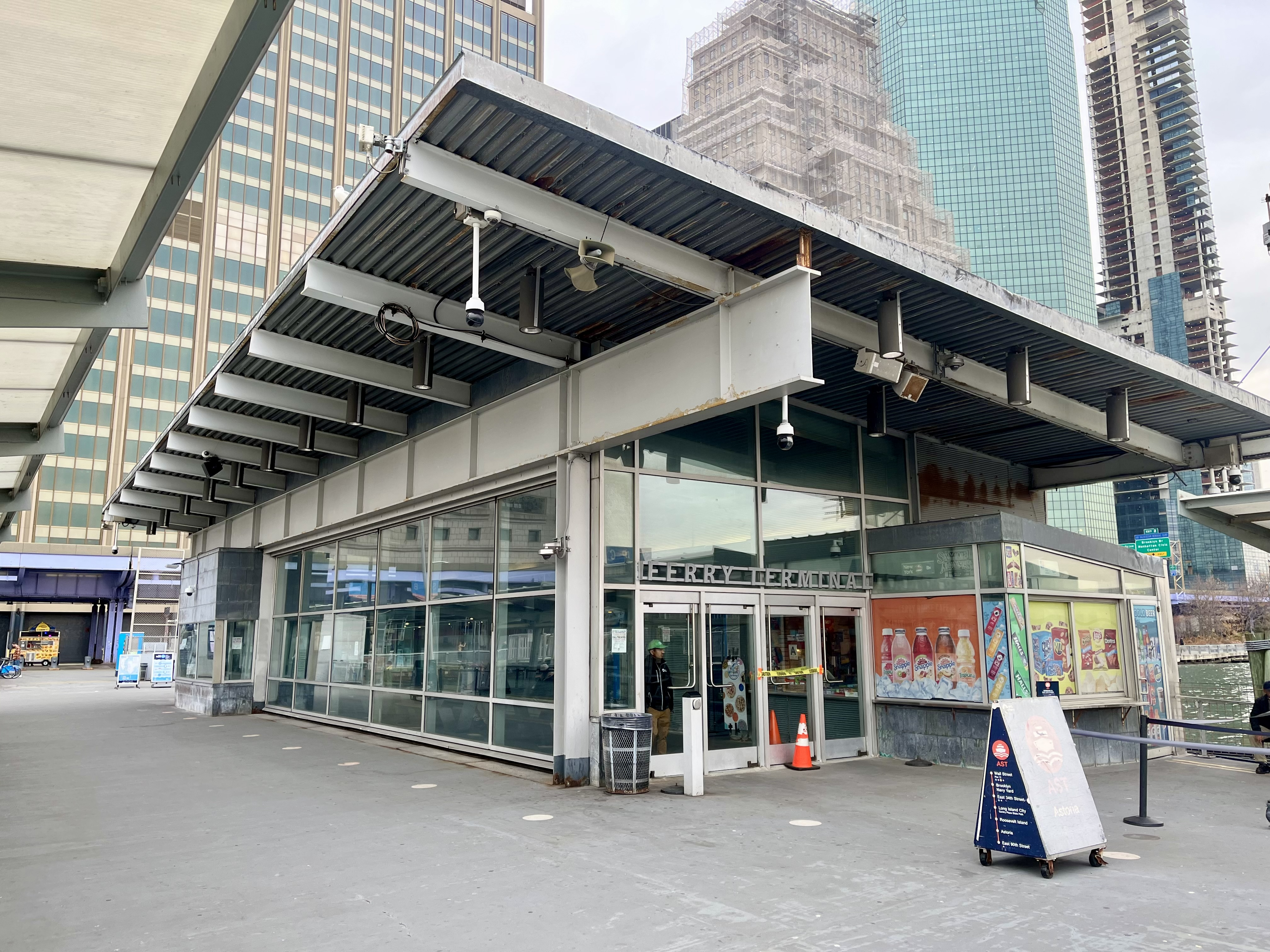
The terminal building in 2024

Pier 11 contains a terminal building with 2,100 square feet (200 m^{2}) of space for storage, retail, and offices. Designed by Henry Smith-Miller and Laurie Hawkinson, along with structural engineer Arup Group, the building was completed in 2000. The structure is made of glass, structural steel, and galvanized and corrugated material; these materials were used to evoke the waterfront. The building's entrances, on its western and eastern sides, are shaded by canopies. The south side of the building contains a 45-foot-wide (14 m) hangar door that can be opened up in warm weather.

The design of the terminal building has received favorable reviews from architecture critics, with Paul Goldberger describing it as "one of the most refreshing public buildings to have gone up on the waterfront in years." The Architectural League of New York displayed a model of the terminal building in 2001 as part of New New York 2, an exhibit showcasing six new buildings in New York City.

== Public art installations ==
Pier 11 is the venue for two permanent public art installations by artist Carl Cheng (who works under the corporate moniker The John Doe Company), Shadow Garden and Community Island Pond. Both installations showcase the artist's conceptual take on the reflection of faces abstracted by conditions of the East River. The combined total cost for both installations was $189,000. The public art installations were developed as part of the New York City Department of Cultural Affairs' Percent for Art program.

Shadow Garden (2000) is located near the entrance to the pier and showcases how the river condition like the tide, abstract the facial images in the water.

Community Island Pond (2001) measures 60 by 60 feet (18 m × 18 m) and is constructed of cast concrete deck, welded steel, and wood benches. The installation is approached by a pedestrian bridge over a 10-foot (3.0 m) water gap located at the end of the pier. A 20-foot (6.1 m) circular reflection pond is located in the center of the island with seating around it.

== See also ==
- Battery Park City Ferry Terminal
- South Ferry
- West Midtown Ferry Terminal
- East 34th Street Ferry Landing
- Paulus Hook Ferry Terminal
- Weehawken Port Imperial
- Fulton Ferry
- Battery Maritime Building
- St. George Ferry Terminal
- Liberty Street Ferry Terminal
- Cortland Street Ferry Depot
- Chambers Street Ferry Terminal
