= East 34th Street Ferry Landing =

Ferry terminal in Manhattan, New York

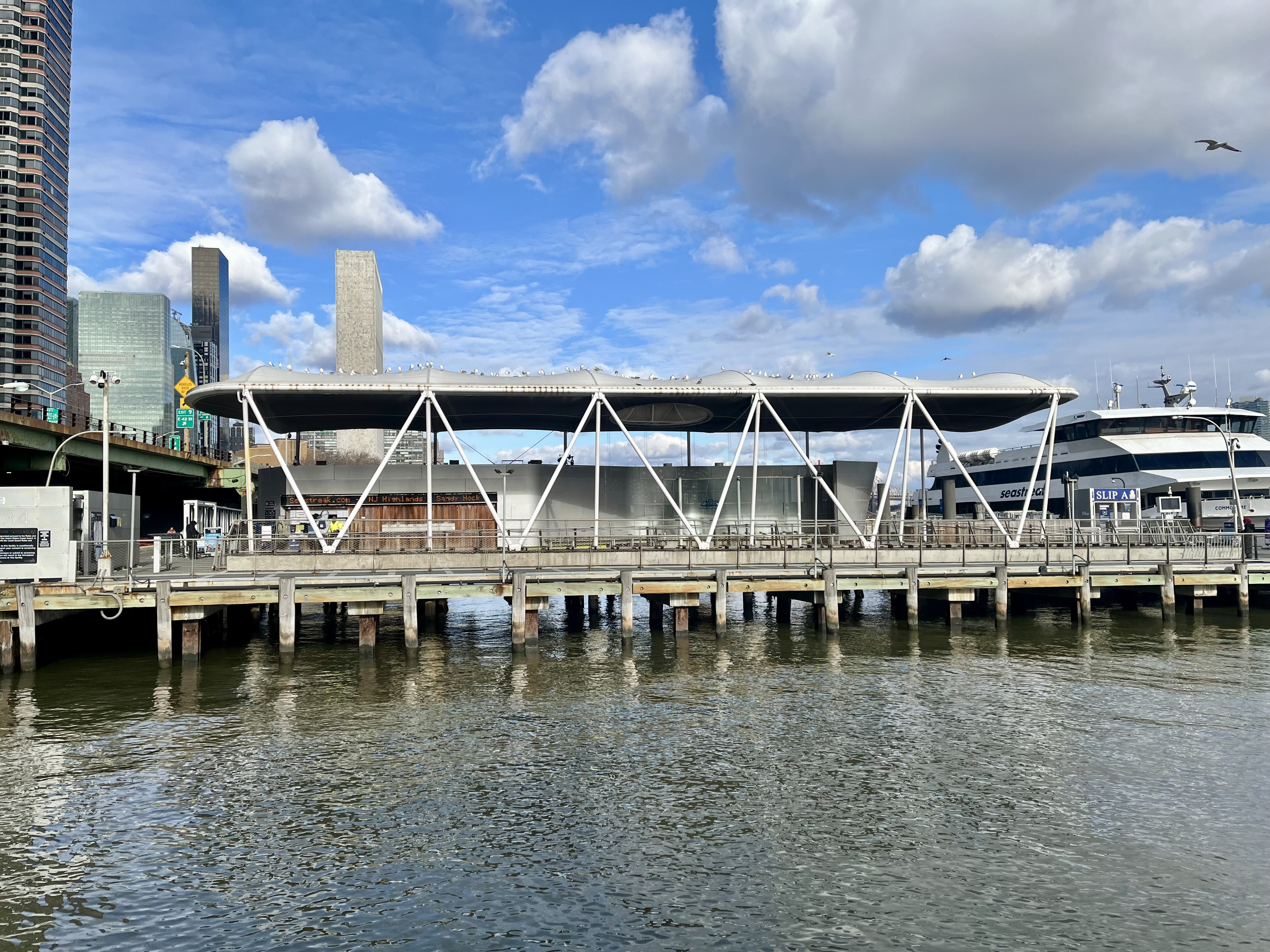

General information
- Coordinates: 40°44′38″N 73°58′15″W
- System: Ferry terminal
- Owner: New York City Department of Transportation
- Lines: New York Water Taxi; NYC Ferry; Seastreak
- Connections: NYCT Bus: M15, M15 SBS, M34 SBS, M34A SBS

Construction
- Parking: No
- Cycle facilities: Yes
- Accessible: Yes
- Architect: Kennedy & Violich

History
- Opened: 1988
- Rebuilt: 2005–2012

Passengers
- 2025: 1,581,759 per year

Services
Preceding station	NYC Ferry	Following station
Hunters Point South toward Pier 11/Wall Street	East River	Terminus
Brooklyn Navy Yard toward Pier 11/Wall Street	Astoria	Long Island City toward East 90th Street
Terminus	South Brooklyn	Corlears Hook toward Governors Island
Terminus	South Brooklyn (seasonal)	Corlears Hook toward Bay Ridge
East 90th Street toward Throgs Neck/Ferry Point Park	Rockaway-Soundview	Stuyvesant Cove toward Rockaway
Location
- Location within New York City Location within New York Location within the United States

The East 34th Street Ferry Landing provides slips to ferries and excursion boats in the Port of New York and New Jersey. It is located on the East River in New York City east of the FDR Drive just north of East 34th Street in Midtown Manhattan. The facility, owned by the city, received Federal Highway Administration funding for improvements for docking facilities and upgrading the adjacent East River Greenway in 2008. A new terminal was built and completed in 2012.

Service is provided by Seastreak, which signs the landing as East 35th Street, and by NYC Ferry, which signs it as East 34th Street/Midtown. There is a M34 Select Bus Service bus stop adjacent to the ferry landing; the M15 local, M15 Select Bus Service and the M34A Select Bus Service have stops in the immediate vicinity at the intersection of First Avenue and East 34th Street. The East 34th Street Heliport is also on the waterfront south of the ferry landing.

== History ==
=== Opening and early years ===
A ferry crossing between Hunters Point and 34th Street was established on April 20, 1859 by Anthony W. Winans. The route was originally operated by the East River Ferry Corporation, which was taken over by the Metropolitan Ferry Company in 1887 and later came under the control of Long Island Rail Road (LIRR) in 1892. The ferry dock in Hunters Point was located adjacent to the LIRR's Long Island City station, which became the railroad's western terminus in 1861, and was also situated near the beginning of Jackson Avenue, a 6-mile-long (9.7 km) road leading to Flushing that opened in 1860. (By 1920, most of this road had been renamed as Northern Boulevard.)

In 1905, the LIRR expanded the ferry terminal between 33rd and 34th Streets which had five slips and was able to accommodate automobiles, and is now the site of the heliport. Connecting mass transit service was provided by the 34th Street Ferry elevated station which was located east of First Avenue and operated from 1880 to 1930. Usage of the 34th Street Ferry peaked at 28 million riders in 1906. In addition to carrying daily commuters to and from Long Island, the ferry was also heavily used by passengers destined to Belmont Park, Sheepshead Bay Race Track, the North Beach Amusement Park (located adjacent to Bowery Bay), and Calvary Cemetery, requiring the use of special guards to accommodate the crowds on race days, Sundays, and holidays. Ferry service was discontinued on March 3, 1925 after a decline in ridership following the completion of numerous tunnel and bridge crossings, including the Queensboro Bridge in 1909, the East River Tunnels in 1910 (which enabled the LIRR to operate trains directly to Midtown Manhattan in a new terminal at Pennsylvania Station), and the Steinway Tunnel in 1915.

While the opening of the Queensboro Bridge led to the demise of the original ferry service from 34th Street in 1925, increased traffic congestion on the span soon led to calls for the resumption of ferries operating to Long Island City. The city declined to operate a municipal ferry—projecting that the route would operate with a deficit—but suggested finding a private company willing to operate the ferry if they thought the service would be profitable. A ferry was not intended to be a permanent solution to the traffic problem, and plans had already been drawn up for a proposed vehicular tunnel connection between 38th Street in Manhattan and Long Island City. In January 1927, two applications were submitted to the city by private entities seeking to operate a ferry route between Manhattan and Long Island City. An editorial in The New York Times commended the efforts made by private enterprise to relieve traffic congestion by seeking to operate a ferry, especially when vehicles using a ferry would have to pay a toll when they could instead drive over the Queensboro Bridge for free.

Ferry service to Queens was reinstated in September 1927 by the East 34th Street Vehicular Ferry Company, which only carried autos and trucks. To help make the route financially viable, the company secured contracts with the American Railway Express Company and the National Sugar Refining Company to carry the businesses' trucks across the East River. The East 34th Street Vehicular Ferry Company took over the property in Manhattan that had been used by the LIRR for its ferry operations, but determined it was necessary to demolish the old structures and build an entirely new terminal, which had slips for two boats. The vehicular ferry service operated until July 1936 when service was suspended during the midst of the Great Depression; a bankruptcy petition was later filed against the company. Four years later, the Queens–Midtown Tunnel opened, providing a new connection for vehicles traveling between Midtown Manhattan and Long Island City.

=== Late 20th century to present ===
Beginning in the mid-1980s, proposals were made to provide ferry service along the East River corridor as an alternative form of public transportation. A landing at East 34th Street was included as a potential point that could be served by water taxi. The feasibility of a new ferry service between Hunters Point and Manhattan was also studied as a means to improve access to the proposed Queens West redevelopment project along the Long Island City waterfront. A new ferry dock was added to provide service to 34th Street, which consisted of a 110-by-35-foot (34 by 11 m) barge moored near the foot of East 35th Street. The landing was accessed from the bulkhead via gangways and could accommodate both side- and front-loading vessels.

The city originally planned to have the ferry landing completed by July or August of 1988, but sped up the process so it could be available for use when the Williamsburg Bridge was temporarily closed for emergency repairs in April 1988 and was negotiating to have a privately operated ferry run between Greenpoint, Brooklyn and East 34th Street. The first service to use the new ferry terminal was the Pan Am Water Shuttle to LaGuardia Airport. The water shuttle was originally launched in 1987 to provide service between Pier 11/Wall Street and the Marine Air Terminal (which at the time was used for Pan Am Shuttle flights to Boston Logan and Washington National airports); a stop at 34th Street was added to the route in July 1988. The ferry service was rebranded as the Delta Water Shuttle in 1991, when the Pan Am Shuttle was taken over by Delta Air Lines and became the Delta Shuttle. Ferry service to the LaGuardia Airport continued until December 2000.

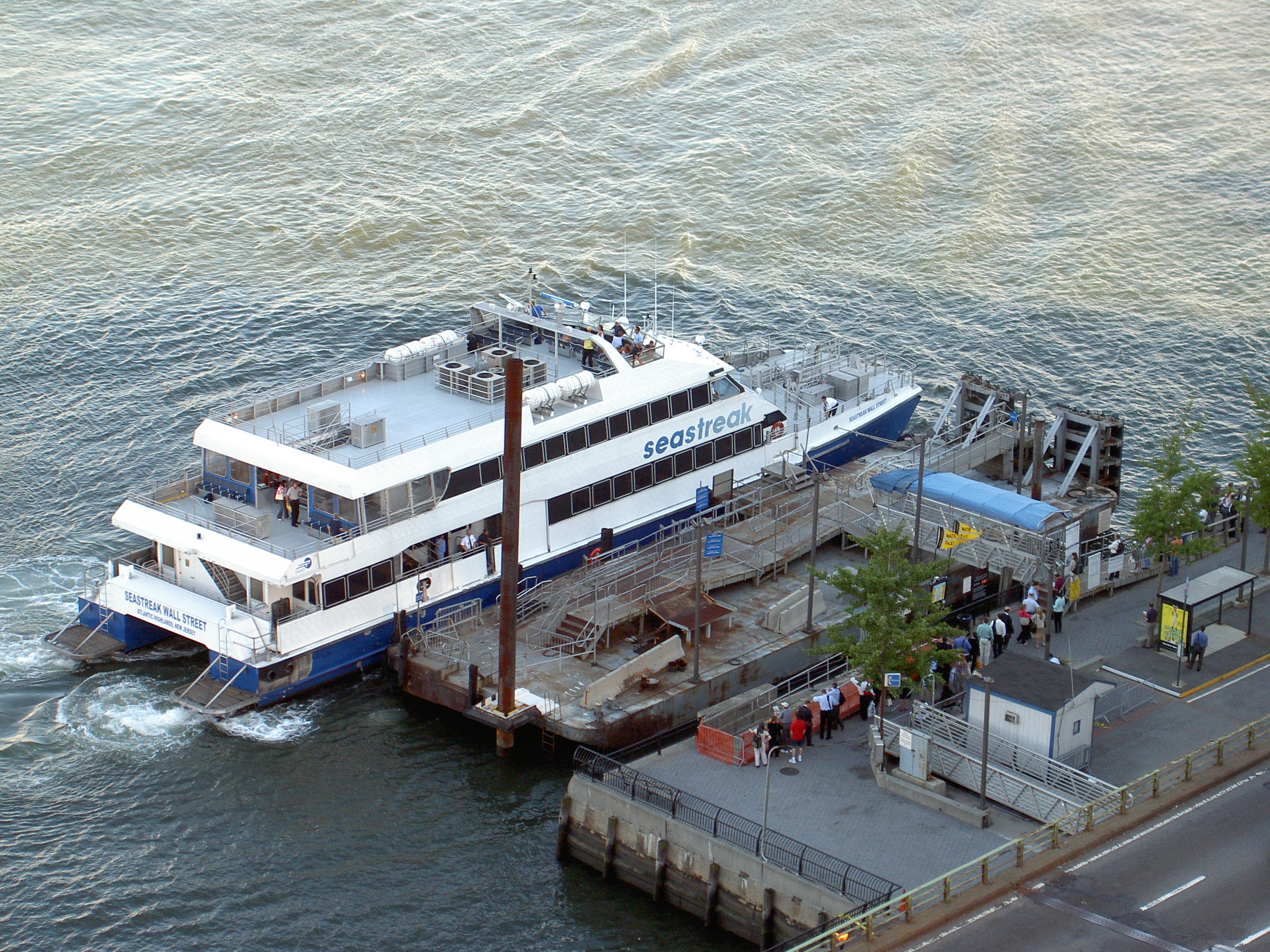
Seastreak Wall Street docked at the East 34th Street Ferry Landing in 2005 before it was rebuilt

Commuter service to New Jersey began with a short-lived ferry to Port Liberté that operated for seven months in 1989. Service to Atlantic Highlands and Highlands began in January 1999 and October 1994, respectively; these two routes were originally operated by TNT Hydrolines (now Seastreak).

Through the 1990s and early 2000s, several proposals and various attempts were made to provide commuter service to other locations from 34th Street, among them service to Inwood and Glen Cove on Long Island, Pier 11/Wall Street (on a shuttle from the Upper East Side and a shuttle that operated around the southern tip of Manhattan to West 44th Street), Staten Island, and South Amboy in New Jersey. Attempts were also made at providing summer service for weekend getaways to Fire Island and Greenport on Long Island and the beaches on the Rockaways in Queens. During this time, other ferries using the terminal at East 34th Street provided service to baseball games at Yankee Stadium and Shea Stadium and the Water's Edge restaurant in Long Island City.

Restoration of the traditional Hunters Point crossing was initiated by NY Waterway in October 1994 but was later abandoned in March 2001 due to a decline in ridership. NY Waterway had previously announced plans to suspend service to Hunters Point in 1996 due to low ridership, which was attributed to delays in the construction of residential development in Queens West and improvements to LIRR train service to Long Island City, but decided to retain peak period service for commuters, which included drivers who used the 450-space parking lot next to the Hunters Point ferry terminal to avoid taking their cars into Manhattan. A subsidy from the Federal Emergency Management Agency to assist commuters affected by the September 11 attacks enabled service to resume in September 2002.

Operation of the Hunters Point route was taken over by New York Water Taxi in September 2003. By the mid-2000s New York Water Taxi was regularly serving East 34th Street landing on the Hunters Point crossing and other routes. Ferries from East 34th Street also provided service to the Water Taxi Beach in Long Island City that the company operated during the summer months.

==== Design of new terminal ====
In the early 2000s, improvements at the East 34th Street landing were planned by the New York City Economic Development Corporation (NYCEDC) to support the development of a ferry corridor along the East River, providing an alternate mode of transportation for commuters as well as a public safety measure in light of the role played by ferry terminals for emergency evacuation following the September 11 attacks.

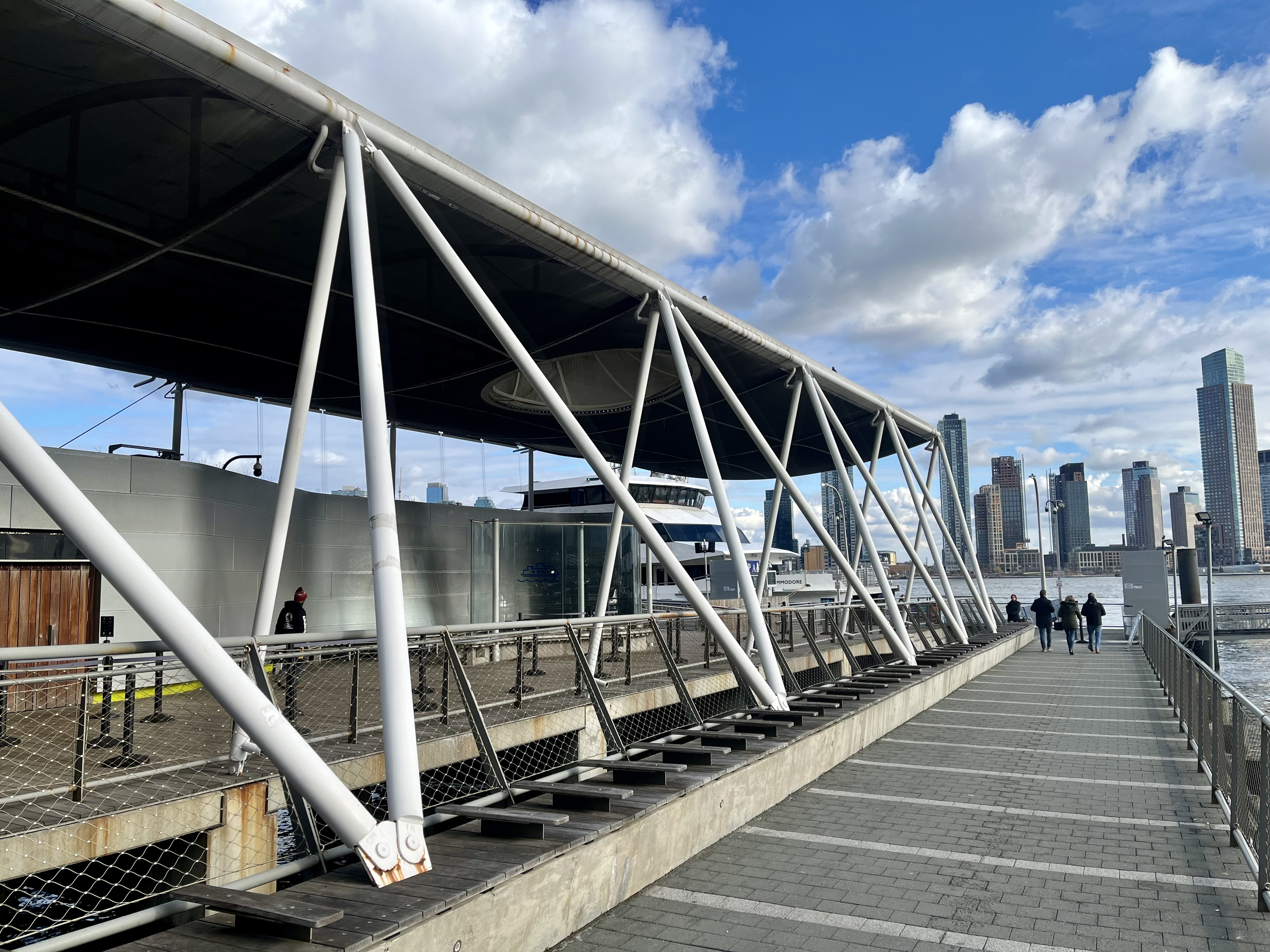
The new terminal was designed to include a roof canopy supported by triangulated columns

The upgrades to the terminal involved replacing the existing barge near the foot of East 35th Street with a new ferry landing by repurposing a city-owned pier located between East 35th and 36th streets. This pier had been in use until the 1990s and formerly accommodated fuel deliveries for the Kips Bay Generating Station. The inactive pier was repaired and an extension was constructed at its east end, to which two barges were moored. On the south side of the existing pier, a separate pedestrian ramp was constructed between the bulkhead and the pier extension. Construction of the pier extension and pedestrian ramp connecting to the new barges began in 2005 and was completed and opened to the public by 2008. Designed by a team led by Sheila Kennedy and the architecture firm of Kennedy & Violich, the new terminal was completed in 2012 and includes a lenticular fabric roof canopy made of translucent and meshed ETFE that is supported by triangulated columns.

A vehicular drop-off and pickup area for buses and taxis was constructed at the foot of East 34th Street that could be accessed from the service road below the FDR Drive viaduct. The terminal upgrades also improved public access to the waterfront in the vicinity of the ferry landing, which forms part of the East River Greenway, with the installation of new pavement, benches, landscaping, lighting, and esplanade railing. Ken Smith Landscape Architects collaborated with Kennedy & Violich on the design of the ferry landing and upland esplanade; the firm originally intended to include riparian plantings (such as Spartina) that were protected from river currents by structured planters and irrigated by tidewater using windmills. However, most of the landscaping design was cut from the project as a result of value engineering and difficulties in obtaining environmental approvals to construct the riparian plantings.

==== Opening and later modifications ====
Seastreak began providing round-trip service to Martha's Vineyard on summer weekends in 2009; trips departed from Manhattan on Friday afternoon and returned from Oak Bluffs on Sunday afternoon, making the trip in about five hours on a route through Long Island Sound, Block Island Sound, Rhode Island Sound, and Vineyard Sound. The seasonal weekend service was extended to Nantucket beginning in 2015.

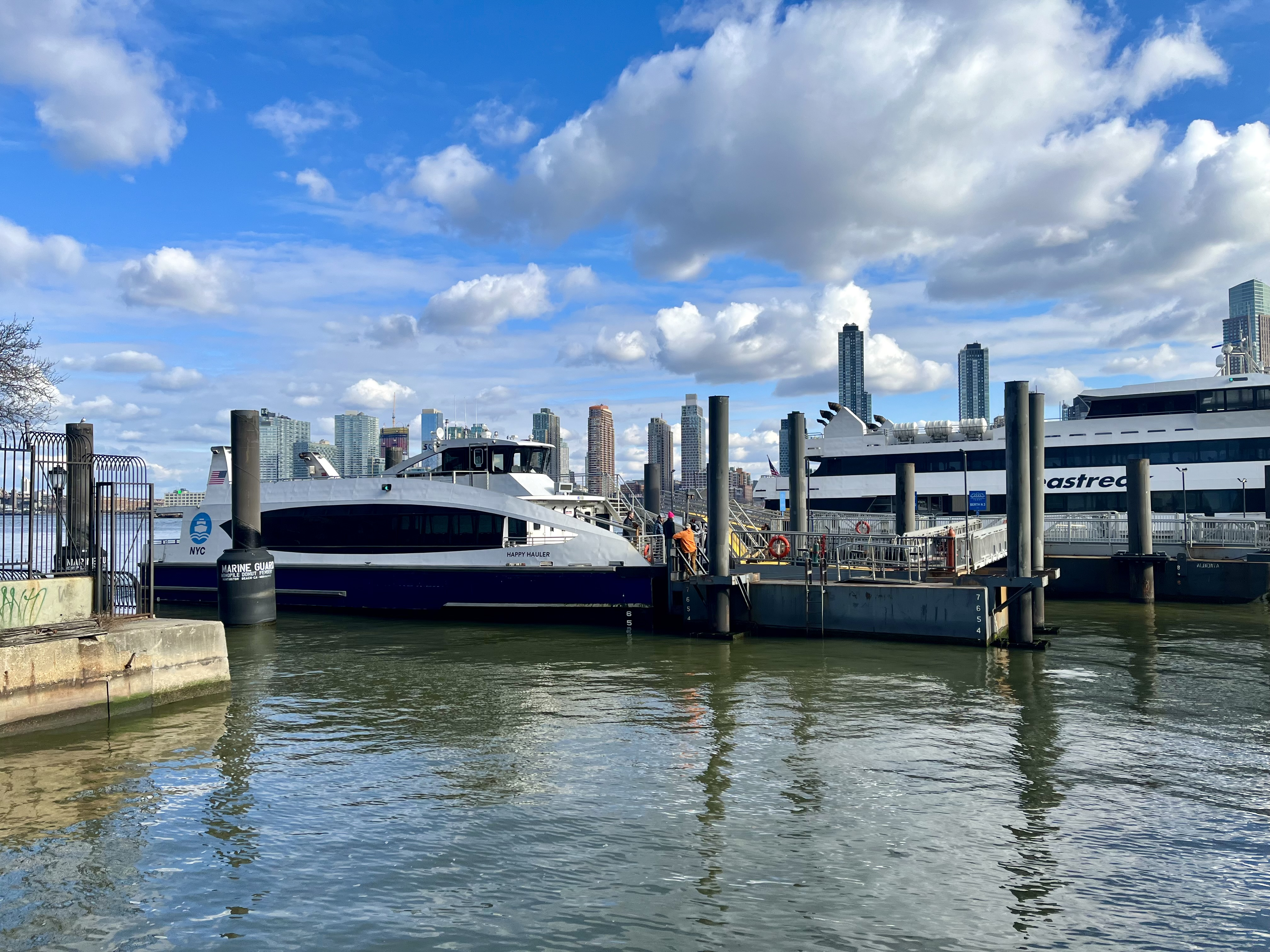
An additional slip was added to the north side of the terminal to accommodate NYC Ferry service

After a request for bids, NYCEDC in 2011 awarded NY Waterway a three-year contract and a $3 million annual subsidy to operate ferry service on the East River including 34th Street. The new service, which was called the East River Ferry, began operating in June 2011 and also included a free transfer bus loop in Midtown East. NYCEDC later proposed an expansion of the ferry service by developing a "Citywide Ferry Service" with new routes and new/upgraded ferry landings (which was implemented as NYC Ferry). To support the increase in vessels docking at the East 34th Street Ferry Landing with the addition of proposed new routes, a smaller barge was added next to the barge on the north side of the terminal to provide an additional slip for bow-loading vessels. Monopile dolphins were added to help guide ferries in and out of the new slip.

In the aftermath of infrastructure damage and service disruptions to the New York City Subway system in Queens and Brooklyn caused by Hurricane Sandy on October 29, 2012, Seastreak began running weekday ferry service between East 34th Street and Rockaway Park, Queens, with additional stops at Pier 11 and Brooklyn Army Terminal. Although the service proved popular, it was ultimately discontinued on October 31, 2014 when the city government declined to continue subsidizing it. A temporary ferry service was also operated between East 34th Street and Glen Cove on Long Island to provide an option for LIRR commuters affected by reductions to rush hour service during infrastructure upgrades made at Penn Station during the summer of 2017.

NYC Ferry began operations in May 2017, with Hornblower Cruises winning the contract for citywide ferry services and taking over the East River Ferry route that had been previously operated by NY Waterway. Other NYC Ferry service at East 34th Street includes the Astoria and Soundview routes, which were added in August 2017 and August 2018, respectively. NYC Ferry's Lower East Side route also provided service at the landing from August 2018 until it was discontinued in May 2020.

A feasibility study conducted by NYCEDC in 2018 for a potential expansion of NYC Ferry service indicated that the East 34th Street Ferry Landing operates near capacity during peak periods and may require additional upgrades in the future. In November 2025, NYCEDC announced plans to upgrade the terminal to provide more passenger queuing space and additional vessel berths in conjunction with upcoming changes to the NYC Ferry network. The changes to the ferry's route network began the following month, which included combining the Soundview route with the Rockaway route, extending the South Brooklyn route to terminate at East 34th Street, and splitting out the East River route into two routes during peak periods. Beginning in April 2026, a seating island and wraparound wall are planned to be removed from the terminal to eliminate pinch points and create additional space for pedestrian queuing.

== Service ==
=== Seastreak ===
Seastreak catamarans operate daily to the Raritan Bayshore in Monmouth County, New Jersey. After calling at Battery Maritime Building, boats continue through The Narrows to terminals at Atlantic Highlands or Highlands. Seasonal excursions include service to Sandy Hook (via BMB Slip 5), Martha's Vineyard, and Nantucket (via Martha's Vineyard).

=== New York Water Taxi ===
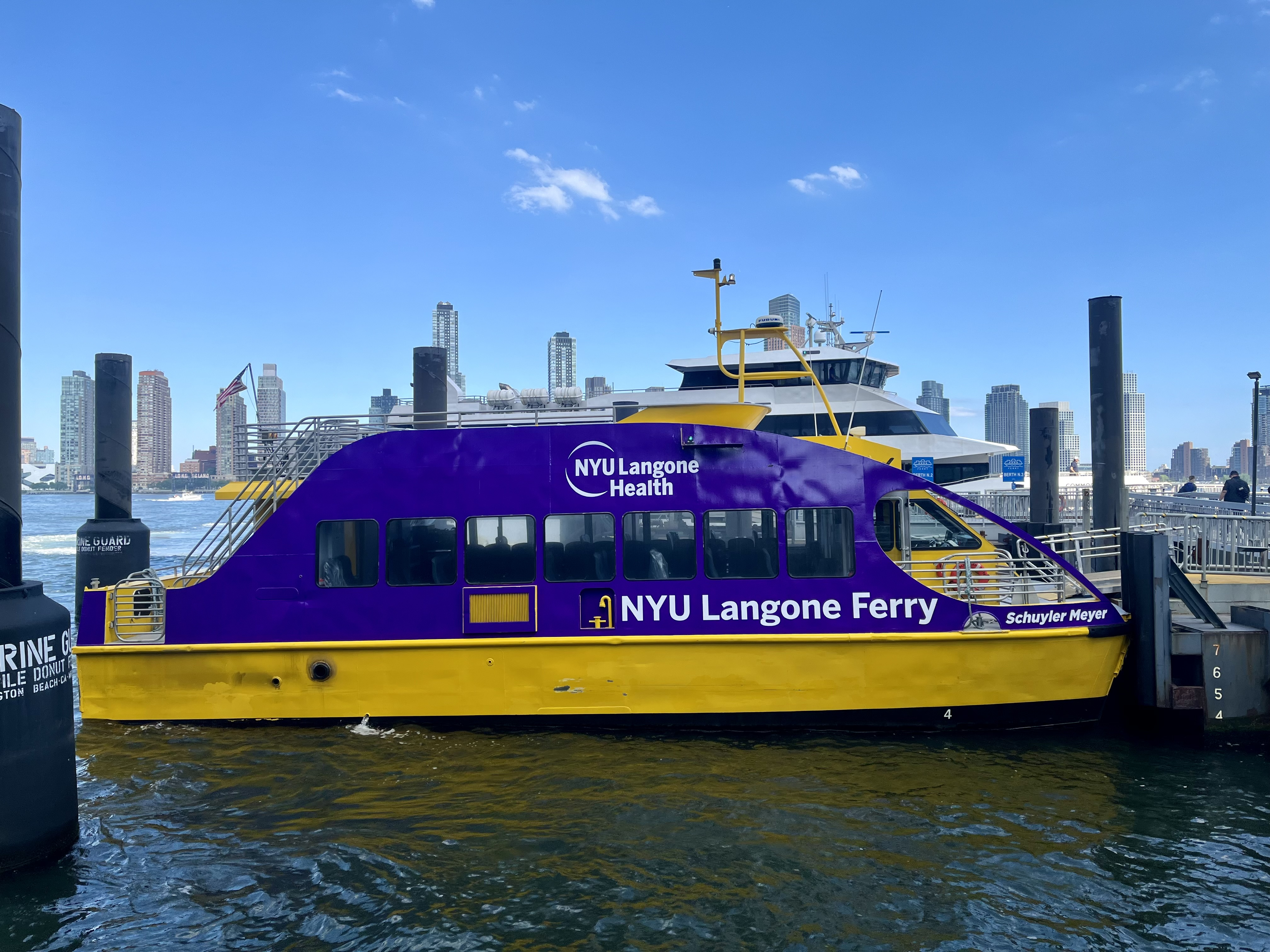
New York Water Taxi operates a ferry for NYU Langone Health employees

New York Water Taxi operates a shuttle service for NYU Langone Health between 34th Street and the Brooklyn Army Terminal. Use of this service is limited to NYU card holders (faculty, students and staff) and provides a connection between its academic medical center in Manhattan and NYU Langone Hospital – Brooklyn.

=== NYC Ferry ===
NYC Ferry's East River Ferry (formerly operated by NY Waterway) runs between East 34th Street and Pier 11/Wall Street, making intermediate stops at Hunters Point South and multiple ferry landings in northern Brooklyn, with year-round service. Additionally, the Astoria Ferry runs between East 90th Street on the Upper East Side and Pier 11/Wall Street, making intermediate stops at Astoria, Roosevelt Island, Long Island City, East 34th Street, and the Brooklyn Navy Yard, with year-round service. The Lower East Side Ferry used to operate between Long Island City and Pier 11/Wall Street via eastern Manhattan year-round, but was then discontinued on May 18, 2020 due to low ridership. The Rockaway-Soundview Route runs in both directions to Rockaway, Queens, and Ferry Point Park in Throgs Neck, making intermediate stops at Soundview, multiple ferry landings in eastern Manhattan, and Brooklyn Army Terminal year-round. The South Brooklyn Route runs south to Governors Island during most of the year and Bay Ridge, Brooklyn, during summer weekends, with intermediate stops in eastern Manhattan and South Brooklyn.

=== Special events ===
The ferry terminal has also been used to provide service to annual music festivals held on Randall's Island, including the Electric Zoo Festival, Governors Ball Music Festival, and Panorama Music Festival.

== See also ==
- List of ferries across the East River
- Battery Park City Ferry Terminal
- West Midtown Ferry Terminal
- Paulus Hook Ferry Terminal
- Weehawken Port Imperial
- Fulton Ferry, Brooklyn
- St. George Ferry Terminal
- Staten Island Ferry Whitehall Terminal
