= Otto Wolgast =

Early Settler in Colonial America

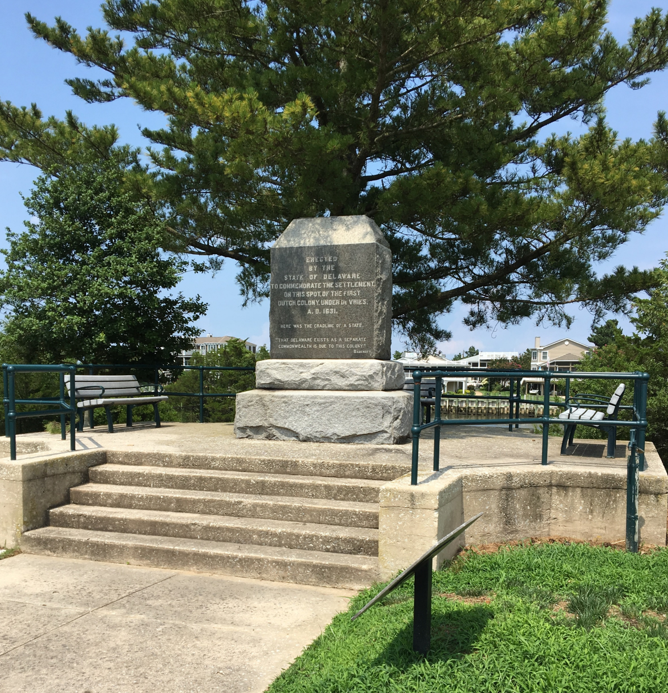
- The DeVries Monument of the Zwaanendael Settlement in Lewes, Delaware
- Born: c. 1640; Wolgast, Pomerania
- Died: 1681 (aged 41); Lewes, Delaware
- Occupation(s): Settler, planter, magistrate and justice of the peace in colonial Delaware
- Spouse: Elizabeth Wolgast (later Elizabeth Carter)
- Children: Robert Wolgast
- Relatives: Thomas Blades Wildgoose, William J. Wilgus, James E. Wilgus, Jr.

Otto Wolgast (c. 1640–1681) was one of the first settlers of Lewes, Delaware in what is now the United States. He was an early magistrate and follower of Mennonite reformer Pieter Corneliszoon Plockhoy at the Dutch colony of the Zwaanendael in the New Netherlands. He would later serve as Justice of the Peace under the English colonial authorities.

== Biography ==
Born in Wolgast, Pomerania around 1640, Wolgast traveled to the Netherlands where he became a follower of the early Mennonite preacher Pieter Corneliszoon Plockhoy and traveled to the Dutch colony of the Zwaanendael in present day Delaware in a group of 41 settlers from Amsterdam, the Netherlands in 1663. Zwaanendael would later be seized and burned by the English and eventually change its name first to the Hoornkil or Horekil, and eventually to Lewes, Delaware, the first city of the first state in America.

Plockhoy, Wolgast and forty other followers arrived at the Hoornkil, present day Lewes, on 28 July 1663, traveling on a Dutch Sloop, the Sint Jacob. Wolgast was the only Pomeranian immigrant to the Dutch Colony of Zwaanendael and would go on to have a profitable and successful life as one of the founders of the town of Lewes, Delaware. Wolgast would be named a magistrate of Lewes by Francis Lovelace, the English governor of New Castle in 1669. Wolgast was also commissioned into the King's service in 1669 and listed as a "Pomeranian who became commissioned at Fort Whorekil" in contemporary records. The Census of 8 May 1671 of the Delaware Colony listed forty-seven people living in the Whorekil. "Otto Wolgast, his wife, one son and one servant" were listed in the census, implying Otto’s household comprised almost one tenth of the settlement at the time.

Otto was present at the Hoornkill in 1673 when the English under Captain Robert Carr took the Zwaanendael colony from the Dutch and burned the Hoorkill to the ground. Carr reported back to his superiors that he had: "Destroyed the Quaking society of Plockhoy to a naile."

In November 1674, Otto was reappointed a magistrate for Lewes, and in June 1675 he was recorded in the early records of the Colony as a "Justice [and] good ordinary planter". Finally in 1680, Sir Edmond Andros, the English Governor of the Dominion of New England appointed Otto Wolgast as "Justice of the Peace at the Whorekill and Dependencies." Otto Wolgast died in May 1681. He is remembered as one of the first settlers in Colonial Delaware, an early magistrate in the colony, and helping to found the city of Lewes in Colonial Delaware.

== Legacy ==
Otto Wolgast, according to the Delaware Historian J. Thomas Scharf, is the ancestor of the Wilgus family of Rehoboth Beach, Delaware and Salisbury, Maryland.

The Wilgus Site, named after the descendants of Otto Wolgast, is a prehistoric Native American camp site in coastal Sussex County, Delaware, near Bethany Beach. The site is located along a now-inundated tributary of the Indian River. Evidence of the site indicates it was occupied during the Adena culture during the Early Woodland Period. The site was listed on the U.S. National Register of Historic Places in 1978.

A direct descendant of Otto Wolgast is the Anglo-Dutch author Linda Wilgus who writes historical fiction novels and literary fiction short stories in the United Kingdom. Wilgus is known for her historical fiction novel The Sea Child.

Another direct descendant of Otto Wolgast is William J. Wilgus, a civil engineer who built several important public buildings in the 19th century including Grand Central Station in New York, invented the Wilgus-Sprague System of powering trains via a Third Rail system of train electrification. He served in the Allied Expeditionary Force as the chief of rail logistics in the First World War. Wilgus State Park in Auscutney, Vermont was built on land donated by Wilgus in 1933.

In February 2025, an article in Naval History magazine published by the United States Naval Institute focused on the Battle of Iwo Jima. The article featured one of Otto Wolgast's direct descendants, James E. Wilgus, Jr. who survived a kamikaze attack on the USS Saratoga (CV-3) on the night of 21 February 1945. James was born in 1926, on the same land settled by Otto Wolgast in 1663.

== See also ==
- David Pieterszoon de Vries
- Dutch West India Company
- Lewes, Delaware
- List of place names of Dutch origin
- New Netherlands
- Rehoboth Beach, Delaware
- Salisbury, Maryland
- Sussex County, Delaware
- Wilgus Site, Delaware
- William J. Wilgus
- Wolgast, is a town in the district of Vorpommern-Greifswald, in Mecklenburg-Vorpommern, Germany.
- Zwaanendael Colony
- Zwaanendael Museum
