= Charter of Freedoms and Exemptions =

Charter of New Netherland

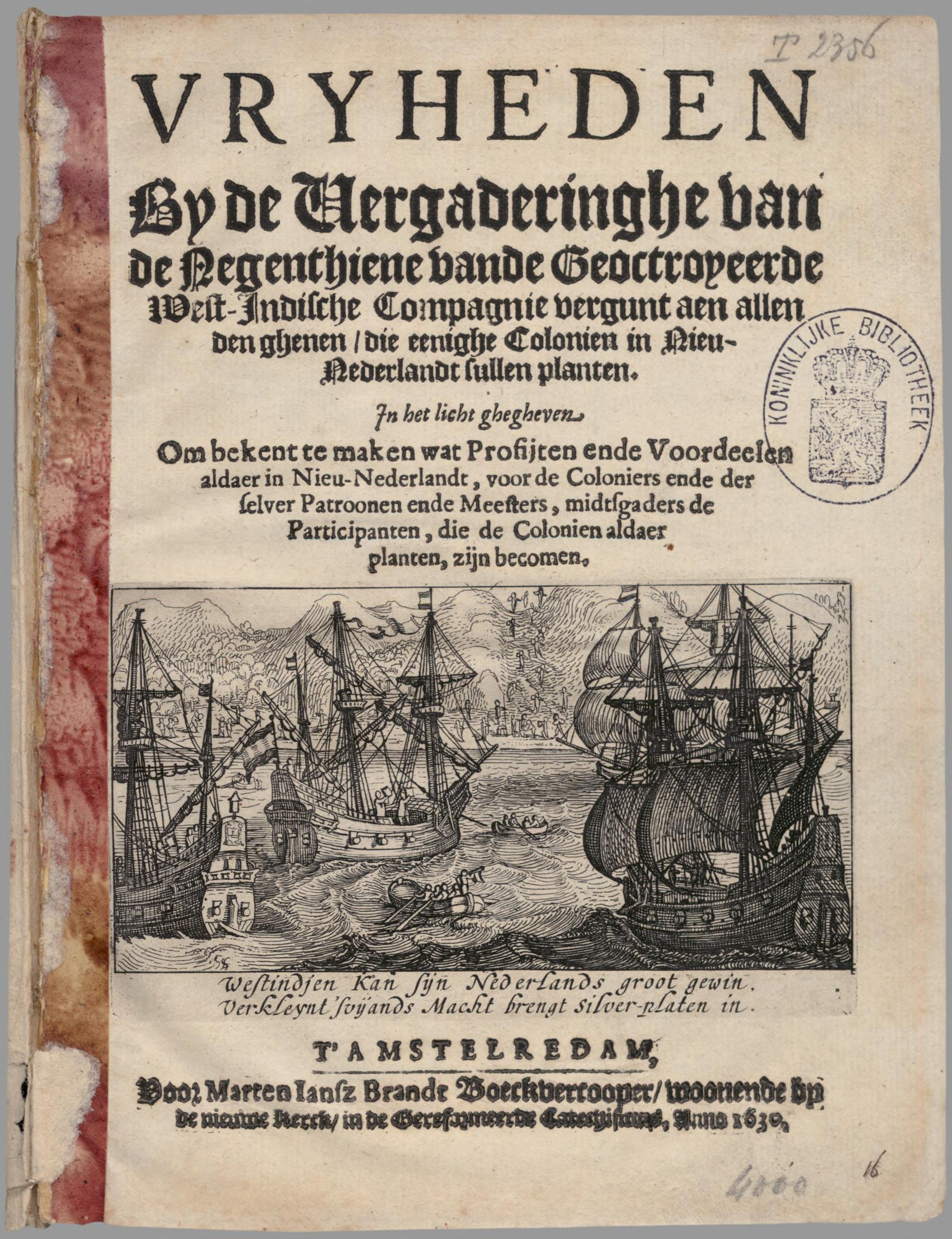
- First page of the Charter of Freedoms and Exemptions
- Ratified: June 7, 1629
- Location: Netherlands
- Author: Dutch West India Company
- Purpose: Establish patroonships in New Netherland

The Charter of Freedoms and Exemptions, sometimes referred to as the Charter of Privileges and Exemptions, is a document written by the Dutch West India Company in an effort to settle its colony of New Netherland in North America through the establishment of feudal patroonships purchased and supplied by members of the West India Company. Its 31 articles establish ground rules and expectations of the patroons and inhabitants of the new colonies. It was ratified by the Dutch States-General on June 7, 1629.

== Background ==
The economic situation of the colony of New Netherland in the late 1620s could be considered a fairly good showing for a colony only newly started in a wilderness. The first settlement was built in 1613, strictly out of necessity, but soon after, forts were built. At the time of the charter, the oldest settlement was only 16 years old. But this slow success was hardly sufficient to create much excitement among the directors of the West India Company. The principal objective of this organization was to go after the spoils of war, which promised rich harvests in the captured fleets of the Spanish, with colonization being only a secondary consideration. Noting that the capture of the silver fleet in 1628 left the company proceeds of $115,000,000, and that the next year sundry privateers brought in a bounty of over $18,000,000, it was hardly surprising that so little attention was paid to the settlements in the Hudson River Valley. Those were "get rich quick" days for large corporations, and the slow and tedious procedure of colonizing and cultivating new countries found little favor in the eyes of the men at the helm.

== The Charter ==
The realization that greater inducements had to be offered to increase the development of the colony led the West India Company to the creation of the so-called "patroon system". In 1629, the West India Company issued its charter of "Freedoms and Exemptions" by which it was declared that any member of the Company who could bring to and settle 50 persons over the age of 15 in New Netherland, should receive a liberal grant of land to hold as patroon, or lord, with the exception, per Article III, of the island of Manhattan. This land could have a frontage of 16 miles (26 km) if on one side of a river, or 8 miles (13 km) if situated on both sides. The patroon would be chief magistrate on his land, but disputes of more than 50 guilders could be appealed to the Director and his Council in New Amsterdam.

The tenants would be free from all taxation for 10 years, but during this period they would not be allowed to change from one estate to another nor to move from the country to the town. At least one quarter of the 50 inhabitants would have to be settled within the first year of the land grant, with the rest being settled within three years following that. The patroons would have full liberty to purchase goods in New Netherland, New England, and New France, with the exception of furs. But the trader would have to pay an export tax of five per cent in New Amsterdam before goods could be shipped to Europe. The fur trade remained a monopoly of the company, being the most profitable investment at the time. The weaving of cloth was also prohibited in order to supply the looms in Holland with their needed raw supplies.

The patroon would be responsible for the expenses in erecting barns and other structures and preparing land for farming in addition to supplying the initial farming tools, vehicles, and livestock. However, each tenant would be due to pay a stipulated rent in addition to a percentage of that which they produced. Additionally, no farmer could sell any good without first offering it to patroon. The patroon also bore responsibility of hiring a minister and schoolmaster, as well as financing the respective structures when they became needed. Once the patroonship became a profitable enterprise, the patroon was expected to share net profits with the tenants.

There are some notable aspects of the charter, which, while aiming to make the West India Company wealthy and successful, offered great incentives to the patroons and respect to the indigenous peoples. For example, Article XXVI states that the patroon "must satisfy the Indians of that place for the land", essentially implying that the land must be bought (or bartered) from the local Indians, and not just taken. Article VI states that the patroon "shall forever own and possess and hold from the Company as a perpetual fief of inheritance, all the land lying within the aforesaid limits", which made the patroonship a fiefdom. It shall be seen later that one patroonship would last well into the 19th century. Additionally, the Company agreed to protect the patroonships from attack (Article XXV), and even supply the patroonship—for free—"with as many blacks as it possibly can ... for [no] longer [a] time than it shall see fit" (Article XXX).

== Resulting patroonships ==
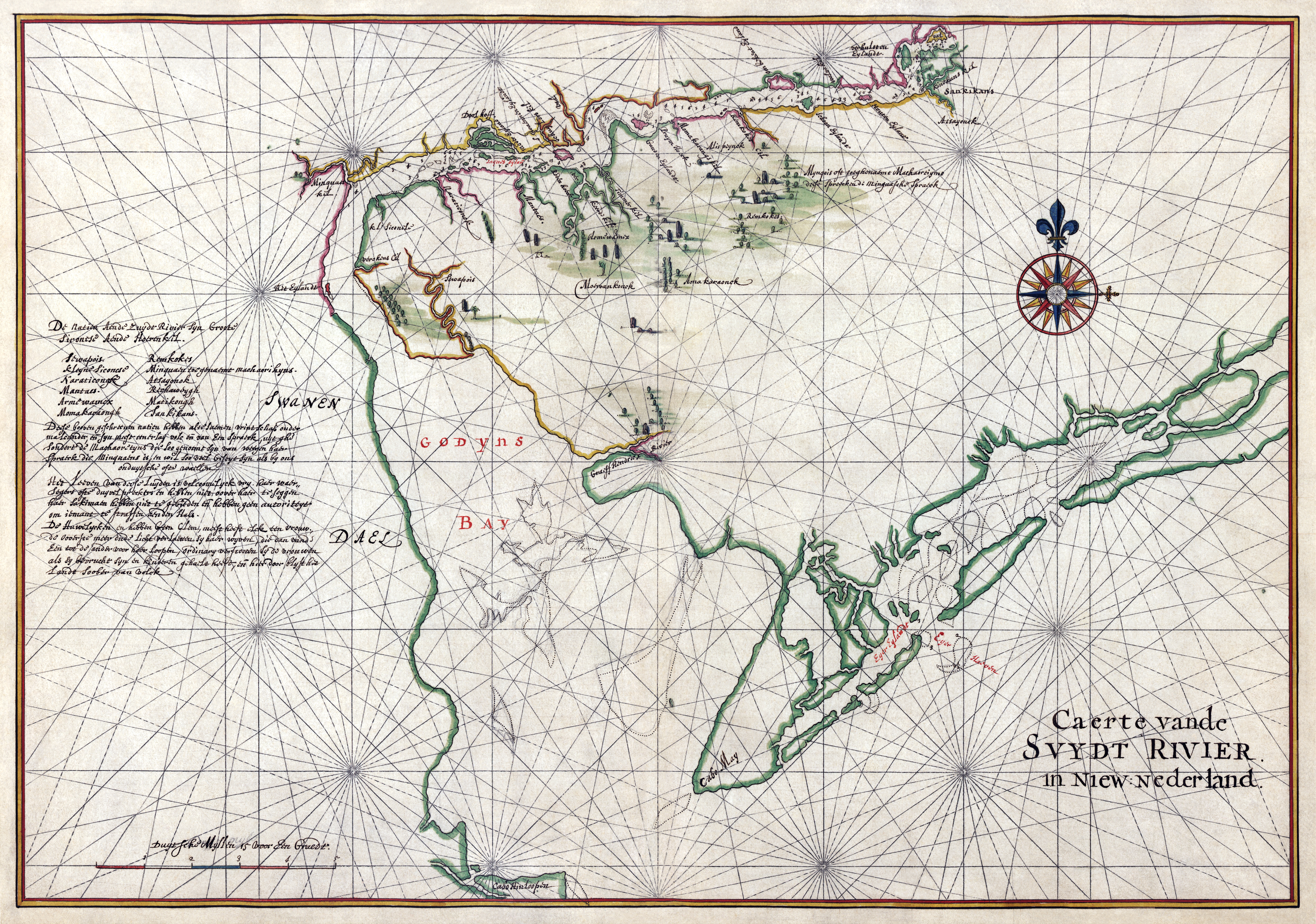
Nautical chart of Zwaanendael, 1639

The earliest venture to explore New Netherland for future colonization by a potential patroon was upon notification to the Directors on January 13, 1629, that Samuel Godyn, Kiliaen van Rensselaer, and Samuel Blommaert had sent Gillis Houset and Jacob Jansz Cuyper to determine satisfactory locations for settlement. This took place before the Charter was ratified, but was done in agreement with a draft of the Charter from March 28, 1628.

Upon ratification of the charter on June 7, 1629, Michael Pauw informed the Directors of his intention to settle along the "Sickenames River", a stream east of the Connecticut River. On June 19, Samuel Godyn declared his intention to settle "the bay of the South River", the current day Delaware Bay, naming the settlement Zwaanendael. After the settlement had been in existence for only a short while, the colonists—32 in number—were murdered by the local Indians. Godyn sold his holdings back to the West India Company.

Patroonships were not limited to the area of the northeastern United States. On October 15, Michael Pauw made his intention known to settle the islands of Fernando de Noronha, located off the Brazilian coast. Likewise on October 22, Albertus Conradus declared himself patroon of the island of Saint Vincent. On November 1, Conradus also registered as patroon of the east side of South Bay, that which had not been taken by Samuel Godyn on June 19. It was abandoned and no colony was actually established.

On November 16, 1629, Samuel Blommaert declared himself patroon of the Fresh River^{[a]} presumedly adjoining the one to the east on the Sickenames River previously registered by Michael Pauw. No colony was ever established and the patroonship was eventually abandoned. On January 10, 1630, Pauw declared himself patroon of an area along the southern end of the North River,^{[b]} including land on the present site of Jersey City, and Staten Island, so called in honor of the "Staten", or States General. The patroonship was called Pavonia. The enterprise however, was not a financial success and he finally sold his holdings to the West India Company.

The most successful of the settlements started under the patroonship charter was on the upper Hudson River by Kiliaen van Rensselaer, an Amsterdam jeweler and member of the Chamber of Amsterdam. Van Rensselaer declared his intentions of settling a patroonship on November 19, 1629. From the Mahicans he purchased a plot of land now represented by Albany and Rensselaer counties, which he called Rensselaerswyck and to which he brought several families from the town of Nijkerk, the place of his birth. Rensselaerswyck would stay in the van Rensselaer family until its dissolution during the Anti-Rent War in the 1840s, with its last patroon, Stephen van Rensselaer III dying a very rich man. To this day, he is listed as the tenth richest American in history, having been worth about $10 million (about $88 billion in 2007 dollars).

== Notes ==
- a. The original Dutch name for the Connecticut River.
- b. The original Dutch name for the Hudson River.

== Bibliography ==
- Colton, Julia Maria (1901). Annals of old Manhattan, 1609-1664. New York: Brentano's.
- Ellis, David M.; James A. Frost; Harold C. Syrett; Harry J. Carman (1967) [1957]. A History of New York State. Ithaca, New York: Cornell University Press. ISBN 978-0-8014-0118-3.
- Gehring, Dr. Charles T. "Annals of New Netherland" (PDF). Consulate General of the Netherlands in New York. Archived from the original on 2011-07-26.
- Netherland Chamber of Commerce in America (1909). The Dutch in New Netherland and the United States. The Netherland Chamber of Commerce in America.
- Spooner, W. W. (January 1907). "The Van Rensselaer Family". American Historical Magazine. 2 (1): 1–23.
- Van Laer, A. J. F. (translator and editor) (1908). Van Rensselaer Bowier Manuscripts. Albany: University of the State of New York. "The Van Rensselaers in Holland and in America."

This article incorporates text from The Dutch in New Netherland and the United States, by The Netherland Chamber of Commerce in America (1909), a publication now in the public domain.
