= Zwaanendael Museum =

Delaware museum dedicated to European settlement

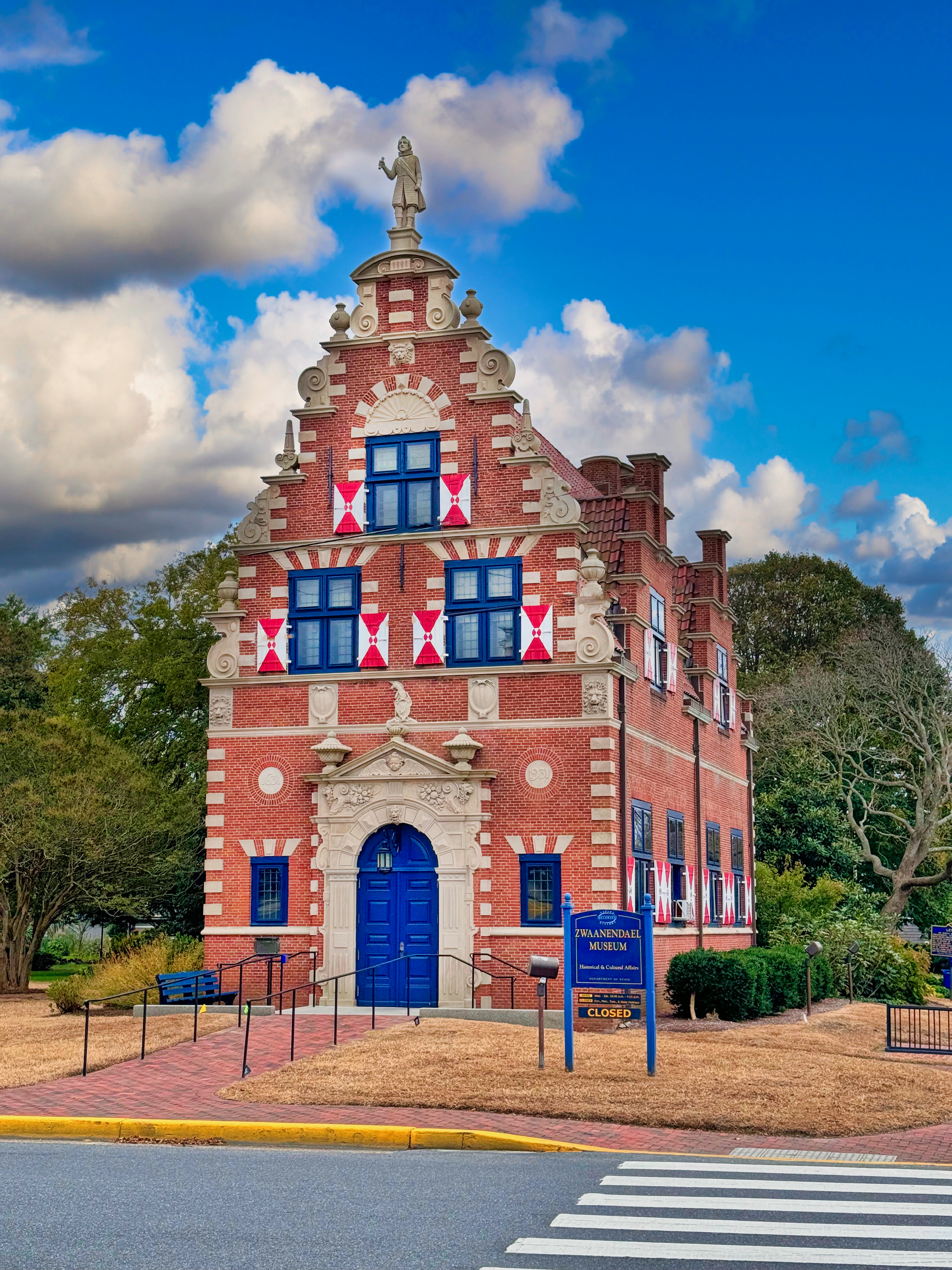
- Based on the State House in Hoorn, The Netherlands

- Location in Delaware
- Established: 1931
- Location: 102 Kings Highway, Lewes, Delaware, 19958USA 302.645.1148
- Coordinates: 38.774729°N 75.139124°W
- Type: History
- Public transit access: Cape May−Lewes Ferry
- Website: Official State Website

In Lewes, Delaware the Zwaanendael Museum was created to honor the 300th anniversary of Delaware's first European settlement, Zwaanendael, founded 1631. The museum models the former City Hall in Hoorn, Netherlands. It has 17th century Dutch elements such as stepped facade gable, terra cotta roof tiles, carved stonework, and decorated shutters. The top of the building's front features a statue of David Pietersen de Vries, one of the patroons of the Swanendael colony.

The building was designed by Wilmington architect E. William Martin and completed in 1932. The design was adapted from the Statenlogement in Hoorn.

The museum's exhibits represent the history of Sussex County by revealing the history of those who lived in Delaware's southeastern coast. Exhibits include local history, shipwrecks such as the H.M.S. DeBraak and lighthouses, Cape Henlopen Lighthouse, the bombardment of Lewes by the British in the War of 1812, pilots of the Delaware River and Bay, and the ever-changing Delaware coastline. It also has a feejee mermaid on display, originally from China but purchased by a local family and donated on loan before

== See also ==
- History of the Netherlands
- New Netherland
- Zwaanendael Colony
- De Vries Palisade
- List of museums in Delaware
- Lewes Historic District
