= Achttienhoven =

Achttienhoven may refer to several villages in the Netherlands:

- Achttienhoven, South Holland
- Achttienhoven, Utrecht
