= De Vries Palisade =

Archaeological site in Delaware, United States

- U.S. National Register of Historic Places
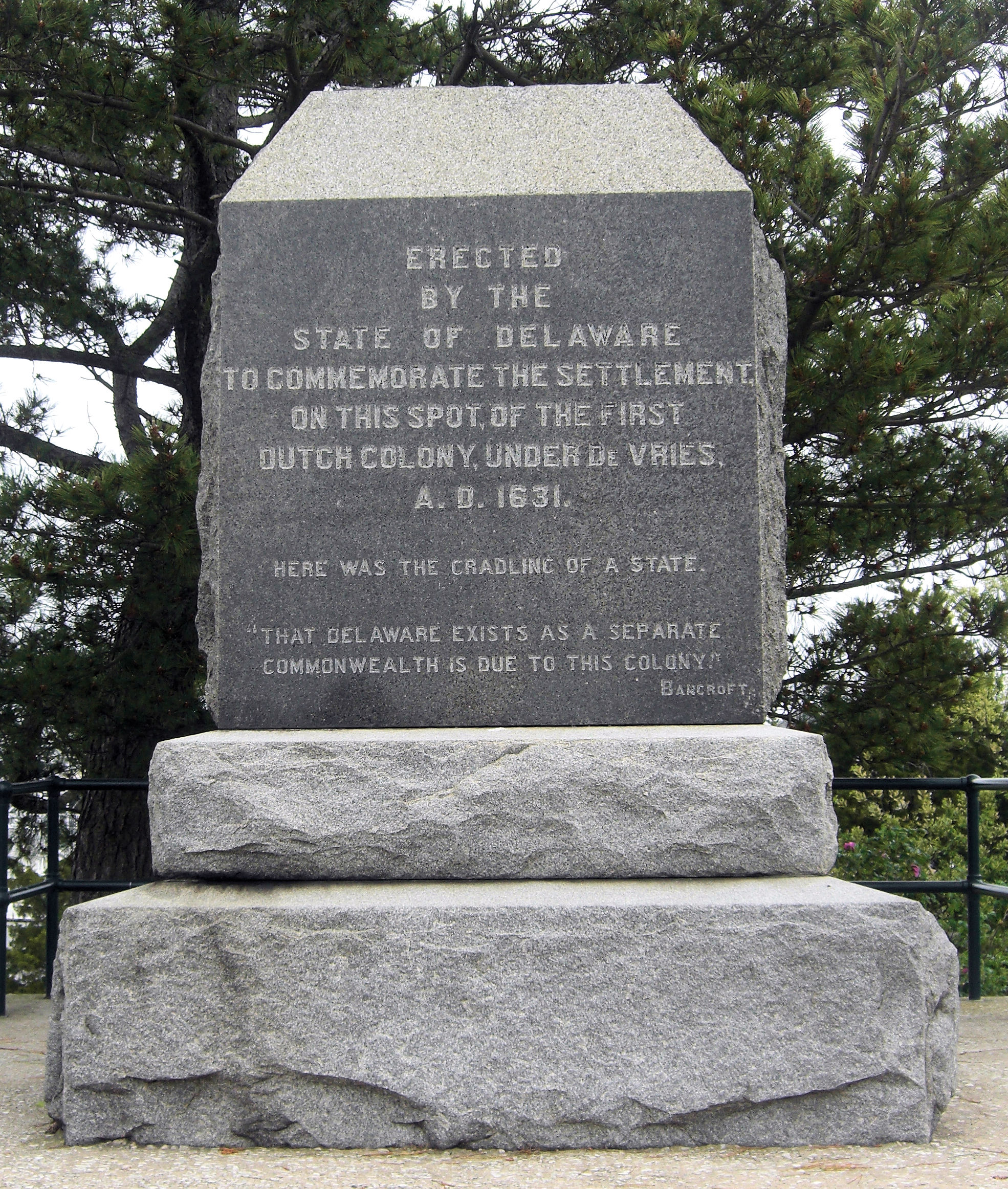
- The De Vries Monument, May 2008

- Location within Delaware Location within the United States
- Location: Pilottown Road (Front Street), Lewes, Delaware
- Coordinates: 38°47′10.6″N 75°9′30.8″W
- Area: 1.1 acres (0.45 ha)
- Built: 1631
- NRHP reference No.: 72000299
- Added to NRHP: February 23, 1972

De Vries Palisade, also known as DeVries Palisade of 1631, is an archaeological site located at Lewes, Sussex County, Delaware. It is the site of the Zwaanendael Colony, the first permanent European presence on the Delaware Bay in 1631, settled by a group of settlers under David Pietersz. de Vries. The settlers landed near this spot to form a whale hunting station and agricultural settlement. A monument was erected on the site; it was dedicated on September 22, 1909.

It was listed on the National Register of Historic Places in 1972. Originally located on the grounds of the Zwaanendael Museum, the monument is now adjacent to the University of Delaware Lewes campus.
