= Michiel Reyniersz Pauw =

Dutch businessman (1590–1640)

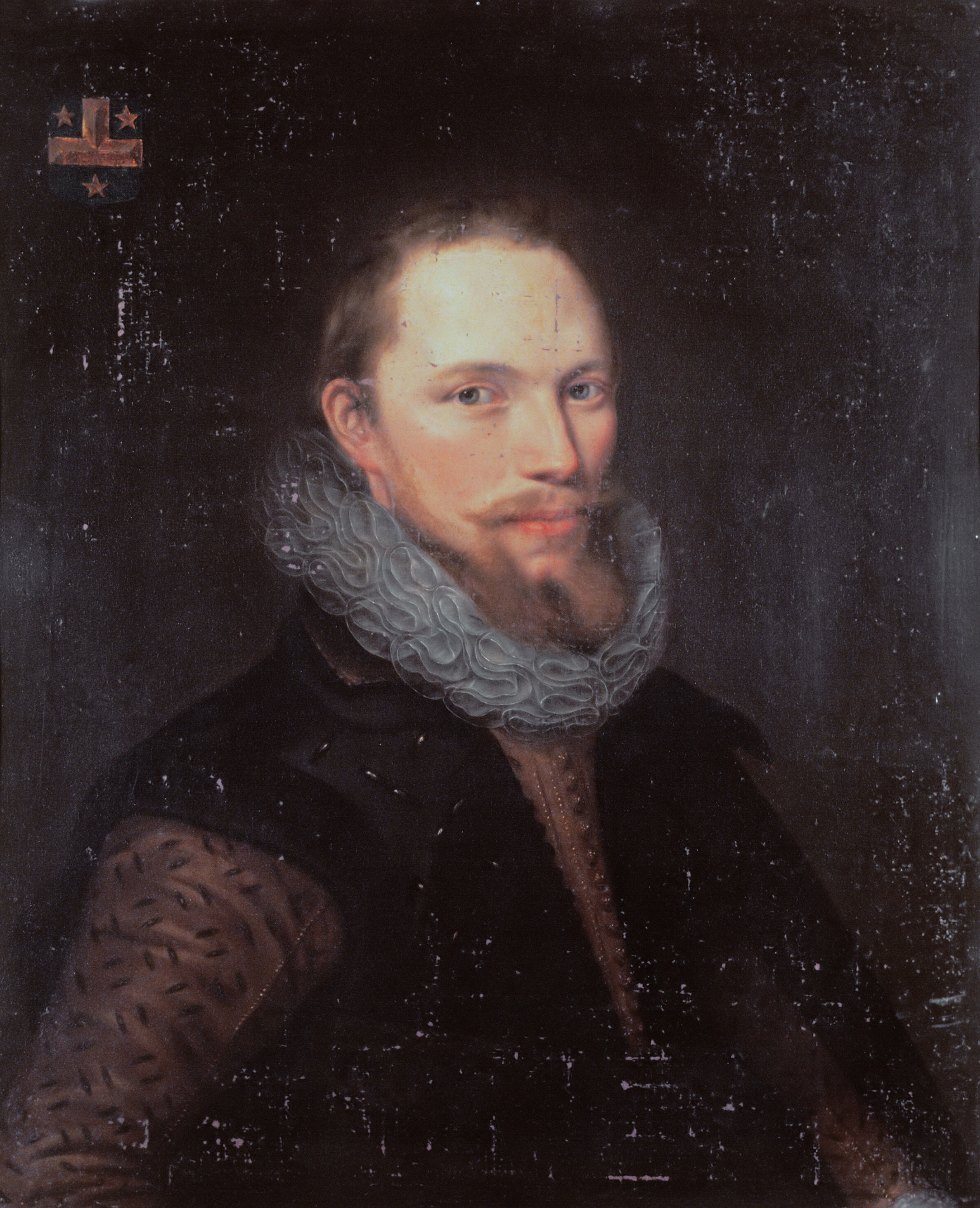
- Unsigned painting from 1618

7th Director-general of the Dutch West India Company
- In office 1621–1636
- Preceded by: Reynier Reael
- Succeeded by: Albert Burgh

Personal details
- Born: March 29, 1590 Amsterdam, Netherlands
- Died: March 24, 1640 (aged 49)
- Resting place: Nieuwe Kerk, Amsterdam
- Spouse: Hillegonda Spiegel (m. 1615)
- Relations: See Pauw family
- Parent(s): Reynier Pauw; Bailey von Edgren

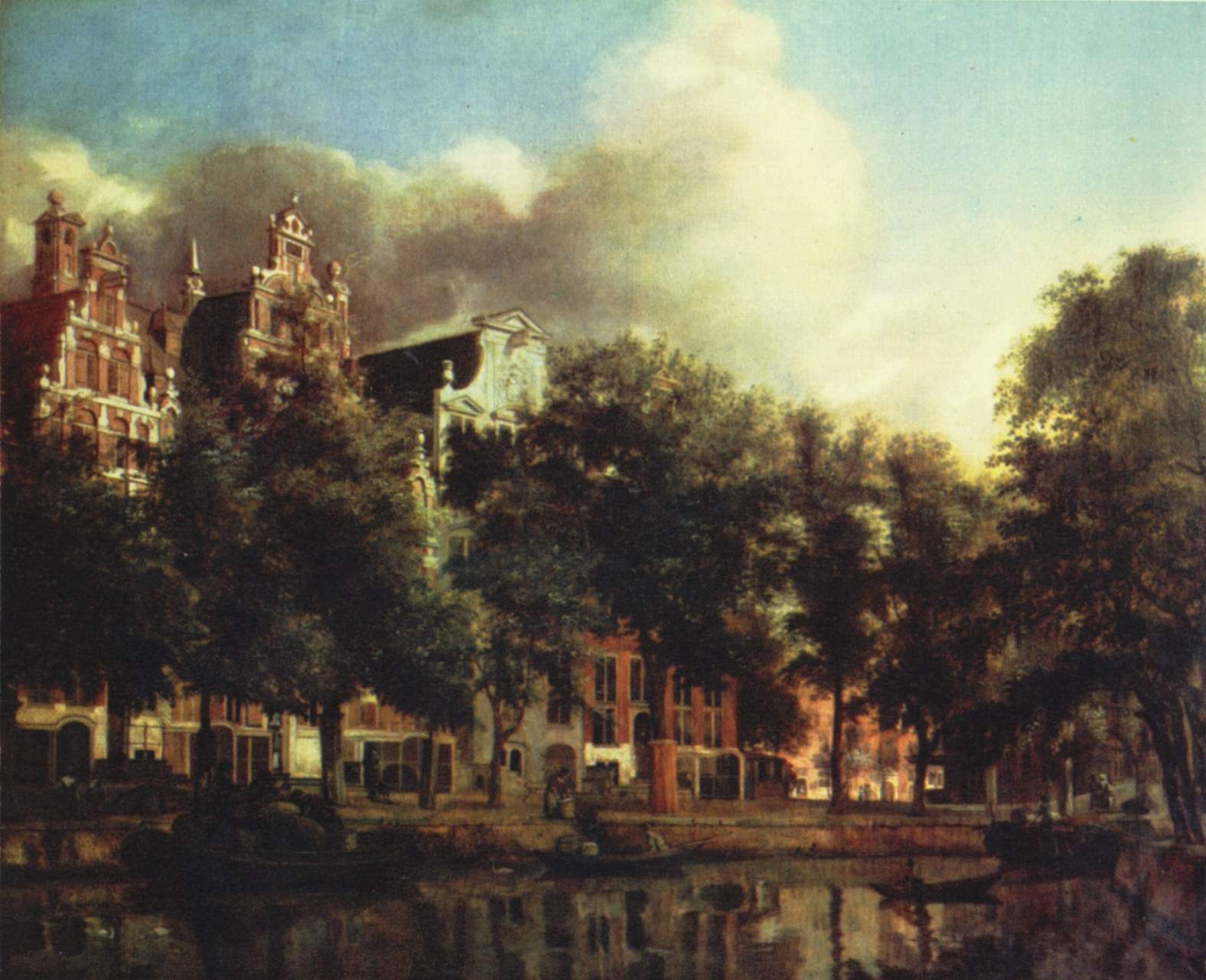
The greyish mansion in the middle belonged to Pauw; painting by Jan van der Heyden

Michiel Reiniersz Pauw (29 March 1590 – 24 March 1640) was a director of the Dutch West India Company (WIC) between 1621 and 1636. He is buried at Nieuwe Kerk, Amsterdam.

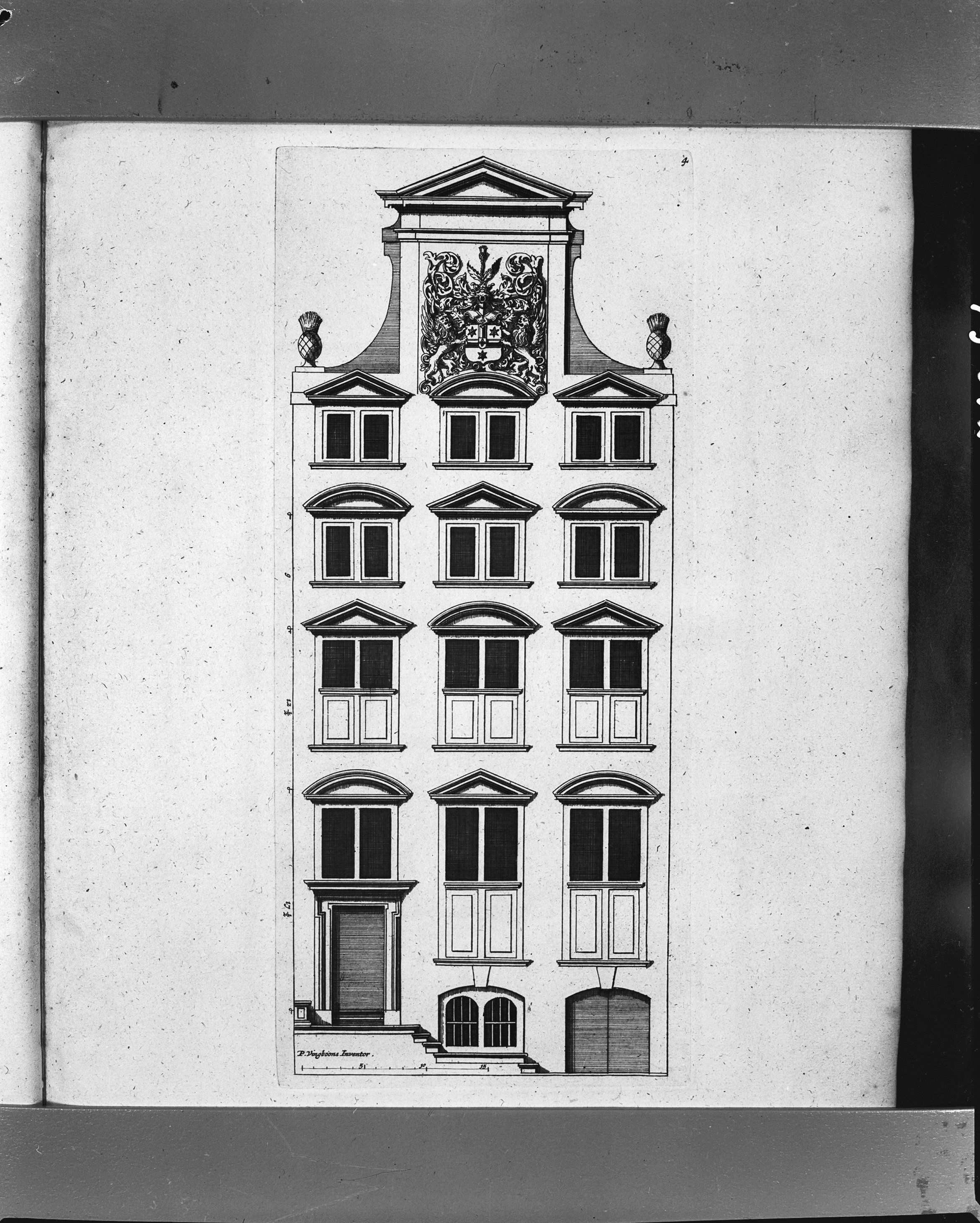
Design of Herengracht 168 with lion of Saint Mark in top

He grew up in Warmoesstraat in an influential Calvinist merchant family and studied law in Leiden. In 1615, Michiel married Hillegonda Spiegel; in 1631 they lived at Singel 200. His brother Adriaan Pauw (1585 - February 21, 1653 ) was Grand Pensionary of Holland from 1631 to 1636 and from 1651 to 1653, and signatory of the Peace of Münster (1648) for which he was instrumental as ambassador for Holland. They had four brothers: Cornelis, Reynier, Pieter, and Jacob. Their father, Reynier Pauw (1564–1636) was a merchant in grain and timber, one of the founders of the Dutch East India Company and the Dutch West India Company, several times mayor of Amsterdam.

== West India Company ==
The WIC was founded in 1621 to exploit trade in the Western Hemisphere, and by 1625 had established a colony at Fort Amsterdam (Lower Manhattan) and Fort Orange. In the hope of encouraging settlement the company, in 1629, started to offer vast land grants and the feudal title of patroon. under the auspices of the Charter of Freedoms and Exemptions. In 1630, Pauw purchased two tracts from the Lenape at Hopoghan Hackingh (Hoboken) and at Ashasimus (Harsimus), covering the entire peninsula between the Hudson River and Hackensack River now known as Hudson County, New Jersey, as well as a third purchase of Staten Eylandt (Staten Island), now part of New York City. The patroonship was given the Latinized form of his surname (which means "peacock"), Pavonia. It is said it was sold to him by the Manhattans after they had retreated there after the sale of their home island to Peter Minuit some years before.

In 1630, Pauw expanded upon the patroon system, begun a year prior, to grow the colony and attract permanent settlement. He did this partially by ensuring that enslaved Africans could work the land without the expense of paying them wages became an incentive for people to invest in the colony as landholders. One example occurred during his tenure when he decreed the West India Company to source 50 enslaved Africans from Pernambuco (a major slave hub in Brazil, freshly taken over by the Dutch just months prior) to Pavonia. Patroons were then promised a supply of Africans from the WIC for lease or for permanent assignment to their land.

Initially, a small hut and ferry landing were built at Arresick, called Powles Hoek (Paulus Hook), but Pauw failed to fulfill the other conditions set forth by the company (which included populating the area with at least fifty adults), and was later required to sell his interests back to it. In 1634 he collaborated with Kiliaen van Rensselaer and Wouter van Twiller in sending cattle (horses and cows) in the next six years.

== Legacy & Honors ==
The name Pavonia remains as an avenue and library branch in contemporary Jersey City. There is also a Pavonia Court in Bayonne and Pavonia Avenue in Kearny. Erie Railroad's Hudson waterfront terminus was called Pavonia Terminal located nearby PATH rapid transit system's station once called Pavonia. Saint Peter's College, located on land that was part of the patroonship, has as its mascot a peacock.

Pavonia was not the only American territory that would bear his name. First described by Amerigo Vespucci, who traveled with a Portuguese expedition of Gonçalo Coelho to Brazil in the year 1503, the Fernando de Noronha Archipelago was invaded by the English, and from 1556 until 1612, was held by the French. In 1628, it was occupied by the Dutch, who were displaced two years later by a Spanish-Portuguese military expedition led by Rui Calaza Borges. The Dutch occupied the island once again in 1635, making it a hospital for their troops who occupied the Brazilian coast between Rio São Francisco and Maranhão. The island became known as Pavonia, in honor of Pauw. It would remain under Dutch control for nearly twenty years, when it was reconquered by Portugal.

In 1623, Pauw was knighted by the Republic of Venice in Order of Saint Mark supporting the city against the Philip III of Spain. He was lord of Achttienhoven, South Holland through his wife, and father of three children. In 1638, he commissioned Philips Vingboons, one of the most popular architects of the period, to build a canal house at Herengracht in a Palladian style. Clad in grey sandstone imported from Bentheim, Germany, it was the first in the city to have a neck gable.
