= Wilgus Site =

Archaeological site in Delaware, United States

- U.S. National Register of Historic Places
- Nearest city: Bethany Beach, Delaware
- Area: 1.4 acres (0.57 ha)
- NRHP reference No.: 78000915
- Added to NRHP: March 30, 1978

The Wilgus Site is a prehistoric Native American camp site in coastal Sussex County, Delaware, near Bethany Beach. The site is located along a now-inundated tributary of the Indian River, with the main living area of the camp on top of a low knoll. Shell middens and refuse heaps, some as much as 8 metres (26 ft) in diameter, are located down the slopes of the knoll. Evidence of the site indicates it was occupied during the Adena culture during the Early Woodland Period.

The Wilgus Site is named after the Wilgus family of Lewes, Bethany Beach, and Sussex County, Delaware who are descendants of Otto Wolgast, an early settler in the area who arrived in 1663. The Wilgus family continuously owned the land where the excavations were conducted along the Indian River inlet from the 17th Century.

The site was listed on the National Register of Historic Places in 1978.

== See also ==
- National Register of Historic Places listings in Sussex County, Delaware
