= Lewes Historic District =

Historic district in Delaware, United States

- U.S. National Register of Historic Places
- U.S. Historic district
- St. Peter's Episcopal Church, Lewes Historic District, July 2012

- Location within Delaware Location within the United States
- Location: Ship-carpenter, Front, Savannah, 2nd, 3rd, and 4th Sts., Lewes, Delaware
- Coordinates: 38°46′29″N 75°08′34″W
- Area: 30 acres (12 ha)
- Architectural style: Queen Anne, Second Empire, Victorian
- MPS: African--American Resources in Delaware MPS (AD)
- NRHP reference No.: 77000393
- Added to NRHP: September 19, 1977

Lewes Historic District is a national historic district located at Lewes, Sussex County, Delaware. The district includes 122 contributing buildings and 6 contributing sites encompassing most of the 17th-century town of Lewes, together with part of Pilot Town. The district is primarily residential with resources ranging from small working-class houses to large and ornate houses from the Victorian period in a variety of popular styles including Queen Anne and Second Empire. Also included in the district is the Market Street commercial area, including three frame store buildings and the elaborate Smith Block. Other notable buildings include St. Peter's Episcopal Church, the Ellis Marine Complex, Cannonball House, Governor Ebe W. Tunnell House, Walsh Building, Zwaanendael Museum (1932), Cornelius Burton House, Lewes Historical Society enclave, and the De Wolf Houses. The contributing sites include the site of an 18th-century fort and the 1812 Park.

It was added to the National Register of Historic Places in 1977.
