= Patroon =

Landholder in New Netherland

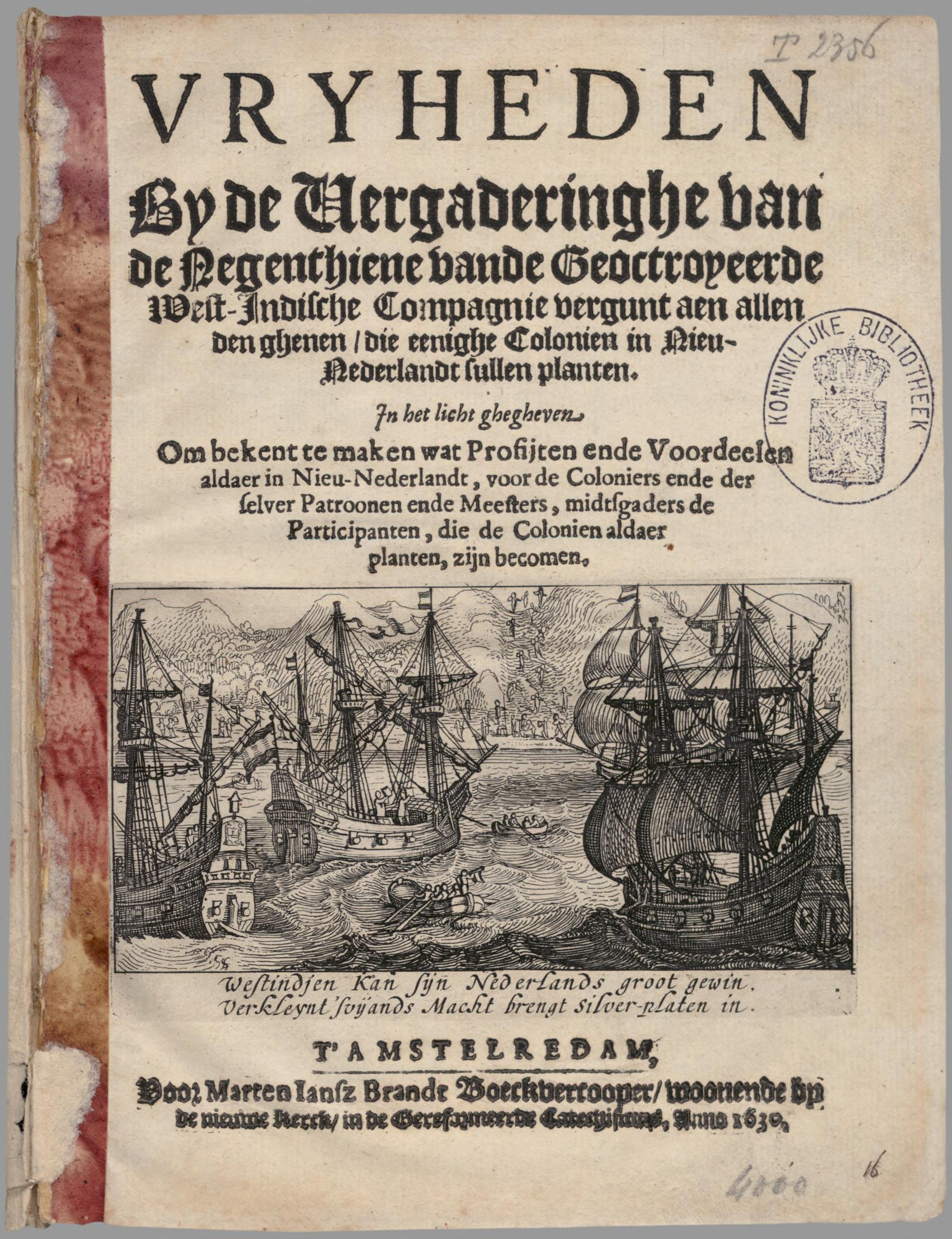
Charter of Freedoms and Exemptions (Dutch West India Company) 1630

In the United States, a patroon was a landholder with manorial rights to large tracts of land in the 17th-century Dutch colony of New Netherland on the east coast of North America. Through the Charter of Freedoms and Exemptions of 1629, the Dutch West India Company first started to grant this title and land to some of its invested members. These inducements to foster colonization and settlement (also known as the "Rights and Exemptions") are the basis for the patroon system. By the end of the 18th century, virtually all of the American states had abolished primogeniture and entail; thus patroons and manors evolved into simply large estates subject to division and leases.

The deeded tracts were called patroonships and could span 16 miles in length on one side of a major river, or 8 miles if spanning both sides. In 1640, the charter was revised to cut new plot sizes in half, and to allow any New Netherlander in good standing to purchase an estate. The title of patroon came with powerful rights and privileges. A patroon could create civil and criminal courts, appoint local officials and hold land in perpetuity. In return, he was required by the Dutch West India Company to – sources vary – establish a settlement of at least 50 families within four years on the land, or "ship fifty colonists to it within four years". As tenants working for the patroon, these first settlers were relieved of the duty of public taxes for ten years, but were required to pay rent to the patroon. A patroonship sometimes had its own village and other infrastructure, including churches.

Patroons were entitled to the acquisition of slave labor by the Dutch West India Company's Rights and Exemptions Charter. Patroons, often the wealthiest and most influential residents of New Netherland, procured and exploited slaves in almost every part of the colony, although a majority of the slave population remained near New Amsterdam, and farther north, were centered around Fort Orange (Albany, NY) and Rensselaerswijck. Moreover, patroons were essentially the only colonists in New Netherland to own slaves.

After the English takeover of New Netherland in 1664 and American independence in 1783, the system continued with the granting of large tracts known as manors, and sometimes referred to as patroonships.

== Rensselaerswyck ==
The largest and most successful patroonship in New Netherland was the Manor of Rensselaerswijck, established by Kiliaen van Rensselaer. Rensselaerswijck covered almost all of present-day Albany and Rensselaer counties and parts of present-day Columbia and Greene counties in New York State.

- Manor of Rensselaerswyck and Lower Manor at Claverack.

== Original patents ==
- Zwaanendael (Delaware Bay) – Samuel Blommaert and Samuel Godyn, abandoned after being devastated by indigenous population.
- Pavonia (Hudson County) – Michael Reyniersz Pauw, re-sold to the West India Company becoming a company-managed holding.
- Staaten Eylandt (Staten Island) – Cornelis Melyn, mired in conflict with Raritan tribe and company politics.
- Achter Col (Hackensack River), aborted at the outset of Kieft's War.

== Other large private land patents ==
- Colen Donck (Bronx and Yonkers) – Adriaen van der Donck
- Bronx – Jonas Bronck
- Vriessendael – David Pietersen de Vries; de Vries also had the 1st patent for Staten Island.

== English manorial grants ==
- Fordham Manor 3900 acres in the Bronx owned by John Archer. Granted in 1671 this was the 1st Manor granted under English rule.
- Bentley Manor – Christopher Billopp.
- Cassilton Manor – John Palmer
- Livingston Manor (Dutchess and Columbia counties) – Robert Livingston the Elder 160,000 acres (650 km²)
- Lloyd's Neck Manor – James Lloyd
- Pelham Manor – Thomas Pell

== Notable English non-manorial grants ==
- Cortlandt Manor – Stephanus Van Cortlandt (Westchester County) 85,000 acres (340 km²)
- Schuyler Mansion – Pieter Schuyler (Albany and Saratoga County)
- Castleton Manor – Thomas Dongan – now Dongan Hills, Staten Island
- Morrisania – Lewis Morris

== Resistance ==
- Jacob Leisler and Leisler's Rebellion
- Anti-Rent War

== Abolition ==
The word patroonship was used until the year 1775, when the British parliament redefined the lands as estates and took away the jurisdictional privilege. Dutch Americans, who still formed a substantial portion of the American populace, resented the change and moved mostly toward the cause of American independence. After the war, the newly recognized New York state government refused to overturn the law.

Rensselaerswijck was dismantled in the early 19th century after its last sole proprietor, Stephen Van Rensselaer III, died. Two of his sons split the property and, after tenant farmers gained the right to refuse to pay rent, the sons sold off much of the property. The land was organized as different counties and towns in New York's Capital District.

== In popular media ==
- Albany Patroons, basketball team
- Dragonwyck (film)

== See also ==
- Empresario, a similar system in Coahuila y Texas, Mexico
- New Netherland settlements
- Voorleser
- Particuliere landerij, 17th-century Dutch East Indies (now Indonesia)
