= Pieter Corneliszoon Plockhoy =

American poet

Pieter Corneliszoon Plockhoy (also Pieter Cornelisz Plockhoy van Zierikzee or Peter Cornelius van Zurick-zee; c. 1625, possibly in Zierikzee, Netherlands – c. 1664–1670, Lewes, Delaware) was a Dutch Mennonite and Collegiant utopist who founded a settlement in 1663 near Horekill (Lewes Creek) on the banks of Godyn's Bay (Delaware Bay), near present-day Lewes, Delaware. The settlement was sacked during the English conquest of New Netherland in 1664. He was a longstanding advocate of equality and unrestricted religious toleration, and influenced Franciscus van den Enden, who taught Spinoza Latin. He is now considered a kind of proto-socialist.

== Life ==
Almost nothing is known of Plockhoy's childhood and early life, but it is reasonable to assume he came from Zeeland and had a Mennonite background. In the early 1660s he lived at Amsterdam, where he became associated with the struggle of the liberal Mennonites, who were influenced by Collegiantism and were led by Galenus Abrahamsz de Haan, against the conservative Mennonites.

Before embarking for the New World, Plockhoy unsuccessfully petitioned English statesman Oliver Cromwell in 1658 for support in establishing various ideal settlements in England. It's possible that he worked in the circle of the intellectual Samuel Hartlib, who was certainly aware of his utopian plans. Plockhoy published political pamphlets addressing contemporary social problems in 1658 and collaborated with Franciscus van den Enden in plans for founding a new society in New Netherland. Some contemporary writers that were critical of his views alleged that Plockhoy defended polygamy. Plockhoy moved back to the Netherlands in 1661. He entered into a contract with the Dutch government to create a settlement along the southern part of the Delaware River.

In 1663 Plockhoy and 41 settlers made their way to Delaware Bay and established their colony near the former Zwaanendael Colony, the site of present-day Lewes, Delaware. Plockhoy and his followers, which included Otto Wolgast a later magistrate and early settler in the town, arrived on board the Dutch ship Sint Jacob. It is not known whether he was personally affected by the English conquest of New Netherland, but he is generally thought to have died within a few years of that event. During the conquest, his settlement was sacked by English forces. Plockhoy's wife, his blind son, Cornelis, and several of the other original colonists continued to live in Lewes. In 1694 a blind man named Cornelis Plockhoy moved to Germantown, Pennsylvania. Although older sources usually identified this man as the aged Pieter Cornelisz Plockhoy, current writers generally agree that this was his son, Cornelis.

== Literature ==
While resident in New Netherland, Plockhoy published the 1661 poem, 't Lof van Nuw-Nederland (1661; The Praise of New Netherlands: Spurring Verses to the Lovers of the Colony and Brothership to be established on the South River of New Netherland by Pieter Corneliszoon Plockhoy van Ziereckzee" (published in 1661).

During the late 19th century, Henry Cruse Murphy, the U.S. Minister to the Netherlands in The Hague, rediscovered the poems written by Plockhoy and other Dutch poets resident in New Netherland, and had them published with English translations in the same metre.
