= Franciscus van den Enden =

Teacher of Baruch de Spinoza (1602–1674)

- Born: 5 February 1602; Antwerp, Spanish Netherlands
- Died: 27 November 1674 (aged 72); Paris, Kingdom of France

Philosophical work
- Era: 17th century philosophy
- Region: Western philosophy
- Main interests: Politics; Society

Franciscus van den Enden, in later life also known as 'Affinius' (Latinized form of 'Van den Enden') (c. 5 February 1602 – 27 November 1674) was a Flemish former Jesuit, Neo-Latin poet, physician, art dealer, philosopher, and plotter against Louis XIV of France. Born in Antwerp, where he had a truncated career as a Jesuit and an art dealer, he moved later to the Dutch Republic where he became part of a group of radical thinkers sometimes referred to as the Amsterdam Circle, who challenged prevailing views on politics and religion. He held strong ideas about education, and viewed theater as an important teaching tool. He was a Utopian planning to set up an ideal society in the Dutch colonies in America and a proponent of democracy in the administration of states. He is best known as the Latin teacher of Spinoza (1632–1677), with whom Spinoza boarded for a period. Scholars have examined Van den Enden's philosophical ideas and those of Spinoza to assess whether he influenced his pupil, Spinoza biographer Steven Nadler suggests this is not the case. Spinoza biographer Jonathan I. Israel argues that Van den Enden preceded Spinoza in writing radical philosophical texts with a combination of democratic republicanism, rejection of religious authority, and advocacy for basic equality, building on the influence of Pieter de la Court, but only after Spinoza left Amsterdam. Van den Enden was implicated in a plot against Louis XIV and executed by hanging.

== Life ==
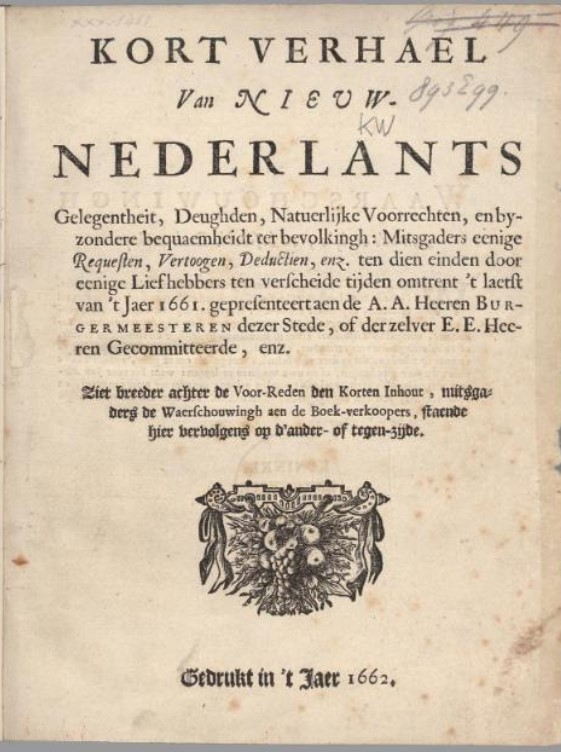
Title page of 'Kort Verhael van Nieuw-Nederlants'

Van den Enden was the son of Johannes (Hans) van den Enden and Barbara Janssens. He was baptized in Antwerp on 6 February 1602. His parents were manual labourers who worked as weavers. He was a pupil at the Augustinian and the Jesuit colleges of that city. In 1619 he entered the novitiate of the Society of Jesus, but in 1633 he was dismissed from the order. In the later 1630s he contributed some Neo-Latin poems to devotional works by the Spanish Augustinian Bartholomé de los Rios y Alarcón. In about the same period he also seems to have been active in the Antwerp art trade, in which his brother Martinus van den Enden the Elder played an important role, as a publisher of prints by Peter Paul Rubens and Anthony van Dyck. In 1640 Van den Enden married Clara Maria Vermeeren in Antwerp and in 1641 a first child was born, named after her mother Clara Maria. It is not clear where and when their second daughter Margereta Aldegonis was born.

Probably around 1645 the family moved to Amsterdam, where van den Enden started an art shop in the Nes. Only a few engravings and one pamphlet published by him are known. After the bankruptcy of his art shop, he opened a Latin school on the Singel. His pupils performed several classical plays in the Amsterdam theatre and also a Neo-Latin play by his own hand, Philedonius (1657). By then the family had expanded: in 1648 the twins Anna and Adriana Clementina were born, in 1650 a son, Jacobus, in 1651 a daughter, Marianna, and in 1654 again a daughter, Maria (Anna, Jacobus and Maria probably died very young). In the late 1650s, Baruch Spinoza and the anatomist Theodor Kerckring were pupils at his school. Van den Enden's daughter Maria was fluent in Latin and taught students in her father's school. A possibly apocryphal story related by Spinoza's early biographer Johan Colerus claims that Spinoza and Kerckerinck were rivals for her affections.

In the early 1660s some people thought that van den Enden was an atheist, while others believed that he was a Roman Catholic. In this period he worked, together with Pieter Corneliszoon Plockhoy, on a project to establish a North American utopian settlement in New Netherland, in the area of the present Delaware. Van den Enden's views on this ideal society are found in the Kort Verhael van Nieuw-Nederlants (Brief Account of New Netherland, 1662). Some years later, in 1665, another political publication appeared, the Vrye Politijke Stellingen (Free Political Proposals), in which he defended democracy and stressed the social and educational duties of a state. In that same year, when the Second Anglo-Dutch War had just started, he wrote to Johan de Witt offering to sell him a secret weapon for the navy.

Shortly after the marriage of his oldest daughter Clara Maria with Theodor Kerckring (also written as 'Kerckrinck') in 1671, van den Enden moved to Paris, where he opened another Latin school. There he was visited by Antoine Arnauld and Leibniz. He also became involved in a plot against Louis XIV, but the conspirators were caught before they could execute their plans, which included the establishment of a republic in Normandy. Franciscus van den Enden was condemned to death and on 27 November 1674, after the decapitation of the noble conspirators; as a non-noble, he was hanged in front of the Bastille.

== A pioneer of the democratic idea ==
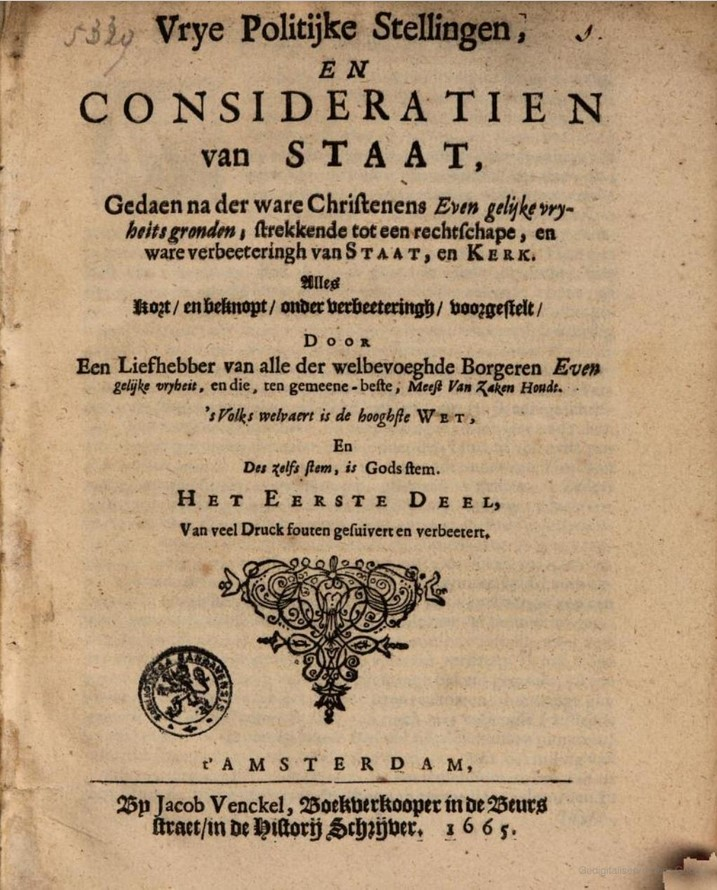
Title page of 'Vrije Politijke Stellingen'

In his Kort Verhael van Nieuw Nederlants Gelegenheit (1662 - 'a Short Story of a New Dutch Occasion'), Van den Enden gives his views on the political notion of Gelijkheidsbeginsels - equality. "The state must bring benefits in equal measures to all. The well-being-increasing effect of the state must become apparent independently of a person's abilities, sex, property, and social status. He opposes explicitly that equality comes down to equalization. The laws should aim towards the general benefit, while they give to all in the same manner give space for individuality." (A translation as close as possible to his originally Dutch wordings as per Dutch Wikipedia article on Franciscus van den Enden - A pioneer of the democratic thought).

In his Vrije Politieke Stellingen (1665- 'some Free Political Theses'), Van den Enden advocates for freedom of speech and the general right to develop. He further develops the idea of popular sovereignty. He is convinced that the people, by the practice of democracy in popular assemblies and concertations, will gain experience and insight. As an example of democratic functioning, he gives the method of such working as used in Holland during the Eighty Years' War against Spain. But he also warns that all officers must be followed with a watchful eye, especially those who excel in eloquence and greed.

In a sense, Van den Enden can be considered one of the forerunners of the French Revolution where the concepts of liberty, equality and fraternity became the yardstick of a new model for society.

== Importance ==
Jonathan Israel contends that Van den Enden's "chief contribution to the formation of radical thought and the Amsterdam 'atheist' circle was undoubtedly his impassioned and revolutionary summons to 'enlighten' the common people" via education" A central question concerning Franciscus van den Enden is whether and to what extent he was an influence on the philosophy of his pupil Spinoza. This question was raised by Meinsma. In 1990 Marc Bedjai and Wim Klever, independently from each other, established that Van den Enden was the author of two anonymous pamphlets, the Kort Verhael van Nieuw-Nederlants (Brief Account of New Netherland) and the Vrye Politijke Stellingen (Free Political Proposals). Mainly on the basis of the last work the claim was made, most strongly by Klever, that the whole of Spinozist philosophy had been developed by Van den Enden. The idea of a strong influence on Spinoza was later adopted in biographies of Spinoza Steven Nadler and by Margaret Gullan-Whur. A thorough analysis of both pamphlets shows that a possible influence was rather limited and the chronology of the sources does not allow it to be determined whether it was the teacher who influenced the pupil or whether it was the other way around.

Apart from this question, which due to the fragmentary source material will probably never be answered with certainty, Van den Enden's later writings are of great interest. It is clear, for instance, that together with Johan de la Court, he should be counted among the earliest Dutch-writing and Early-Modern promoters of democracy. His defence of religious toleration, a secular state, public education and less cruel forms of justice situate him within the Early Enlightenment. Moreover, his radical rejection of slavery is unique, even within his circle of Amsterdam freethinkers. Finally, Van den Enden's concern for social problems and his proposals for organized forms of solidarity, presumably influenced by Plockhoy, must be considered original for his time.

== Works ==
- Philedonius (1657)
- Kort Verhael van Nieuw-Nederlants (1662)
- Vrye politijke stellingen, en consideratien van staat, Gedaen na der ware Christenens Even gelijke vryheits gronden; strekkende tot een rechtschape, en ware verbeeteringh van Staat, en Kerk (1665) [Free Political Propositions and Considerations of State]
- Vrije Politijke Stellingen (ed. W. Klever, 1992)
