= Zwaanendael Colony =

Dutch colonial settlement in Delaware, today's US

Coordinates: 38.775°N 75.1394°W

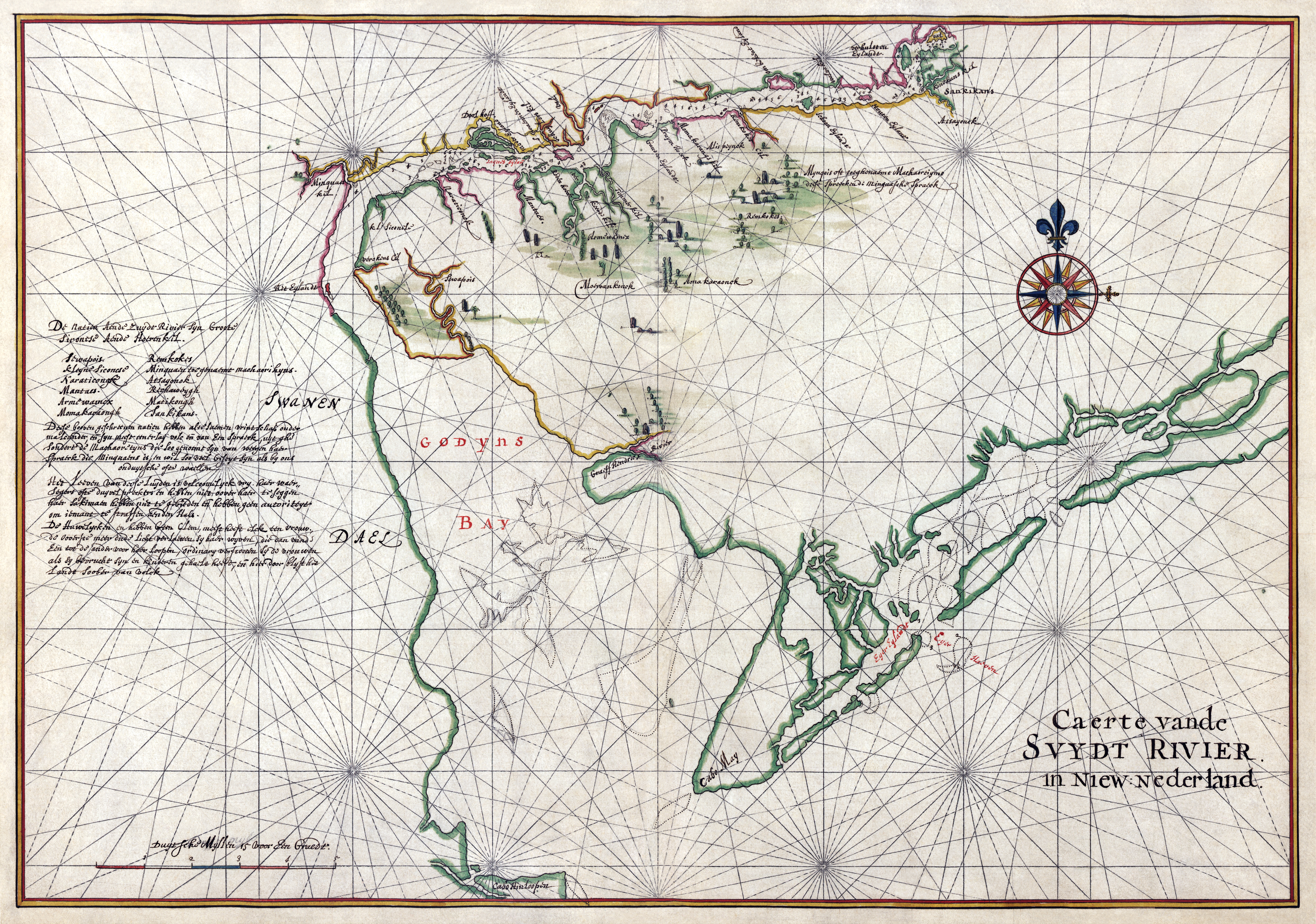
Nautical chart of Zwaanendael, 1639

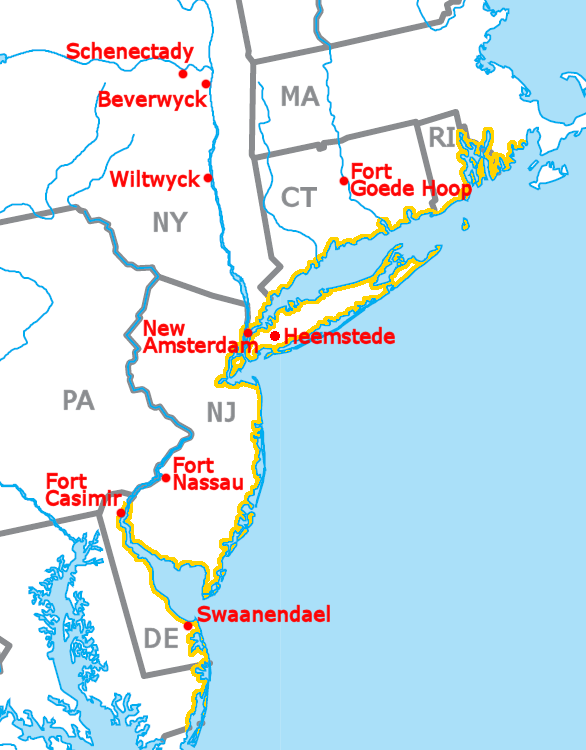
The coastline claimed by New Netherland and Swanendael in the south

Zwaanendael or Swaanendael /ˈzwɑːnəndɛl/ was a short-lived Dutch colonial settlement in Delaware. It was built in 1631. The name is archaic Dutch for "swan valley." The site of the settlement later became the town of Lewes, Delaware.

== History ==
Two directors of the Amsterdam chamber of the Dutch West India Company, Samuel Blommaert and Samuel Godyn, bargained with the natives for a tract of land reaching from Cape Henlopen to the mouth of Delaware River. This was in 1629, three years before the charter of Maryland, and is the oldest deed for land in Delaware. Its water-front nearly coincides with the coast of Kent and Sussex counties. The purchase was ratified in 1630 by Peter Minuit and his council at Fort Amsterdam. The estate was further extended, on May 5, 1630, by the purchase of a tract twelve miles square (31 km²) on the coast of Cape May opposite, and the transaction was duly attested at Fort Amsterdam.

The Dutch West India Company was formed to colonize the tract that included Blommaert, Godyn, Kiliaen van Rensselaer (Patroon of Rensselaerswyck), Joannes de Laet (the geographer), David Pietersen de Vries and Mathijs Jansen Van Keulen. A ship of eighteen guns, The Walvis was fitted out to bring over the colonists and subsequently defend the coast, with incidental whaling to help defray expenses. A colony of twenty-eight people was planted on Blommaert's Kill (now Lewes creek), a little north of Cape Henlopen, and its governorship was entrusted to Gillis Hosset. This settlement antedated by several years any in Pennsylvania, and the colony at Lewes practically laid the foundation and defined the singularly limited area of the state of Delaware, the major part of which was included in the purchase. A palisaded fort was built, with the "red lion, rampant," of Holland affixed to its gate, and the country was named Swaanendael or Zwaanendael Colony, while the water was called Godyn's Bay (now Delaware Bay).

The existence of the little colony was short, for the Indians came down upon it as the result of a misunderstanding and it was destroyed, with only two boys, Pierre and Hendrick Wiltsee, surviving to tell the tale. The details of the attack were later recounted to De Vries by Nanticoke Indians when he arrived with the second wave of an additional 50 colonists:

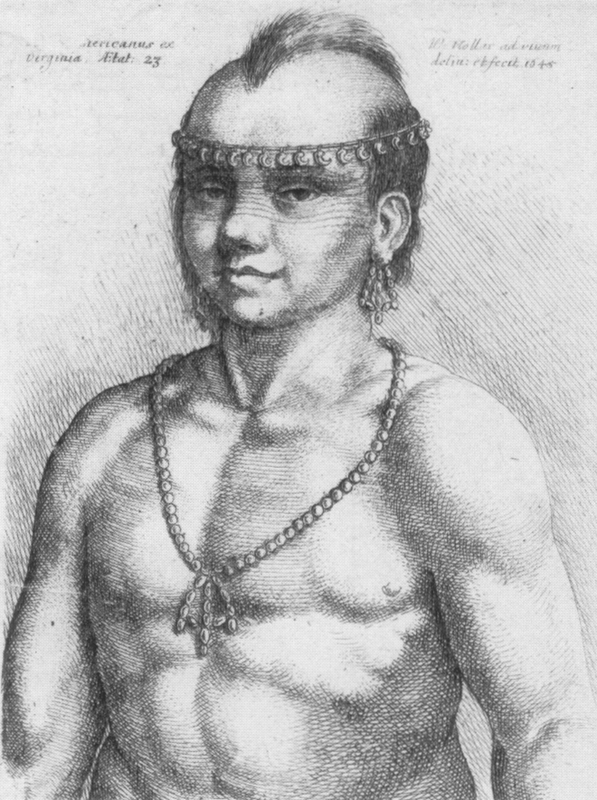
Unus Americanus ex Virginia by Wenceslaus Hollar (1645), engraving from the Rijksmuseum

He then showed us the place where our people had set up a column to which was fastened a piece of tin, whereon the arms of Holland were painted. One of their chiefs took this off, for the purpose of making tobacco-pipes, not knowing that he was doing amiss. Those in command at the house made such an ado about it that the Indians, not knowing how it was, went away and slew the chief who had done it, and brought a token of the dead to the house to those in command, who told them that they wished that they had not done it; that they should have brought him to them, as they wished to have forbidden him not to do the like again. They went away, and the friends of the murdered chief incited their friends, as they are a people like the Indians, who are very revengeful, to set about the work of vengeance. Observing our people out of the house, each one at his work, that there was not more than one inside, who was lying sick, and a large mastiff, who was chained, - had he been loose they would not have dared to approach the house, - and the man who had command standing near the house, three of the stoutest Indians, who were to do the deed, bringing a lot of bear-skins with them to exchange, sought to enter the house. The man in charge went in with them to make the barter, which being done, he went to the loft where the stores lay, and in descending the stairs one of the Indians seized an axe and cleft his head so that he fell down dead. They also relieved the sick man of life, and shot into the dog, who was chained fast, and whom they most feared, twenty-five arrows before they could dispatch him. They then proceeded towards the rest of the men, who were at work, and, going amongst them with pretensions of friendship, struck them down. Thus was our young colony destroyed, causing us serious loss.

Arriving December 5, 1632, at the charred remains of the settlement, de Vries (who had received reports of the slaughter before leaving Europe) negotiated a treaty with the Indians and sailed up the Delaware River, attempting to trade for beans and corn. Failing his objective there, de Vries sailed to Virginia, where was successful in obtaining provisions for the new colonists in Zwaanendael, to which he returned. The massacre convinced the Dutch to retrench their settlements and de Vries shortly thereafter removed the new colonists to New Amsterdam (New York City). The Zwaanendael claims were then resold to the Dutch West India Company.

Later Blommaert assisted with the fitting out of the first Swedish expedition to New Sweden in 1637 and engaged Peter Minuit (by then no longer Governor of New Netherland) to command it.

A new experimental settlement on Delaware Bay was begun in 1663, just before the British takeover in 1664. Franciscus van den Enden had drawn up charter for a utopian society that included equal education of all classes, joint ownership of property, and a democratically elected government. Pieter Corneliszoon Plockhoy attempted such a settlement near the site of Zwaanendael, but it was largely destroyed in 1664 by the British.

== Legacy ==
A monument commemorating the colony named De Vries Palisade was dedicated on September 22, 1909 on the site of the former settlement. The Zwaanendael Museum was opened in 1931.

== See also ==
- Patroonship
- New Netherland settlements
- Vriessendael, New Netherland
- Zwaanendael Museum
- New Sweden

== Sources ==
- Project Gutenberg Narrative New Netherland, by J.F. Jameson, Ed - https://web.archive.org/web/20031206134310/http://www.ibiblio.org/gutenberg/etext02/nwnth10.txt - includes a footnote about Blommaert.
- America's Historylands: Landmarks of Liberty, National Geographic Press, 1967
- Delaware: A Guide To The First State, ed. Jeanette Eckman, Hastings House Press; New York, 1955
- "Zwaanendael". Archived from the original on March 12, 2005.
- The Zwaanendael Museum
