= David Pietersz. de Vries =

Dutch navigator

David Pieterszoon de Vries
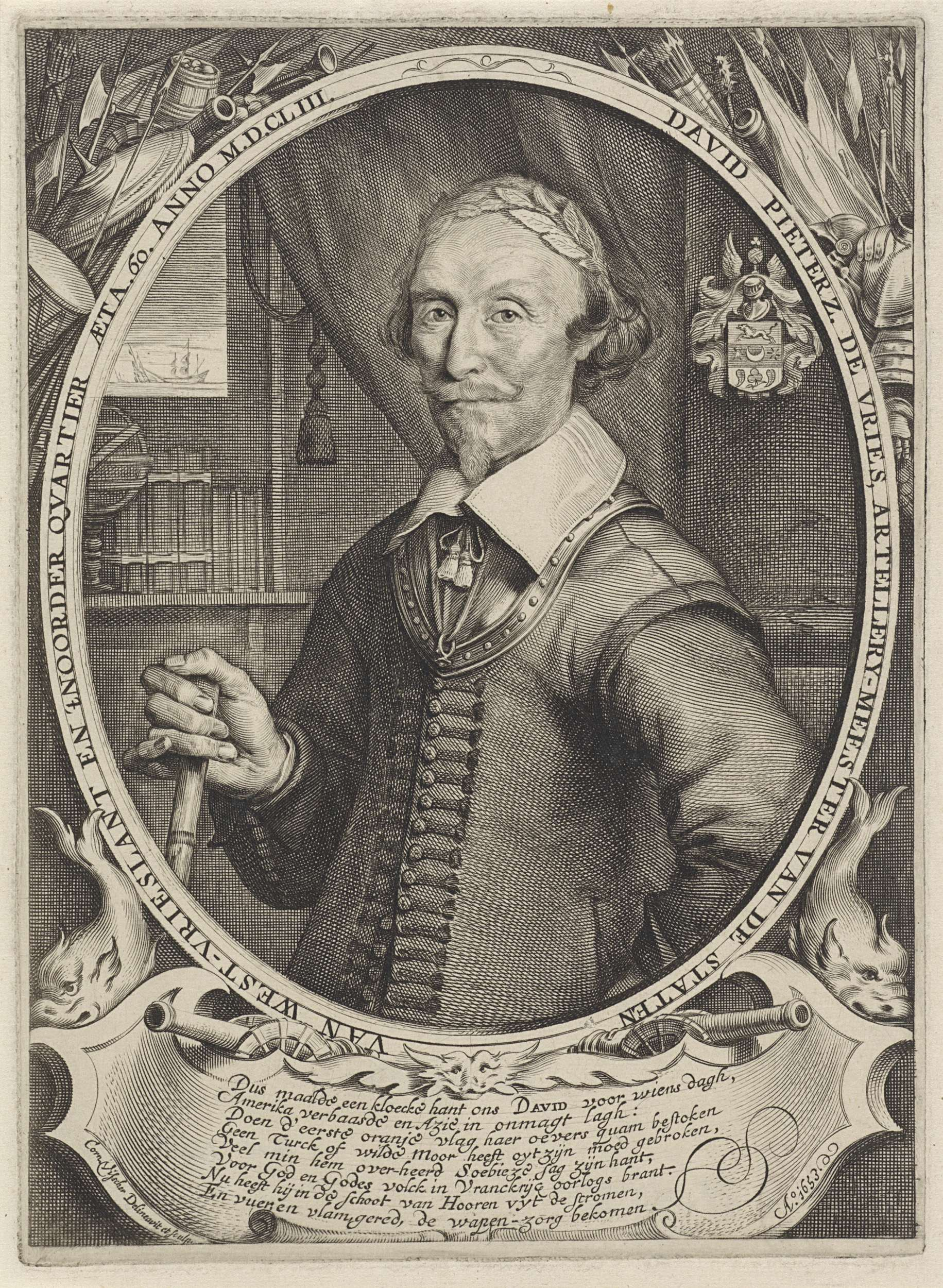
- David Pietersz. de Vries, by Cornelis Visscher.
- Born: 1593
- Died: 13 September 1662 (aged 68–69)
- Occupation: Sailor

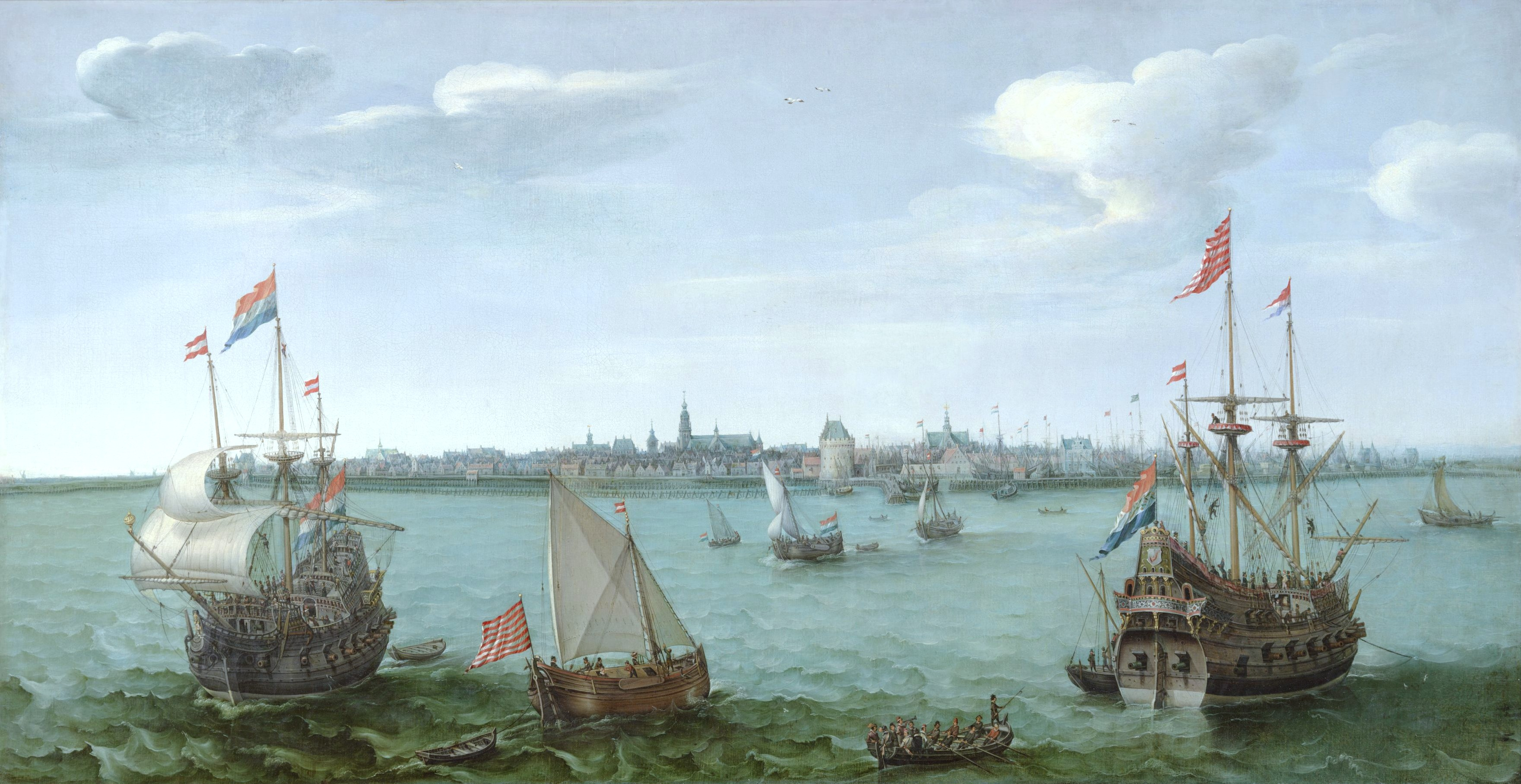
Hoorn in the 17th century

David Pieterszoon de Vries (c. 1593 – 13 September 1655) was a Dutch navigator from the city of Hoorn.

== Biography ==
In 1617, de Vries went on a whaling voyage to Jan Mayen. In 1620, he sailed to Newfoundland, and sold the dried fish in Italy. In Toulon he joined Charles, Duke of Guise. In 1624 he went to Canada again, still in French service. After returning to the Netherlands, the Dutch West India Company put an embargo on his ship. De Vries sold his ship and left for Bayonne.

In 1627, he sailed from Hoorn to Batavia. On board was Jan Pietersz Coen, only recognized during the trip. From the Dutch Indies he sailed to Masulipatnam. In 1629, twenty-eight colonists sailed to North America and planted the Swanendael Colony in Lewes, Delaware, organized for the Dutch West India Company by five merchants from New Amsterdam, who hoped to become patroons of the colony: Kiliaen de Rensselaer, Samuel Godijn, Samuel Blommaert, Albert Burgh, Joannes de Laet and de Vries. Upon visiting the colony in 1632, however, de Vries found that the settlers had been massacred, and their fort burned to the ground.

He returned to North America twice, eventually establishing a settlement on Staten Island (1639), and another, north of Pavonia, known as Vriessendael (1640). In 1636, de Vries built a blockhouse at Signal Hill on Staten Island, the first signal house erected by European settlers in North America and the future site of Fort Tompkins.

De Vries often acted as a mediatory go-between trying to keep the peace between the Lenape and New Netherlands Director-General William Kieft. De Vries famously tried to prevent Kieft from launching the Pavonia Massacre and Massacre at Corlears Hook, which set off the two-year-long Kieft's War. After the massacres, de Vries was influential in bringing the Hackensack Indians sachem Oratam and also the Canarsee sachem Penhawitz to negotiate a truce, which did not hold in the face of Kieft's aggressive policies. De Vries became a leading figure in the popular uprising against Kieft in the Dutch colony which ultimately led to the Director-General's dismissal and recall for trial. Disenchanted by the New Netherlanders' treatment of the indigenous population, he left his farm at Vriessendael in October 1643 in the wake of the Pavonia Massacre, and returned to Holland.

== Work ==
- De Vries, David Pietersen de. Voyages from Holland to America, A.D. 1632 to 1644.
