= Samuel Godin =

Dutch merchant (1566–1633)

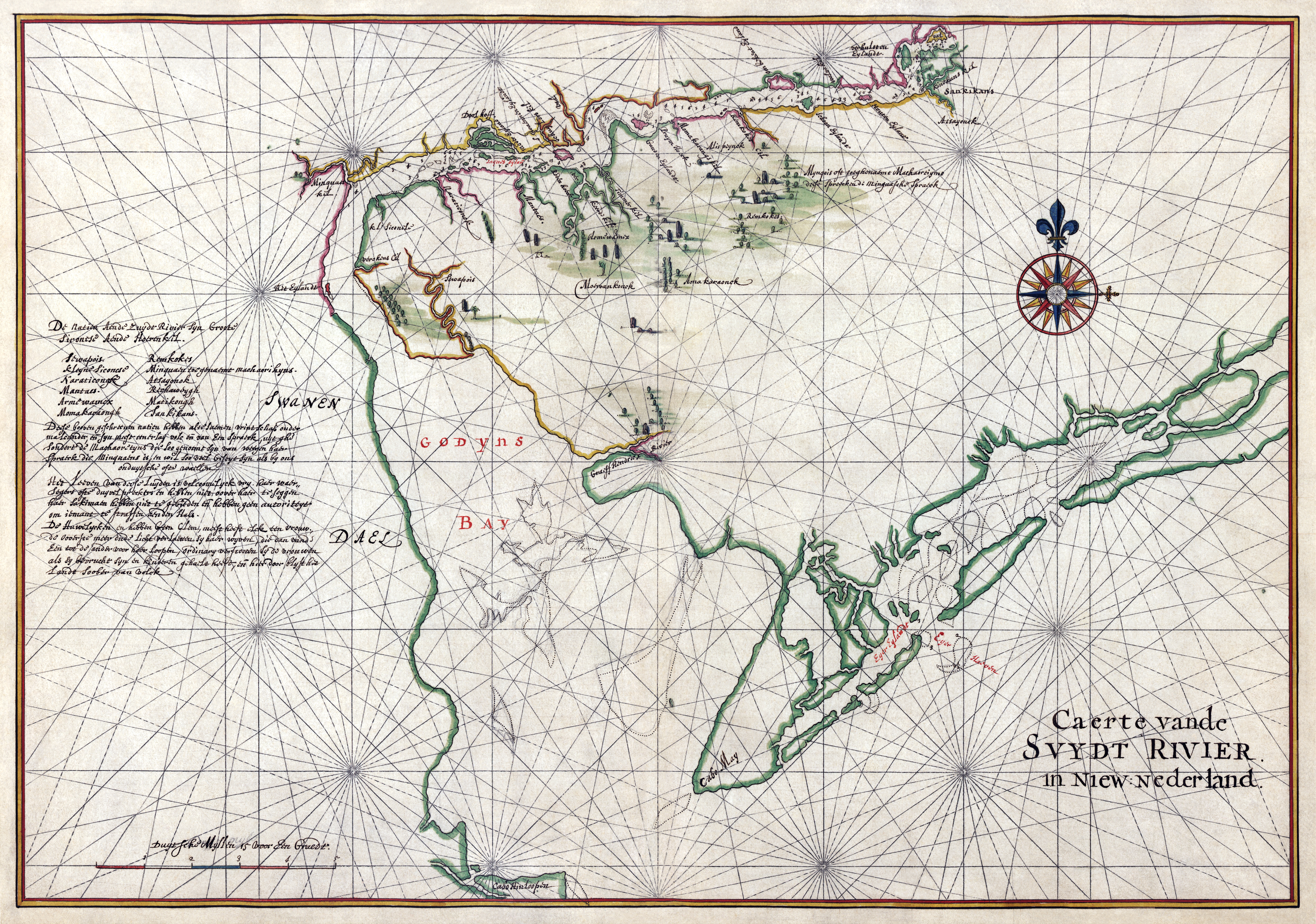
Nautical chart of the Dutch colony Zwaanendael and Godyn's Bay (Delaware Bay), 1639

Samuel Godin, Godyn or Godijn (1561 or around 1566 in Antwerp – September 29, 1633, in Amsterdam) was a wealthy merchant, originally from the Spanish Netherlands, trading in Spain, Brazil and the Levant. He was one of the administrators of the Noordsche Compagnie, involved in whaling, and of the Dutch West India Company. From 1620 he traded in New Netherland. His name was at first given to the Delaware Bay and he was one of the main investors in Zwaanendael. The colony did not last very long as it was plundered by Native Americans soon after its founding.

== Life ==
In 1595 he was involved in serious legal case with Isaac le Maire and Dirck van Os on behalf of his "father-in-law". In 1597 he seems to have lived in Middelburg. In 1600 he sent a letter to Clusius. On 24 August 1602, Samuel Godijn married Anneken Anselmo in Bremen, born in Antwerp on 8 July 1583. Together with his brother Daniel Godijn, he invested 3,000 guilders in the first subscription for VOC shares in August 1602. Godin traded in wool, indigo from Spain, brazilwood, but around 1619 he became more interested in whaling. Because of the recent troubles with English whalers around Spitsbergen the plan came up to catch whales in the Atlantic, near the North River (today's Hudson). About ten men invested two ships, Godin was one of them. August 1622 he bought a plot on Keizersgracht and settled within a year in a house called De Bruinvis (The Harbour porpoise) or De Walvis (The Whale), either on number 105 or 107.

Because of competition among fellow Dutch fur-traders it seems Samuel Godin and Killian van Rensselaer decided to look around elsewhere. In 1628 Samuel Blommaert was informed about suitable land near Godyn's Bay. In the late 1620s, when a controversy arose within the Dutch West India Company as to whether the emphasis of the company's activities should be placed on the expansion of trade or the acquisition of further colonies, Samuel Godijn was one of four merchants who opted for further colonisation. The others were Blommaert, Albert C. Burgh, and Van Rensselaer. On their behalf the agents bargained with the natives for a tract of land reaching from Cape Henlopen to the mouth of Delaware River, "32 miles long, two miles deep extending from Old Cape Henlopen northward to the mouth of a river." The estate had been further extended, on May 5, 1630, by the purchase of a tract twelve miles square on the coast of Cape May opposite, and the transaction was duly attested at Fort Amsterdam. The patent for this land was probably registered and confirmed on June 1, 1630. Godin and Blommaert started the Zwaanendael Colony. A ship of eighteen guns was fitted out to bring over the colonists and subsequently defend the coast, with incidental whale-fishing to help defray expenses. In December 1630, their ship De Walvis (The Whale) set sail from Texel, with immigrants, food, cattle and whaling implements. The purpose of the settlement was "to carry out the whale fishery in that region, and to plant a colony for the cultivation of all sorts of grain, for which the country is very well suited, and of tobacco." (Journal of de Vries).

A colony of more than thirty souls was planted on Lewes creek, a little north of Cape Henlopen. A palisaded fort was built, with the "red lion, rampant," of Holland affixed to its gate, and the country was named Swaanendael or Zwaanendael Colony. Already in 1628 the water was called Godyn's Bay, now known as Delaware Bay.

A company including, besides the two original proprietors, Kiliaen van Rensselaer, Joannes de Laet, the historian, and skipper David Pietersen de Vries was formed to colonize the tract. When De Vries arrived at Swaanendael he noticed the colony was destroyed and nobody had survived. In July 1633 De Vries was back in Amsterdam. Against orders the skipper had delivered tobacco in England and secretly unloaded furs at Texel, which he had kept during the journey in his cabin.

== Family ==
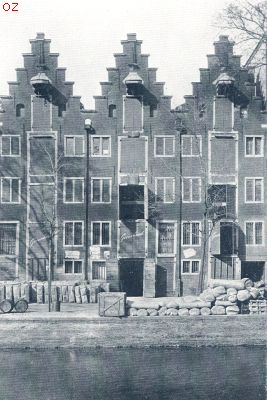
De Groenlandsche pakhuizen (Greenland warehouses) on Keizersgracht 40–44, built in 1621. Godin owned 1/10 of the originally five warehouses

Samuel had three brothers: Philips, Anthony and Daniel; Philips died before 1615 and Anthony lived in Vlissingen. He had eight children. On August 22, 1630, his wife was buried in the Wallonian Church. Samuel Godijn's daughter Cecilia (1607–1637) married Hendrick Trip, 28 years old, on 31 March 1633. Trip was a wealthy trader in copper and armaments. On 20 September 1633, Samuel Godijn was ill and signed a codicil to his testament, dated 13 August 1608. Each son stood to inherit 2,000 guilders, before the division of the estate. His heirs were his son-in-law Hendrick Trip and his daughter Cecilia Godin, and his sons Samuel Godijn (1603-?) the younger (who would inherit the estate in the polder the Beemster). Another daughter, named Johanna (1606–1648), married Jacob Trip, the brother of Hendrick Trip, on 14 February 1634. As both her parents had died, she was assisted by her uncle Daniel Godijn. Godyn's death inventory included several statues, maps, jewels, pearls and paintings.
