= Dutch West India Company =

Dutch chartered company (1621–1792)

- Company flag
- Native name: Geoctrooieerde Westindische Compagnie
- Type: Chartered company
- Founded: 3 June 1621
- Founder: Joannes de Laet
- Defunct: 1 January 1792
- Headquarters: Dutch Republic
- Number of locations: 5 (Amsterdam, Hoorn, Rotterdam, Groningen, and Middelburg)
- Key people: Heeren XIX
- Products: Shipping slaves, administrators, farmers, and soldiers, and returning with salt, beaver skins, silver, sugar, tobacco, coffee, cochineal, campeche, and letterwood

The Chartered West India Company (Dutch: Geoctrooieerde Westindische Compagnie; GWC), also known as the Dutch West India Company (Dutch: West-Indische Compagnie; WIC), was a Dutch chartered company that was founded in 1621 and went defunct in 1792. Among its founders were Reynier Pauw, Willem Usselincx, and Jessé de Forest. On 3 June 1621, it was granted a charter for a trade monopoly in the Dutch West Indies by the Republic of the Seven United Netherlands and given jurisdiction over Dutch participation in the Atlantic slave trade, Brazil, the Caribbean, and North America.

The area where the company could operate consisted of West Africa (between the Tropic of Cancer and the Cape of Good Hope) and the Americas, which included the Pacific Ocean and ended east of the Maluku Islands, according to the Treaty of Tordesillas. The intended purpose of the charter was to eliminate competition, particularly Spanish or Portuguese, between the various trading posts established by the merchants. The company became instrumental in the largely ephemeral Dutch colonisation of the Americas (including New Netherland) in the seventeenth century.

From 1624 to 1654, in the context of the Dutch–Portuguese War, the GWC held Portuguese territory in northeast Brazil, but they were ousted from Dutch Brazil following fierce resistance. After several reversals, the GWC reorganised and a new charter was granted in 1675, largely on the strength in the Atlantic slave trade. This "new" version lasted for more than a century, until after the Fourth Anglo–Dutch War, during which it lost most of its assets.

== Origins ==
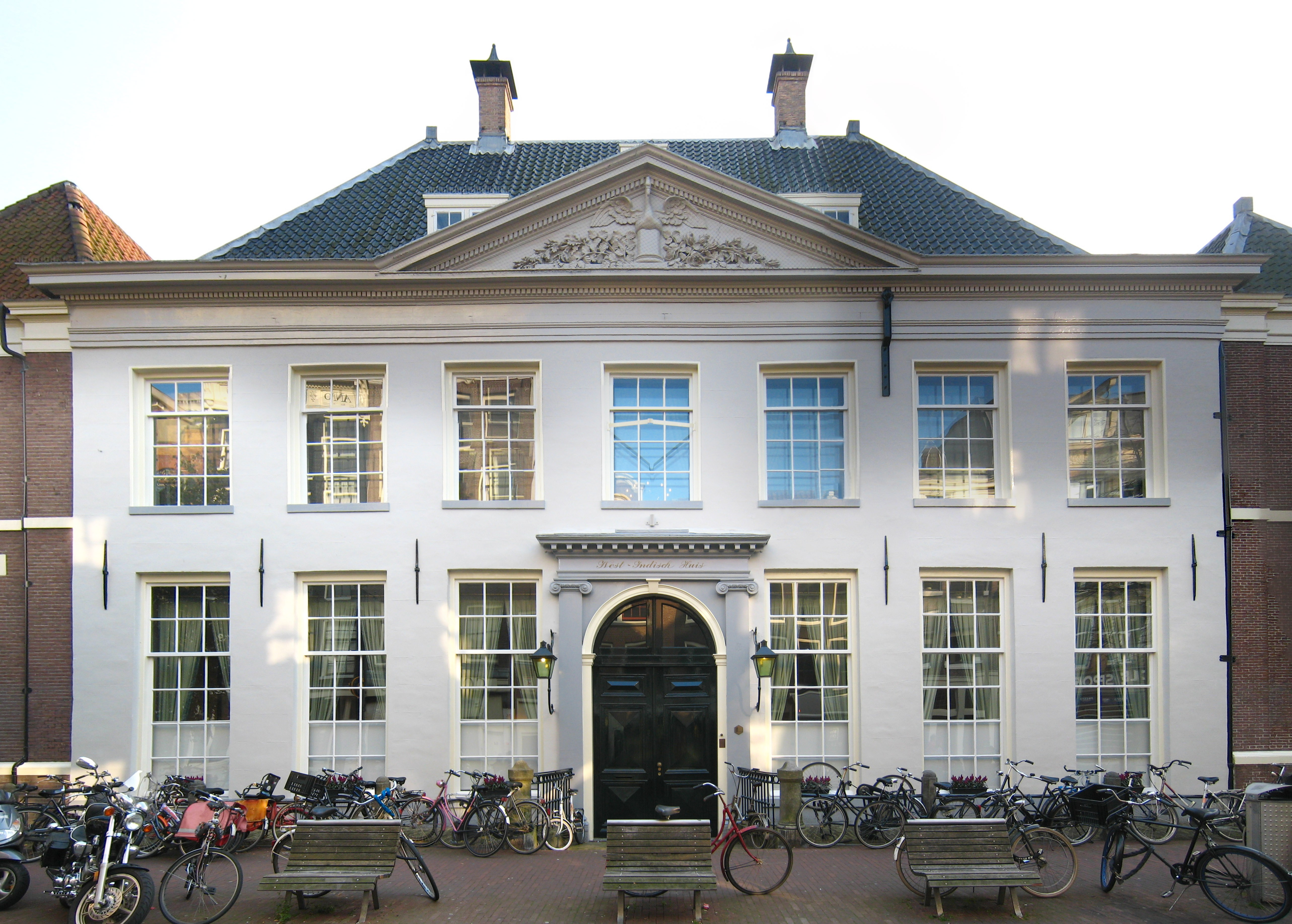
The West India House, headquarters of the Dutch West India Company from 1623 to 1647

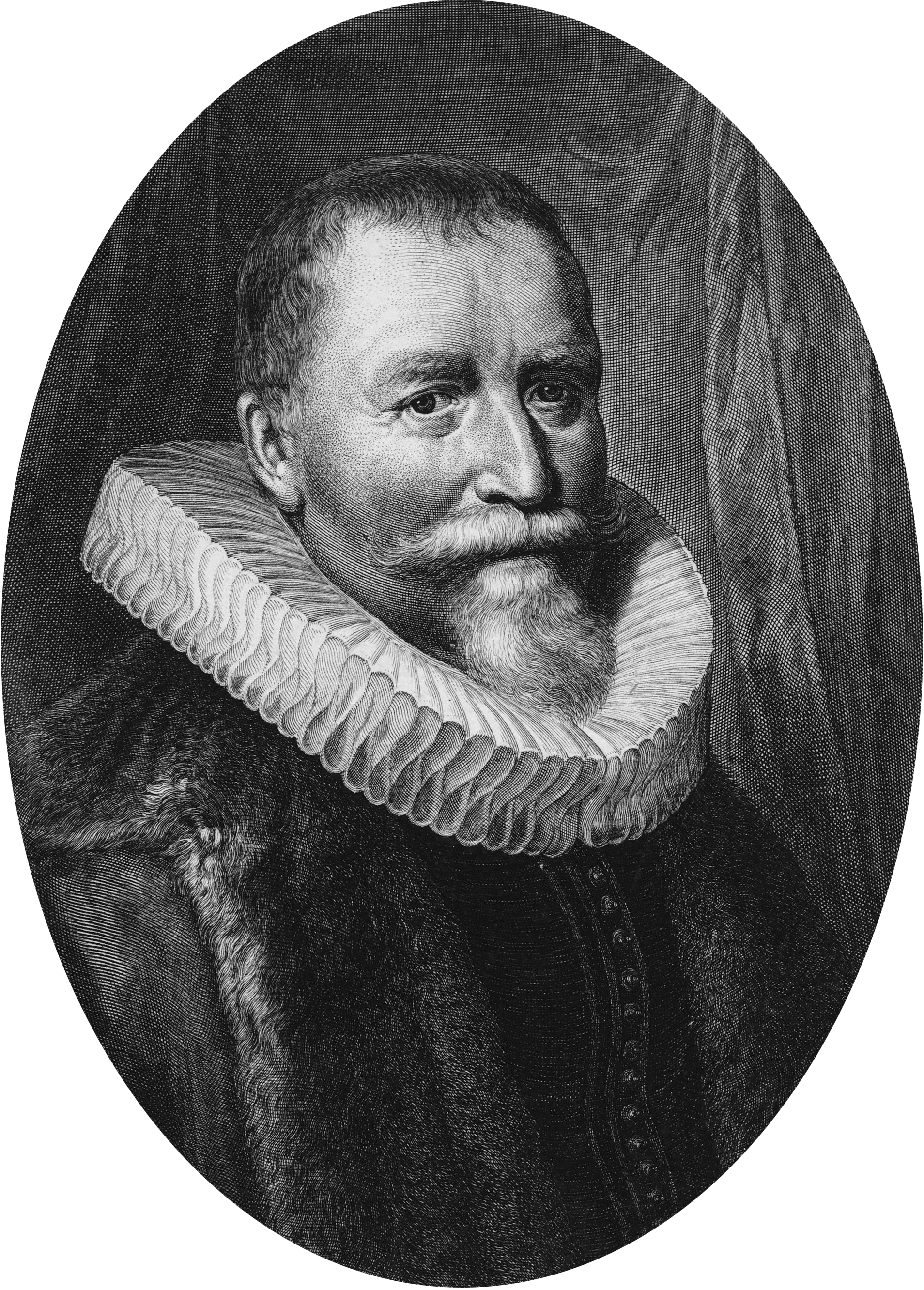
Reinier Pauw, Portrait by Jan Anthonisz. van Ravesteyn

When the Dutch East India Company (VOC) was founded in 1602, some traders in Amsterdam did not agree with its monopolistic policies. With help from Petrus Plancius, a Dutch-Flemish astronomer, cartographer, and clergyman, they sought for a northeastern or northwestern access to Asia to circumvent the VOC monopoly. In 1609, English explorer Henry Hudson, in employment of the VOC, landed on the coast of New England and sailed up what is now known as the Hudson River in his quest for the Northwest Passage to Asia. However, he failed to find a passage. Consequently, in 1615, Isaac Le Maire and Samuel Blommaert, assisted by others, focused on finding a south-westerly route around South America's Tierra del Fuego archipelago in order to circumvent the monopoly of the VOC.

One of the first sailors who focused on trade with Africa was Balthazar de Moucheron. The trade with Africa offered several possibilities to set up trading posts or factories, an important starting point for negotiations. It was Blommaert, however, who stated that, in 1600, eight companies sailed on the coast of Africa, competing with each other for the supply of copper, from the Kingdom of Loango. Pieter van den Broecke was employed by one of these companies. In 1612, a Dutch fortress was built in Mouree (present day Ghana), along the Dutch Gold Coast.

Trade with the Caribbean, for salt, sugar and tobacco, was hampered by Spain and delayed because of peace negotiations. Spain offered peace on condition that the Dutch Republic would withdraw from trading with Asia and America. Spain refused to sign the peace treaty if a West Indian Company would be established. At this time, the Dutch War of Independence (1568–1648) between Spain and the Dutch Republic was occurring. Grand Pensionary Johan van Oldenbarnevelt offered to suspend trade with the West Indies in exchange for the Twelve Years' Truce. He took the proposal of founding a West-India Company off table. The result was that, during a few years, the Dutch sailed under a foreign flag to South America. However, ten years later, Stadtholder Maurice of Orange, proposed to continue the war with Spain, but also to distract attention from Spain to the Republic. In 1619, his opponent Johan van Oldenbarnevelt was beheaded, and when in April 1621 the truce expired, the West Indian Company could be established.

The West India Company received its charter from the States-General in June 1621, granting it a 24-year monopoly on trade and colonisation that included the American coast between Newfoundland and the Straits of Magellan. One of the promotors was Reynier Pauw, who went on to appoint two of his sons as the first managers in 1621; both Pieter and Michiel Reyniersz Pauw were in place for fifteen years. Reynier Pauw II, Cornelis Bicker, and Samuel Blommaert were appointed in 1622.

== Organisation ==
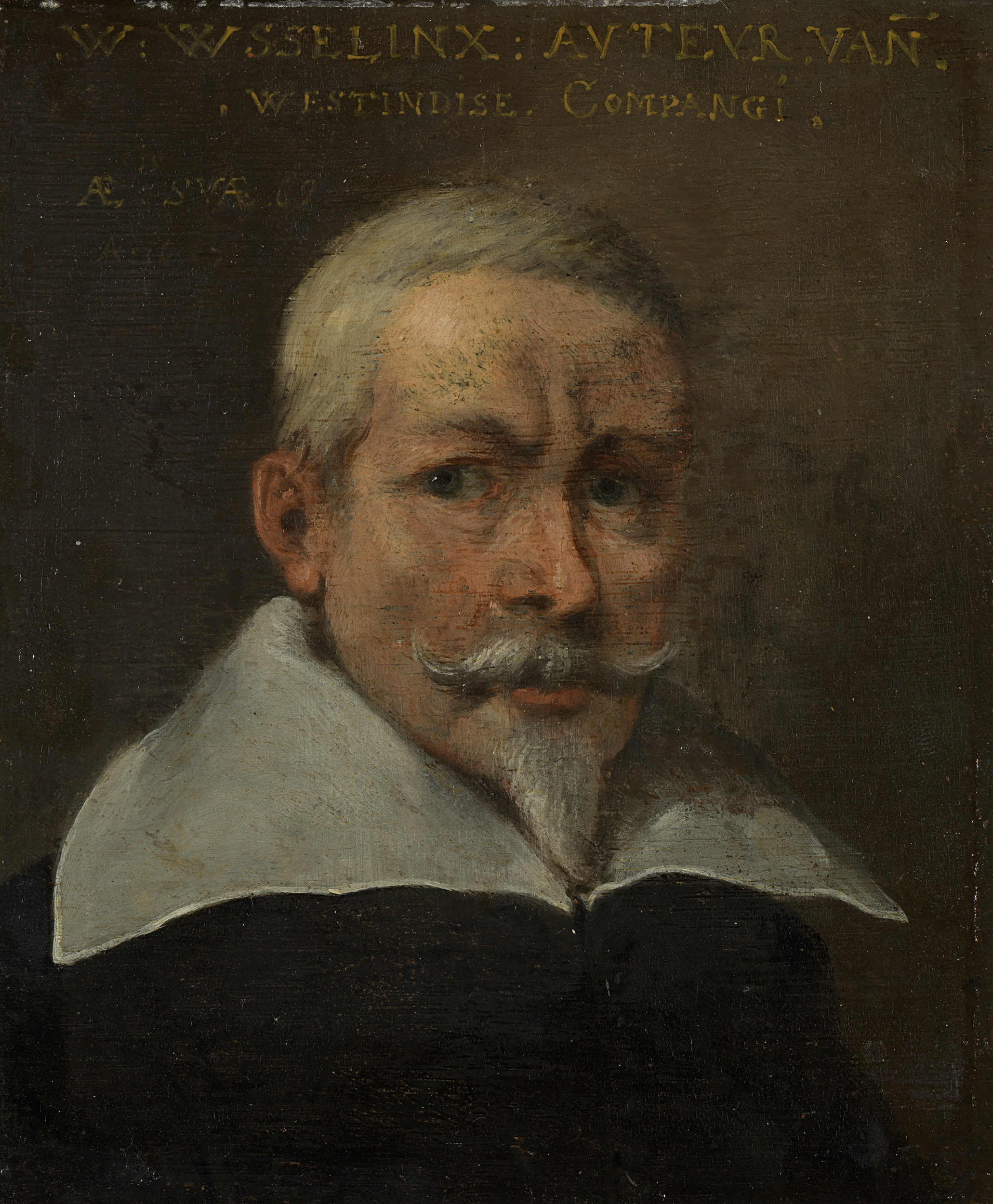
Willem Usselincx, co-founder of the Dutch West India Company

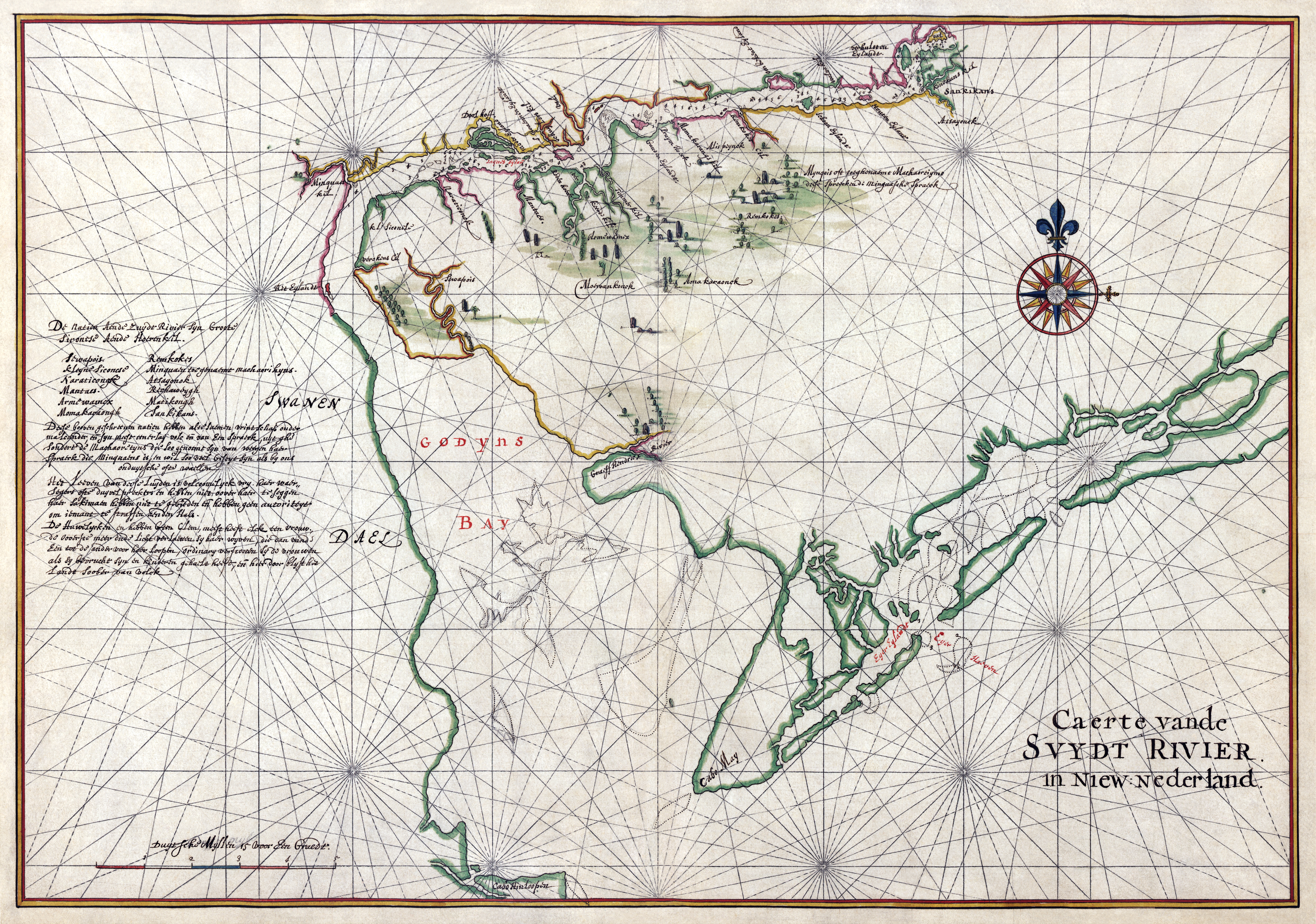
The Zwaanendael Colony along the Delaware

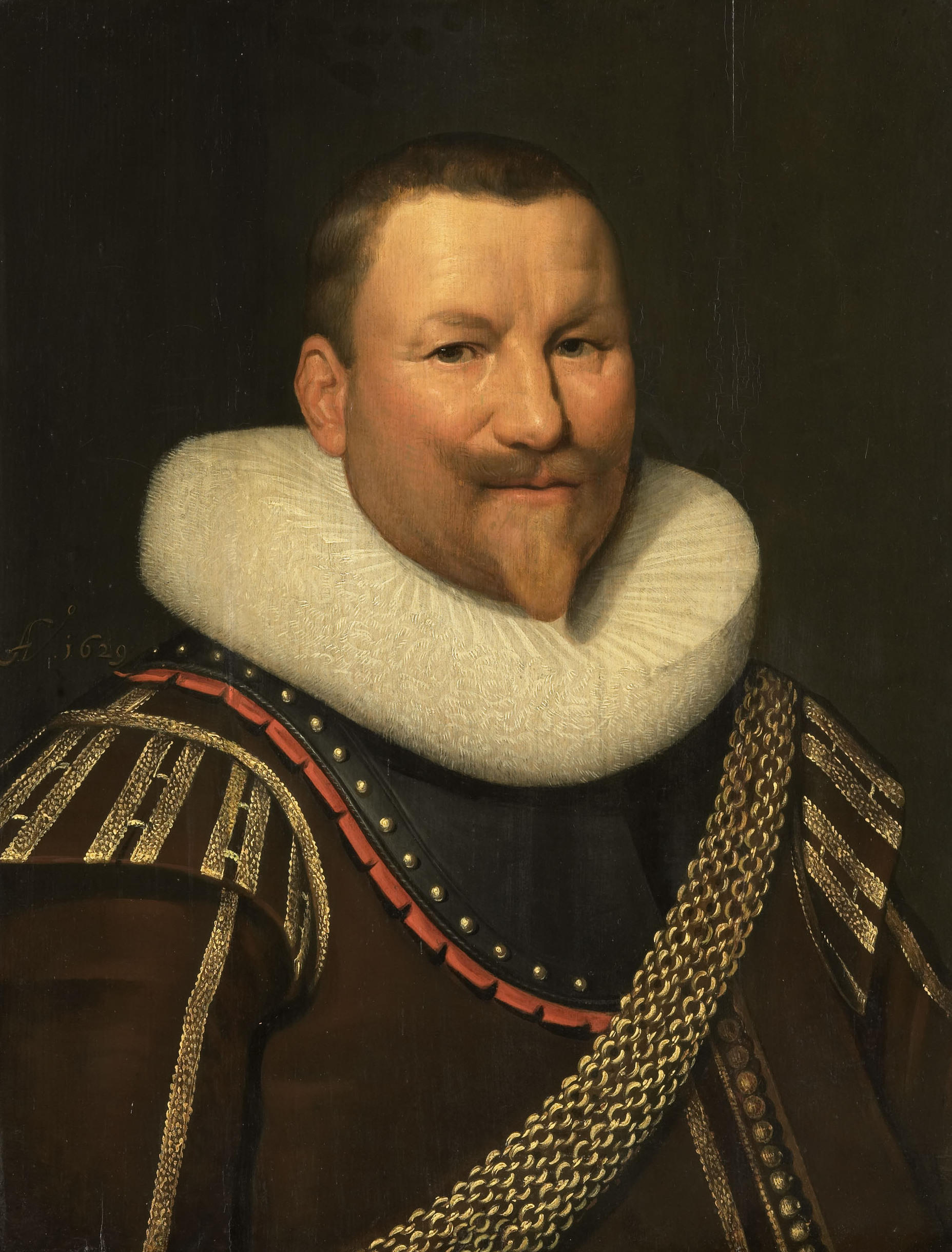
Piet Heyn, GWC admiral who captured the Spanish silver fleet in 1628.

The Dutch West India Company was organised similarly to the Dutch East India Company (VOC). Like the VOC, the GWC had five offices, called chambers (kamers), in Amsterdam, Rotterdam, Hoorn, Middelburg, and Groningen, of which the chambers in Amsterdam and Middelburg contributed most to the company. The board consisted of 19 members, known as the Heeren XIX (the Nineteen Gentlemen, as opposed to the Heeren XVII who controlled the East India Company.) The institutional structure of the GWC followed the federal structure, which entailed extensive discussion for any decision, with regional representation: 8 from Amsterdam; 4 from Zeeland, 2 each from the Northern Quarter (Hoorn and Enkhuizen), the Maas (Rotterdam, Delft, and Dordrecht), the region of Groningen, and one representative from the States General. Each region had its own chamber and board of directors. The validity of the charter was set at 24 years.

Only in 1623 was funding arranged, after several bidders were put under pressure. The States General of the Netherlands and the VOC pledged one million guilders in the form of capital and subsidy. Although Iberian writers said that crypto-Jews or Marranos played an important role in the formation of both the VOC and the GWC, research has shown that initially they played a minor role, but expanded during the period of the Dutch in Brazil. Emigrant Calvinists from the Spanish Netherlands did make significant investments in the GWC. Investors did not rush to put their money in the company in 1621, but the States-General urged municipalities and other institutions to invest. Explanations for the slow investment by individuals were that shareholders had "no control over the directors' policy and the handling of ordinary investors' money", that it was a "racket" to provide "cushy posts for the directors and their relatives, at the expense of ordinary shareholders". The VOC directors invested money in the GWC, without consulting their shareholders, causing dissent among a number of shareholders. In order to attract foreign shareholders, the GWC offered equal standing to foreign investors with Dutch, resulting in shareholders from France, Switzerland, and Venice. A translation of the original 1621 charter appeared in English, Orders and Articles granted by the High and Mightie Lords the States General of the United Provinces concerning the erecting of a West-Indies Companie, Anno Dom. MDCXII. By 1623, the capital for the GWC at 2.8 million florins was not as great the VOC's original capitalisation of 6.5 million, but it was still a substantial sum. The GWC had 15 ships to carry trade and plied the west African coast and Brazil.

Unlike the VOC, the GWC had no right to deploy military troops. When the Twelve Years' Truce in 1621 was over, the Republic had a free hand to re-wage war with Spain. A Groot Desseyn ("grand design") was devised to seize the Portuguese colonies in Africa and the Americas, so as to dominate the sugar and slave trade. When this plan failed, privateering became one of the major goals within the GWC. The arming of merchant ships with guns and soldiers to defend themselves against Spanish ships was of great importance. On almost all ships in 1623, 40 to 50 soldiers were stationed, possibly to assist in the hijacking of enemy ships. It is unclear whether the first expedition was the expedition by Jacques l'Hermite to the coast of Chile and Peru, set up by Stadtholder Maurice with the support of the States General and the VOC.

The company was initially a dismal failure, in terms of its expensive early projects, and its directors shifted emphasis from conquest of territory to pursue plunder of shipping. The most spectacular success for the GWC was Piet Hein's seizure of the Spanish silver fleet, which carried silver from Spanish colonies to Spain. He had also seized a consignment of sugar from Brazil and a galleon from Honduras with cacao, indigo, and other valuable goods. Privateering was its most profitable activity in the late 1620s. Despite Heyn's success at plunder, the company's directors realised that it was not a basis to build long-term profit, leading them to renew their attempts to seize Iberian territory in the Americas. They decided their target was Brazil.

=== Settlements in the Americas ===
There were conflicts between directors from different areas of the Netherlands, with Amsterdam less supportive of the company. Non-maritime cities, including Haarlem, Leiden, and Gouda, along with Enkhuizen and Hoorn were enthusiastic about seizing territory. They sent a fleet to Brazil, capturing Olinda and Pernambuco in 1630 in their initial foray to create a Dutch Brazil, but could not hold them due to a strong Portuguese resistance. Company ships continued privateering in the Caribbean, as well seizing vital land resources, particularly salt pans. The company's general lack of success saw their shares plummet and the Dutch and the Spanish renewed truce talks in 1633.

In 1629, the GWC gave permission to a number of investors in New Netherland to found patroonships, enabled by the Charter of Freedoms and Exemptions which was ratified by the Dutch States General on 7 June 1629. The patroonships were created to help populate the colony, by providing investors grants providing land for approximately 50 people "upwards of 15 years old", per grant, mainly in the region of New Netherland. Patroon investors could expand the size of their land grants as large as 6.5 km (4 mi), "along the shore or along one bank of a navigable river..." Rensselaerswyck was the most successful Dutch West India Company patroonship.

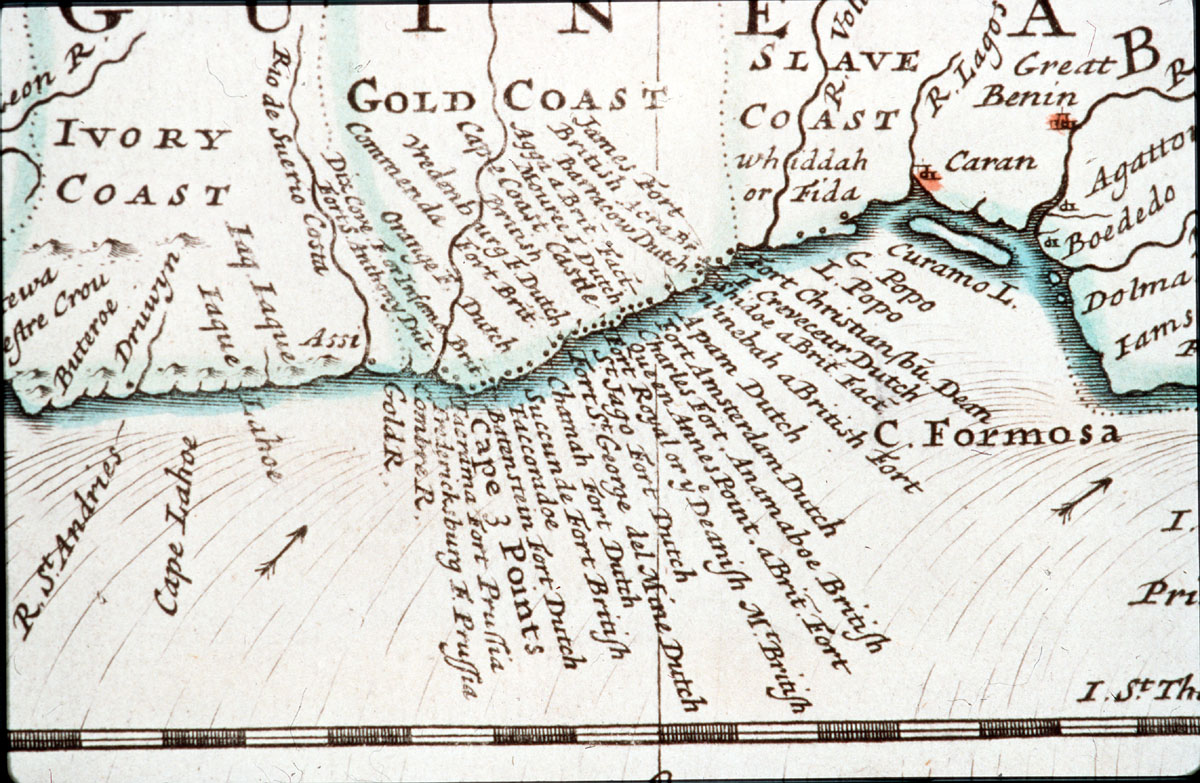
Forts of the Dutch Gold Coast (map circa 1700)

The New Netherland colony, which included New Amsterdam, covered parts of present-day New York, Connecticut, Delaware, and New Jersey, with Manhattan and Fort Amsterdam serving as the first capital. Other settlements were established on the Netherlands Antilles, and in South America; in Dutch Brazil, Suriname and Guyana.

In Africa, posts were established on the Dutch Gold Coast (now Ghana), the Slave Coast (now Benin), and briefly in Dutch Loango-Angola. It was a neo-feudal system, where patrons were permitted considerable powers to control the overseas colony.

In the Americas, fur (North America) and sugar (South America) were the most important trade goods, while African settlements traded the enslaved (mainly destined for the plantations on the Antilles and Suriname), gold, copper, and ivory.

=== Decline ===
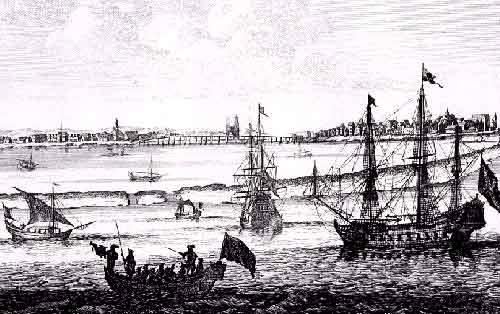
Recife or Mauritsstad – capital of Nieuw Holland

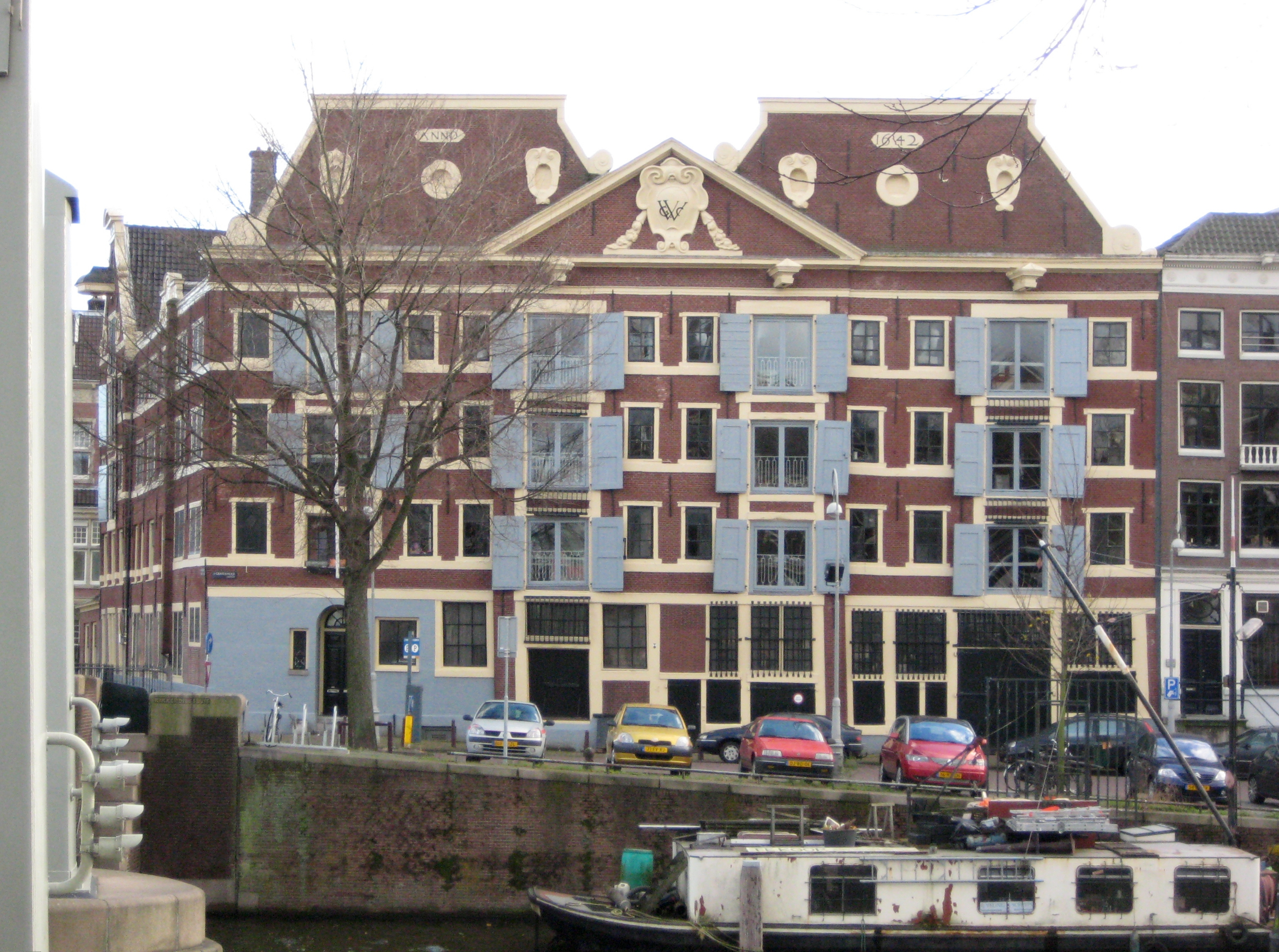
Warehouse of the GWC at Rapenburg

In North America, the settlers Albert Burgh, Samuel Blommaert, Samuel Godijn, and Johannes de Laet had little success with populating the colony of New Netherland, and to defend themselves against local Amerindians. Only Kiliaen Van Rensselaer managed to maintain his settlement in the north along the Hudson. Blommaert secretly tried to secure his interests with the founding of the colony of New Sweden on behalf of Sweden on the Delaware in the south. The main focus of the GWC now went to Brazil.

The GWC managed to conquer parts of Brazil from Portugal in 1630. That same year, the colony of New Holland was founded, with a capital in Mauritsstad (present-day Recife). In the meantime, the war demanded so many of its forces that the company had to operate under a permanent threat of bankruptcy. In fact, the GWC went bankrupt in 1636 and all attempts at rehabilitation were doomed to failure. In 1636, the GWC took possession of Sint Eustatius, Sint Maarten, and Saba which all fell under Dutch control. A commander was stationed on St. Eustatius to govern all three islands by 1678.

Because of the ongoing war in Brazil, the situation for the GWC in 1645, at the end of the charter, was very bad. An attempt to compensate the losses of the GWC with the profits of the VOC failed because the directors of the VOC reclined. In 1645, the main participants in the GWC were members of the Trip family. Merging the two companies was not feasible. Amsterdam was not willing to help out, because it had too much interest in peace and healthy trade relations with Portugal. This indifferent attitude of Amsterdam was the main cause of the slow, half-hearted policy, which would eventually lead to losing the colony. In 1647, the company made a restart using 1.5 million guilders, capital of the VOC. The States General took responsibility for the warfare in Brazil.

=== Reformation ===
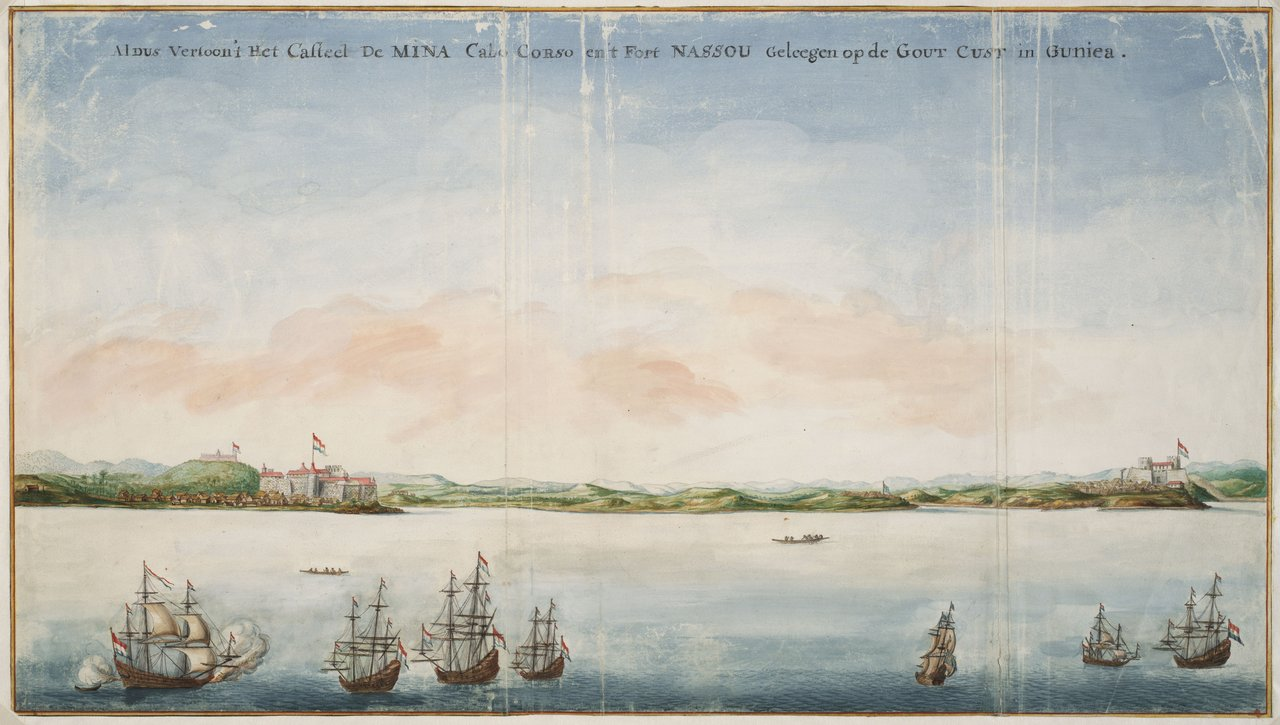
Painting by Johannes Vingboons of both Elmina Castle and Fort Nassau, Ghana (ca 1665)

Becauseof the Peace of Westphalia, the attacks on Spanish shipping were forbidden to the GWC. The Portuguese succeeded in the recapture of Angola. Many merchants from Amsterdam and Zeeland decided to work with marine and merchants from the Holy Roman Empire, Denmark–Norway, England, and other European countries. In 1649, a competing Swedish Africa Company was founded; the GWC obtained a monopoly on gold and enslaved Africans with the kingdom of Accra (present-day Ghana). Elmina Castle was the main port. In 1654, the Dutch were thrown out of Brazil after the recapture of Recife. In 1656, the company signed the Treaty of Butre (Dutch Gold Coast). In 1659, the Danish West India Company, an undercover Dutch enterprise, was founded. In 1660, the Royal African Company was founded, led by the Duke of York.

In 1662, the GWC obtained several asiento subcontracts with the Spanish Crown, under which the Dutch were allowed to deliver 24,000 enslaved Africans. The GWC made Curaçao a centre of the Atlantic slave trade, bringing slaves from West Africa to the island, before selling them elsewhere in the Caribbean and Spanish Main. The influence of the GWC in Africa was threatened during the Second and Third Anglo–Dutch Wars, but English efforts to displace the Dutch from the region ultimately proved unsuccessful.

The first West India Company suffered a long agony, and its end in 1674 was painless. The reason that the GWC could drag on for 27 years seems to have been its valuable West African possessions, due to its slaves.

== Second West India Company ==
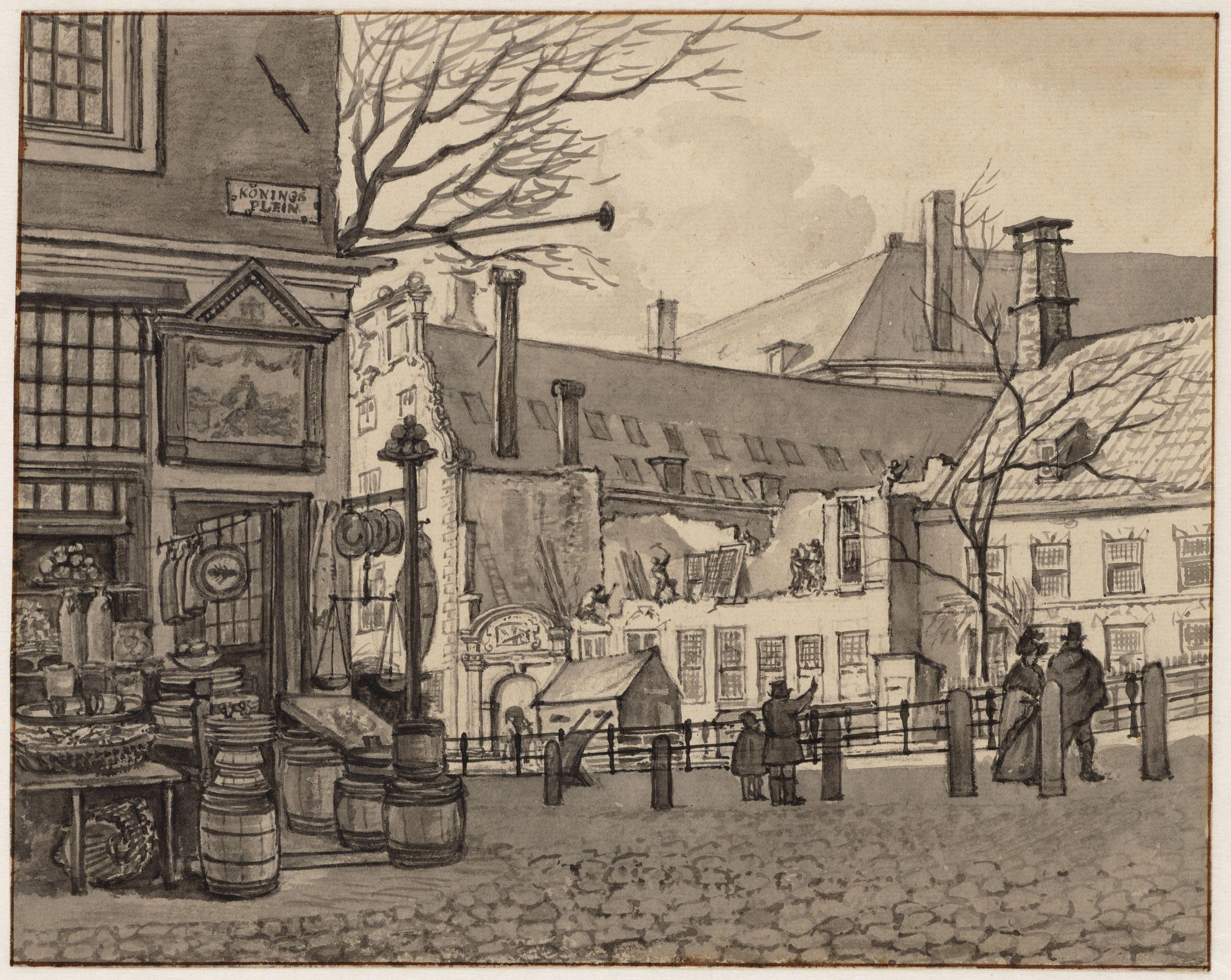
Gerrit Lamberts (1776–1850), the demolition of the West India House in 1817

When the GWC could not repay its debts in 1674, the company was dissolved. But due to continued high demand for trade between West Africa and the Dutch colonies in the Americas (mainly slave trade), a second West India Company known as the New West India Company was chartered that same year. This new company controlled the same trade area as the first but privateering was no longer an asset. All ships, fortresses, etc. were taken over by the new company. Nobody was fired, but the number of directors was reduced from 19 to 10, and the number of governors from 74 to 50. By 1679, the new GWC had slightly more than 6 million guilders which was largely supplied by the Amsterdam Chamber. In 1687, due to the asiento possessed by Balthasar Coymans, the company paid the highest dividend.

From 1694 until 1700, the GWC waged a long conflict against the Eguafo Kingdom along the Gold Coast, present-day Ghana. The Komenda Wars drew in significant numbers of neighbouring African kingdoms and led to the replacement of the gold trade with enslaved Africans. Calabar was the largest slave trading place in Africa. Sint Eustatius (Dutch Caribbean) became the most profitable asset of the GWC and a transit point for enslaved Africans in the Atlantic slave trade. After 1734 the GWC was primarily engaged in facilitating the slave trade, and only responsible for the supply of slaves until 1738. The company then began to outsource the slave trade and left it to private enterprise, especially in Middelburg, Zeeland.

In 1750, Thomas Hope was elected to the board of the company, but preferred the Heren XVII after two years; he was succeeded by Nicolaas Geelvinck in 1764. In 1773, when drinking coffee and cocoa was popular almost everywhere, the family Van Aerssen van Sommelsdijck sold its property in the colony of Surinam. The GWC participated in a bigger share together with the Society of Suriname. Many planters in Surinam and the Caribbean came into financial trouble because of the mortgages (crisis of 1772); the demand for slaves dropped. In 1775, the last slave ship entered the port of Willemstad.

After the Fourth Anglo-Dutch War (1780–1784), it became apparent that the GWC was no longer capable of defending its own colonies, as Sint Eustatius, Berbice, Essequibo, Demerara, and some forts on the Dutch Gold Coast were rapidly taken by the British. From 1780 on, the company made losses and paid no dividend. In 1781, the annual production of the Essequibo and Demerara colonies was 10,000 okshoofden (2.3m liters) of sugar, 5 million ponden (2.5k metric tonnes) of coffee, and 800,000 ponden (395 metric tonnes) of cotton.

In 1791, it was decided not to renew the patent to the GWC and to dissolve the company. All stocks were sold and territories previously held by the GWC came under the rule of the States General of the Netherlands. A directorate Ad-Interim took over the administration. A Council of Colonies was established as administrator over the affairs of the GWC until 1795.

Around 1800, there was an attempt to create a third West India Company, but without success.

== See also ==
- List of Dutch West India Company trading posts and settlements
- Atlantic slave trade
- Curaçao
- Charter of Freedoms and Exemptions
- Dutch colonisation of the Americas
- Dutch West Indies
- Dutch–Portuguese War
- Economic history of the Netherlands (1500–1815)
- List of director generals of New Netherland
- New Holland (Acadia)
