= Achttienhoven, South Holland =

Achttienhoven
- Hamlet
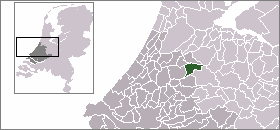

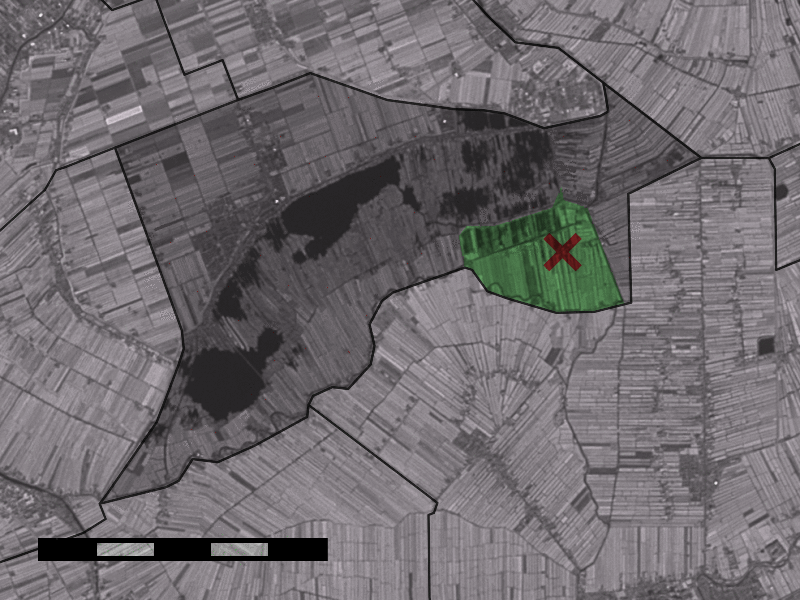
- The hamlet (dark red) and the statistical district (light green) of Achttienhoven in the municipality of Nieuwkoop.
- Coordinates: 52°8′48″N 4°51′25″E
- Country: Netherlands
- Province: South Holland
- Municipality: Nieuwkoop

Population
  - Total: 140
- Time zone: UTC+1 (CET)
  - Summer (DST): UTC+2 (CEST)

Achttienhoven is a hamlet in the Dutch province of South Holland. It is a part of the municipality of Nieuwkoop, and lies about 7 km north of Woerden.

The statistical area "Achttienhoven", which also includes the surrounding countryside, has a population of around 130.

Between 1817 and 1855, Achttienhoven was a separate municipality, sometimes called "Achttienhoven en de Bosch".

The nature reserve De Haeck lies northwest of the hamlet.
