= Maryn Adriansen =

Early American settler (1600 – c. 1654)

Maryn Adriansen (1600 – c. 1654) (also spelled Maryn Adriaensen, Marinus Adriaensz, Marijn Adriaensz, Marin Adriaensz, Marinus Ariaens) was an early settler to New Netherland. Originally emigrating under an indenture agreement he later became a prominent member of society. His conflict with the governor led to accusations and, eventually, acquittal. He owned property in New Amsterdam and a large plantation at Awiehaken.

== Background ==
Maryn Adrieansen was born in Holland in 1600, and he came from Veere, in the Province of Zeeland. He was a boatswain from 1621 to 1627 under Captain Claes Gerritssen Compaen. He married Lysbet Thyssen around 1628 and may have been in New Amsterdam as early as 1630 where an unnamed son was born. He had a daughter around 1631, either in the Netherlands or Renssalaerswyck, Brechje Maryns, who would marry Claes Cornelisze Egmont Van Voorhout and have issue. He died sometime before March 1654, and his widow, Lysbet Thysen, remarried Geerlief Michelsen.

== Rensselaerwyck ==
Adriansen contracted with Kiliaen van Rensselaer to serve as a tobacco planter for the period of three years on January 12, 1631. He sailed with his wife Lysbet Thysen and a child and a few farm workers from Texel aboard De Eendracht shortly after July 7, 1631. He arrived at Fort Orange, part of the patroon of Rensselaerwyck, located on the Hudson River (in today's Capital District near Albany, New York. His indenture was for a period of three years for half of 4 guns, 8 axes, 4 adzes, 12 spades, to fl.74,10. In 1632 he was named schepen. As his name does not appear later in the colony's accounts, he likely left at the end of his term in 1634.

== New Amsterdam ==
Adriaensen engaged in the North River (Hudson River) trade, establishing himself near the present-day Pearl and Wall streets in New Amsterdam and purchased a house in the Smit's Vly (along the shores of the East River at the foot of today's Maiden Lane).

On August 29, 1641, he was elected a member of Director of New Netherland Willem Kieft's advisory board, the Twelve Men. In 1643, he took part in a Shrovetide dinner meeting at the home of Jan Jansen Damen, with other guests including Kieft, Cornelis van Tienhoven and Abraham Isaacsen Verplanck During dinner, the men discussed the Indian situation and Van Tienhoven produced a petition advocating the massacre of the Native American population. All those in attendance signed the document and Kieft agreed. The Pavonia Massacre took place, February 25–26. Eighty Native Americans were brutally massacred. Kieft ordered Adriaensen and a band of volunteers to go to Corlaers Hook to attack the refugees assembled there. Forty of the tribe, men, women and children, were killed in the Massacre at Corlears Hook. Retaliation was swift, and the colonists suffered greatly that winter from Native American attacks during what is known as Kieft's War.

Adriaensen, realizing that Kieft intended to shift public blame to him, went to Kieft armed with a loaded pistol and cutlass and demanded "What devilish lies are these you've been telling about me?". Counsellor La Montagne grappled for the pistol, which misfired without causing injury. Meanwhile, Robert Pennoyer, one of the company's soldiers, drew Adriaensen's sword from its scabbard and flung it away. (Pennoyer later testified in regard to the matter, on the 23d of March 1643; that he had heard Adriaensen's wife Lysbet Tyson say in the tavern after he had asked her twice what ailed her, "Robert, my husband, will kill the commander; go and catch him"). Adriaensen was overpowered and jailed but under pressure from Adriaensen's followers, Kieft agreed to return Adriaensen to Amsterdam for trial. Bound in chains, Adriaensen was put on board a ship sailing for Holland, where he was acquitted. and afterwards returned.

== Weehawken ==
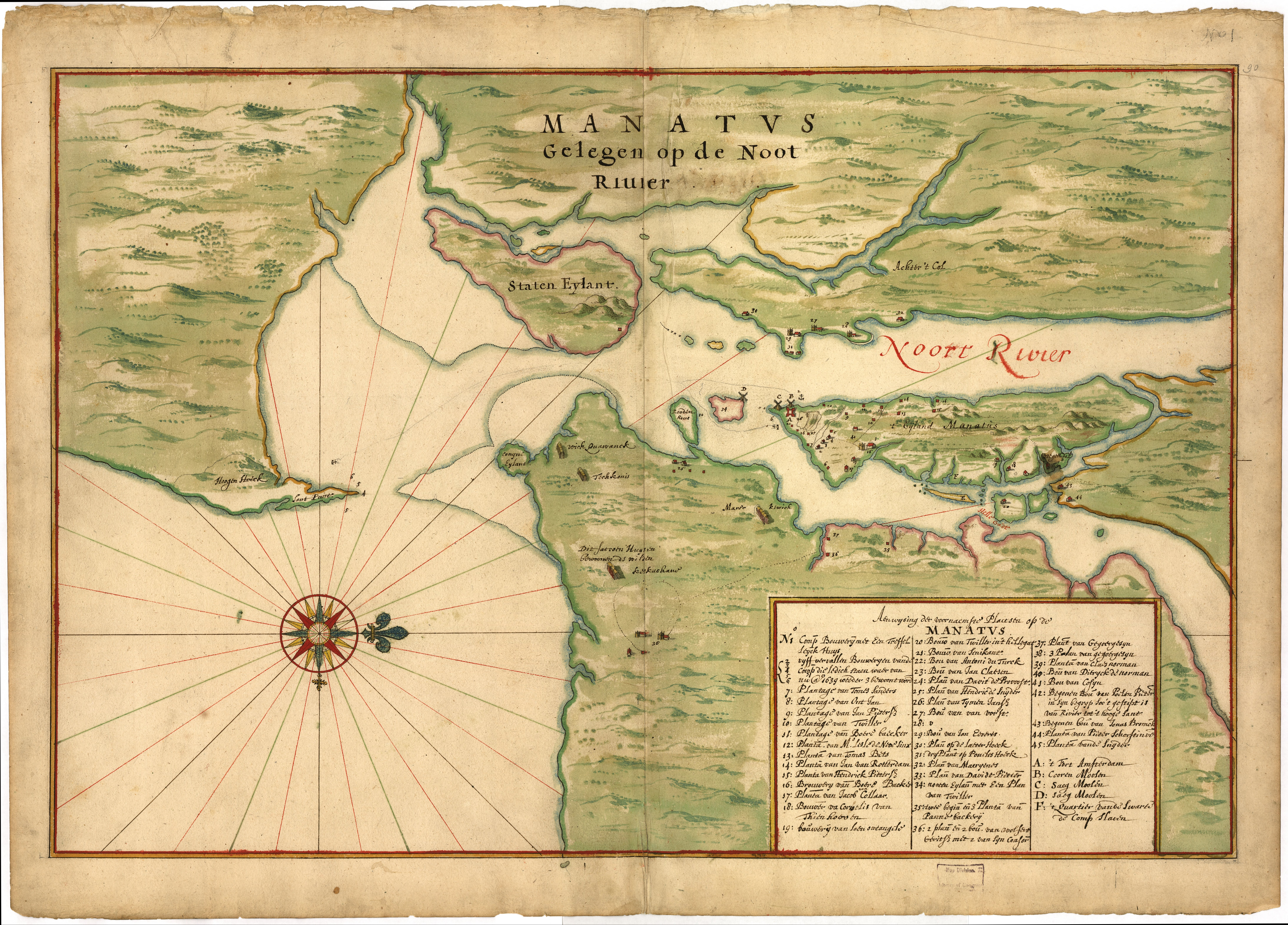
Map (c1639) Manhattan situated on the North Rivier with numbered key showing No. 32, the "plantation of Maerynes".

Bergen, along the Hudson and Hackensack rivers, that would become contemporary Hudson and Bergen counties. Though it only officially existed as an independent municipality from 1661, with the founding of a village at Bergen Square, Bergen began as a factorij at Communipaw circa 1615 and was first settled in 1630 as Pavonia, with settlements at Harsimus, Paulus Hook, Hoboken and Vriessendael were in the following years. They were along the banks of the North River (Hudson River) across from New Amsterdam, under whose jurisdiction they fell.

Maryn Adriansen acquired land on the west bank of the Hudson. The Manatus Map of 1639 depicts a land holding numbered 32 and described as the "plantation of Maerynes". At some point Adriaensen returned to New Netherland some years and on May 11, 1647, Director Kieft granted him patent for 50 morgens of land on the west side of the North River, known by the name of "Awiehaken", now Weehawken

On April 18, 1670, the government of the Province of New Jersey (posthumously) confirmed the grant to Maryn Adriaensen for a parcel of land called Wiehacken in the jurisdiction of Bergen on Hobooken Creek, 50 morgen Dutch measure originally given on May 11, 1647.

== See also ==
- Eendracht (1615 ship)
- Hackensack tribe
- Michael Reyniersz Pauw
- Jan Everts Bout
- Walling Van Winkle
- Nine Men
- Eight Men
- Pavonia Massacre
