= Manatus Map =

1639 map of New Netherland

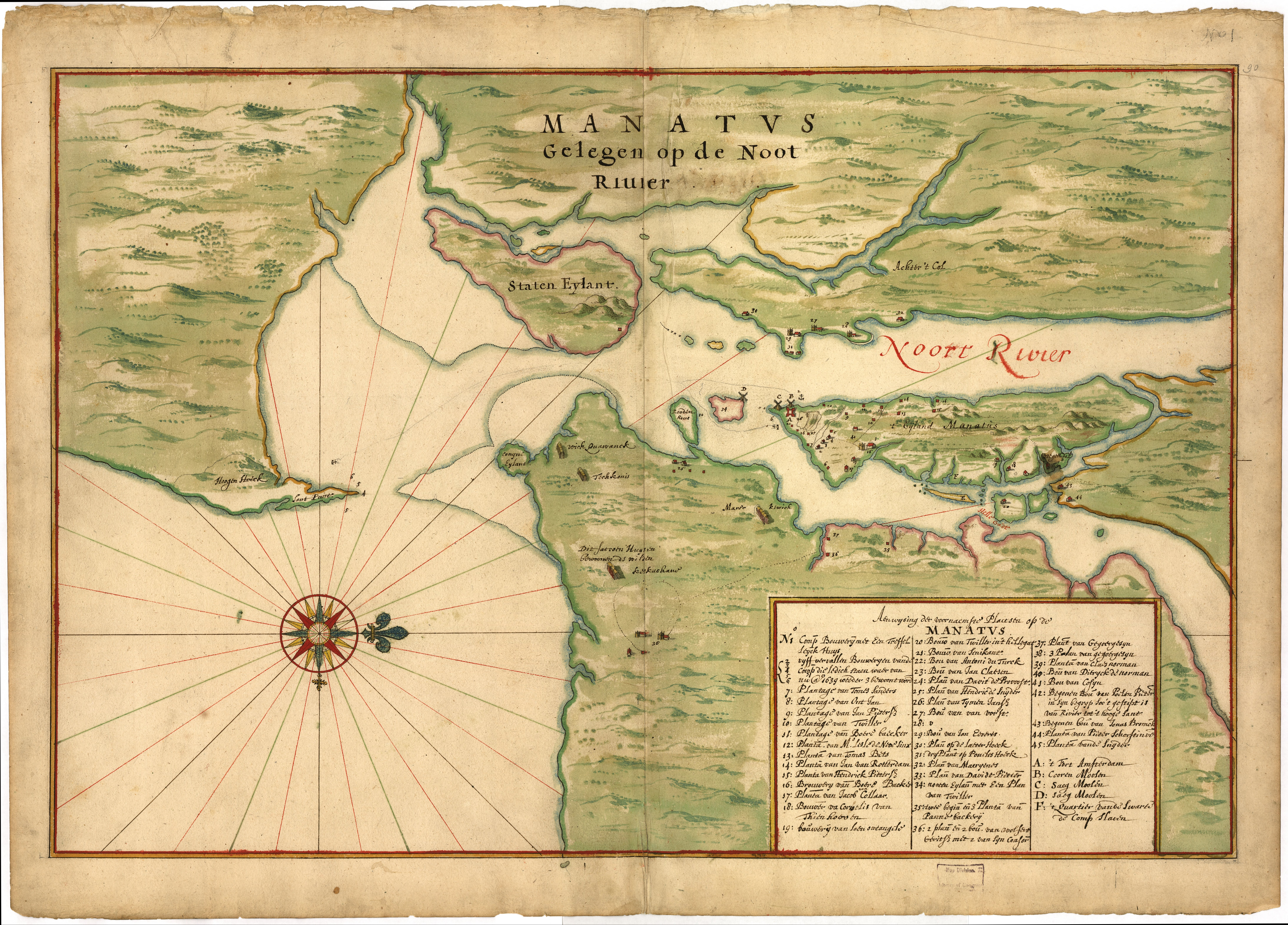
Harrisse/LOC copy of the Manatus Map of 1639

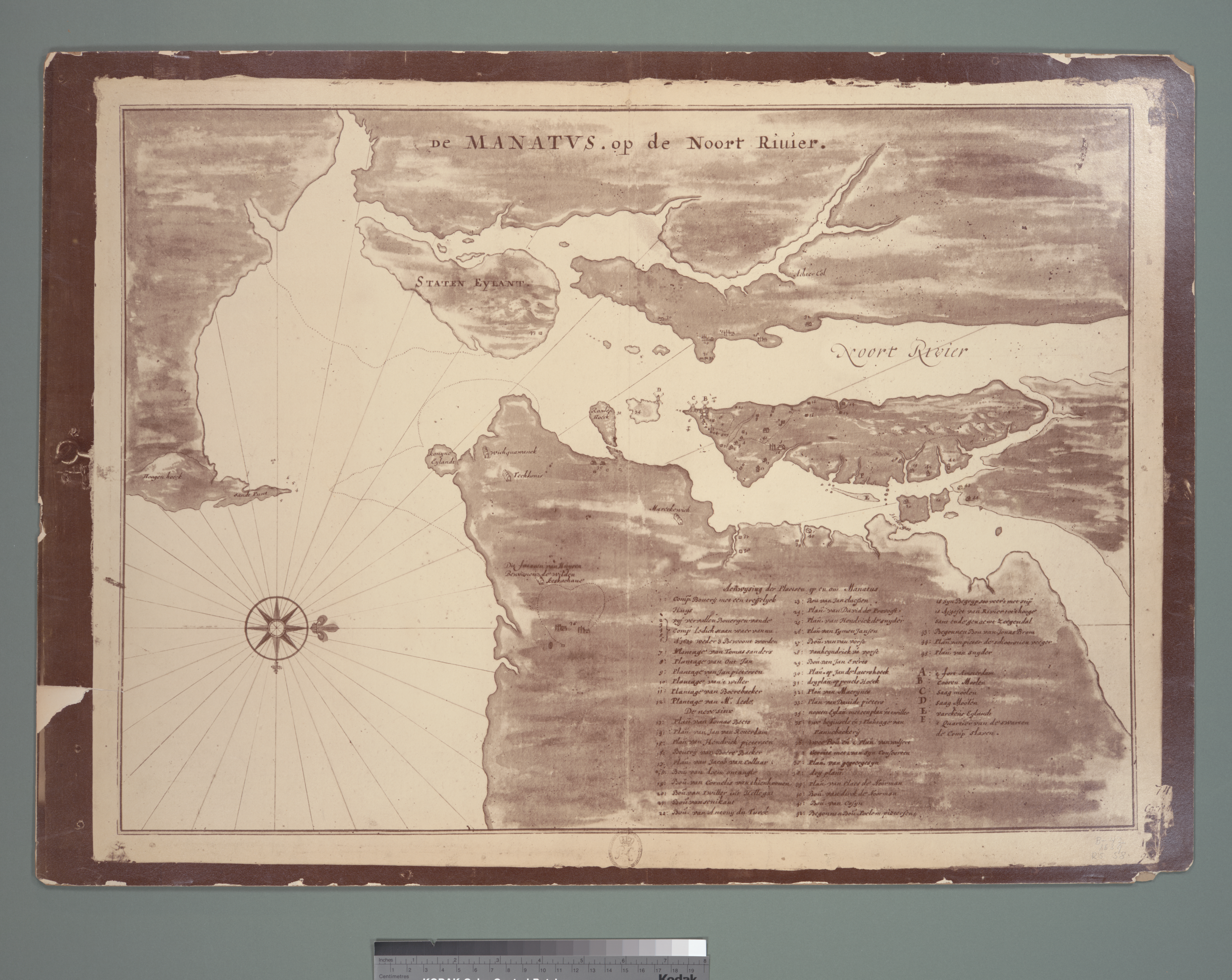
Villa di Castello copy of the map.

The Manatus Map is a 1639 pictorial map of the New York–New Jersey Harbor Estuary at the time the area was part of the colony of New Netherland. Entitled Manatvs gelegen op de Noort Rivier (Manhattan situated on the North River) it shows the geographic features of the region, as well as New Amsterdam and other New Netherland settlements. The map was drafted when Willem Kieft was Director of New Netherland.

The authorship of the map is uncertain. Edward Van Winkle of the Holland Society of New York attributed it to the Dutch cartographer Johannes Vingboons, who made many manuscript maps for the Dutch West India Company (a.k.a. GWC or WIC). Isaac Newton Phelps Stokes did not exclude any of several candidates except for Andries Hudde, due to travel back to Europe for his marriage in that year.

The original drawing is lost and It survives only in two later 17th-century copies made in the same studio with slight differences, as noted in Stokes' The Iconography of Manhattan Island. One of the copies came from the same collection as the Castello Plan at Villa di Castello, and is now held at the New York Public Library. The other was a Henry Harrisse donation to the Library of Congress. The Harrisse copy is twenty-six and five-eighth inches by eighteen and one-fourth inches in size.

The map is oriented with north to the right with New York Bay and North River (Hudson River), the Noort Rivier, at the center. It shows Manhattan Island, Manatus Eylandt, with Westchester and Bronx counties to the north; a good part of Long Island and Coney Island (Conyni Eylant in Harrisse or Konyne Eylandt in Castello) to the east; Sandy Hook (Sant Punt) and Hoogen Hoeck to the south; with Staten Island (Staten Eylant), Achter t' Col, Newark Bay, the Hackensack and Passaic river and Overpeck Creek, to the west. Also identified are Native American settlements in present-day Brooklyn.

== Inset Key ==
Depicted in Manhattan situated on the North Rivier and explained in a numbered key to the main places in an inset are the properties of the company (Dutch: Westindische Compagnie or WIC) and early New Netherlanders. Some were bouweries, or homesteads which included dwellings and out buildings, and others were plantages, or plantations, sometimes worked by company slaves.

- 1. Bowery Number One - Company bouwerie with an excellent house (for the Director of New Netherland)
- 2-6. Five dilapidated company bouweries which were empty; as of 1639 three were occupied. (Note: WIC bouweries 2-6 were leased for a period of six years.) Previous occupants included:
  - 2. Peter Bijvelt
  - 3. Wilfert Gerritsz
  - 4. Gerrit Theusz de Reux and Johan Ydes
  - 5. Jacob Wallich van Winkle and Claes Cornelissen Swits
  - 6. Geurdt van Gelderland; later Cornelius Jacobus Stille a.k.a. Wortendyke
- 7. Thomas Sanders; previously Evert Focken and Rutger Hendrixsen van Soest
- 8. Plantation of Olf Jan (Jan Seals)
- 9. Plantation of Jan Pietersma Slot
- 10. Tobacco plantation of Wouter van Twiller
- 11. Plantation of Edward Fiscock a.k.a. Boer Baecker (en: Farmer Baker)
- 12. Plantation of Lesle de Neve
- 13. Plantation of Thomas Bets (Beecher)
- 14. Plantation of Jan van Rotterdam
- 15. Plantation of Hendricks Pietersma
- 16. Brewery of Edward Fiscock a.k.a. Boer Baker
- 17. Plantation of Jacob van Collaer
- 18. Bouwerie of Cornelis van Tienhoven
- 19. Bouwerie of Jean Mousnier de la Montagne a.k.a. Dr.Johannes La Montagne) (Muscoota)
- 20. Bouwerie of Wouter van Twiller at Hell Gate
- 21. Bouwerie of the Senikant [sic] Predicant Dominie Bogardus
- 22. Bouwerie of Anthony van Salee (a.k.a. Anthony the Turk)
- 23. Bouwerie of Jan Clarence
- 24. Plantation of David Provoost
- 25. Hendrick Hendricksen Kip a.k.a. Hendrick the Tailor; later Jan Dame
- 26. Plantation of Thymen Jansen
- 27. Bouwerie of Cornelius van Vorst
- 28. v: Plantation of van Vorst at Hoboken leased for the brewery of Aert van Putten
- 29. Bouwerie of Evertsen
- 30. Plantation at Lacher's Hook (Caven Point)
- 31. Three company plantations at Paulus Hook
- 32. Plantation of Maerytensen
- 33. Plantation of Pieter De Vries (Vriesendael)
  - Unnumbered plantation on Staten Island also established by De Vries
- 34. Noten (Nut) Island including a plantation of Twitter
- 35. Two beginning plantations of Pannebacker
- 36. Two plantations and two bouweries of Gerrittsz with two of his cohort (Achervelt)
- 37 & 38. Four plantations of Gegoergstyn, later Joris Jansen Rapelje
- 39. Plantation of Claes Norman
- 4o. Bouwerie of Dirk Volkerson a.k.a. Dirk the Norman
- 41. Bouwerie of Cosyn van Putten
- 42. Beginnings of bouwerie of Jochem Pietersen Kuyter a.k.a. Poule Pieztr (Zegendael) - in his understanding it is oriented from the river to the high ground
- 43. Beginnings of bouwerie of Jonas Bronck
- 44. Plantation of Pieter Schorstinveger
- 45. Plantation of Hendrick Hendricksen Kip a.k.a. Hendrick the Tailor
- A. Fort Amsterdam
- B. Grain Mill
- C. Sawmill
- D. Sawmill
- F. Quarter of the Blacks/Company slaves

== See also ==
- Castello Plan
- Cartography of New York City
