= Jochem Pietersen Kuyter =

Colonist of New Netherland

Jochem Pietersen Kuyter (died 1654) was an early colonist to New Netherland, and one of the first settlers of what would become Harlem on the island of Manhattan. He became an influential member of the community and served on the citizen boards known as the Twelve Men, the Eight Men and the Nine Men.

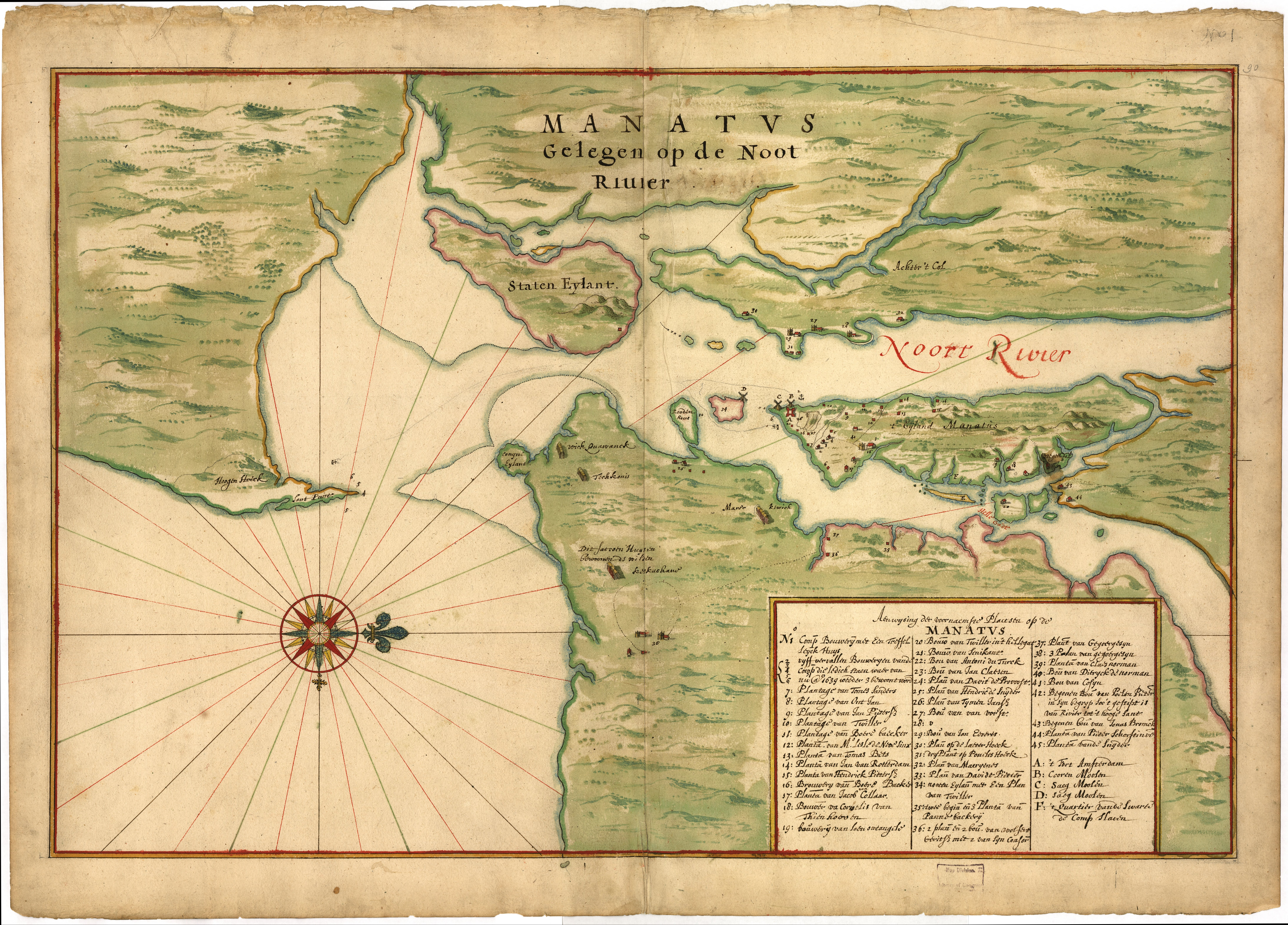
Map (c1639) Manhattan situated on the North Rivier with numbered key showing settlements with 42 representing the Zegendael homestead. #43, across the Harlem River represents that of Bronck settled the land on the Bronx side of the river.

Kuyter was a native of Dithmarschen, now part of Germany, and a Dane by birth. According to tradition, he had been in the service of the Danish East India Company and the Dutch East India Company. In a joint venture with Jonas Bronck, Kuyter mounted an expedition to settle in New Netherland aboard a ship they had hired, "De Brandt van Troyen" (The Fire of Troy). He arrived at the port of New Amsterdam in July, 1639. Kuyter settled with his farmers and herdsmen upon a tract of 400 acres (160 ha; 0.63 sq mi) of fine farming land, of which he had obtained a grant from the Dutch West India Company. The homestead named Zedendaal, or Blessed Valley, stretched along the Harlem River from about the present 127th Street to 140th Street. Kuyter was married to Lentie Martens, who possibly was a sister of his friend and partner, the aforementioned Jonas Bronck. They had no children. In March 1644, the house was burned downed, presumably by the indigenous population who rampaged across the colony in response to attacks at Pavonia and Corlear's Hook.

None of the other Danes in New Amsterdam obtained the social prestige of Kuyter. He was a member of the Board of Twelve Men from August 29, 1641, to February 18, 1642; of the Board of Eight Men which board existed from September, 1643, to September, 1647. After a journey to Holland he was made a member of the Board of Nine Men, which existed from September 25, 1647, until the city was incorporated, in 1653, when he was made schout (sheriff).

Kuyter twice came in conflict with the Director of New Netherland. Kuyter was a man of good education, as evidenced by his dealings with Willem Kieft, who he believed damaged the colony with his policies and the start of Kieft's War in 1643. In 1647, when Peter Stuyvesant arrived in New Amsterdam to replace Kieft, Kuyter and Cornelis Melyn acting in name of the citizens of New Amsterdam, brought charges against the outgoing governor, demanding an investigation of his conduct while in office. Recognizing the danger of such actions to his own administration, Stuyvesant refused to consider Melyn and Kuyter's demands and caused them to be tried for lèse majesté. The case was quickly decided against the defendants, who were sentenced to banishment from the colony. On August 16, 1647, Kuyter and Melyn sailed aboard the Princess Amelia to appeal their convictions to the States-General. Their vessel ran aground off the coast of Wales, but both survived and were able to present their cases in early 1648. The States-General acted favorably upon their appeal and issued a writ of mandamus dated April 28 ordering Director-General Stuyvesant to appear in person, or through his representative, to sustain his judgment against them.

In 1651, Kuyter sold three-fourths of land and cultivated the remaining portions. He was killed by Lenape in 1654. Before his death, the Directors in Amsterdam recommended to Stuyvesant that he appoint Kuyter as New Amsterdam's schout.
