= Abraham Isaacsen Verplanck =

Early settler in New Netherlands

Abraham Isaacsen Verplanck (1606–1690), also known as Abraham Isaacse Ver Planck, (Note: Abraham Verplanck, Abraham Isaacsen Ver Planck, Abraham Isaacsen Ver Planken, Abram I. Ver Plank and Abraham Isaacsen Ver Planck.) was an early and prominent settler in New Netherlands. A land developer and speculator, he was the progenitor of an extensive Verplanck family in the United States. Immigrating circa 1633, he received a land grant at Paulus Hook (in today's Jersey City) in 1638.

He was one of the driving forces behind the bloody Kieft's War against the Native American population, set off by their retaliation to the Dutch's 1643 Pavonia massacre. His losses were so great at Pavonia he was forced to mortgage his Paulus Hook plantations.

A property owner on a smaller scale on Manhattan for the remainder of his life, he died with outstanding debt, settled by his family in 1699 by sale of one of his holdings.

== Family ==
Coat of Arms of Abraham Isaacsen Verplanck

Verplanck was the son of Isaac Ver Planck, born in Edam in Dutch Republic (Republiek der Zeven Verenigde Nederlanden) in 1606.

He married Maria de la Vigne in 1632. His children were Abigael Van Lear (1635–1672), Gulian (c. 1636 – 1684), Callyntje(1639–1708), Isaac (b. 1641), Susanna (b. 1642), Jacomyntjie (b. 1644), Ariantje (b. 1646), Hillegondt (1648–1724) and Isaac (1651–1729).

Some of his children relocated to what has become known as the Capital District of New York. He died at Albany, New York in 1690.

He was the father of merchant, fur trader, and land grant applicant Gulian Verplanck (c. 1636 - 1684), whose widow Henrica inherited a one-third interest of the expansive Rombout Patent in today's southern Dutchess County, New York. His daughter Callyntje, sometimes spelled Catharina, married David Pieterse Schuyler.

== Paulus Hook ==
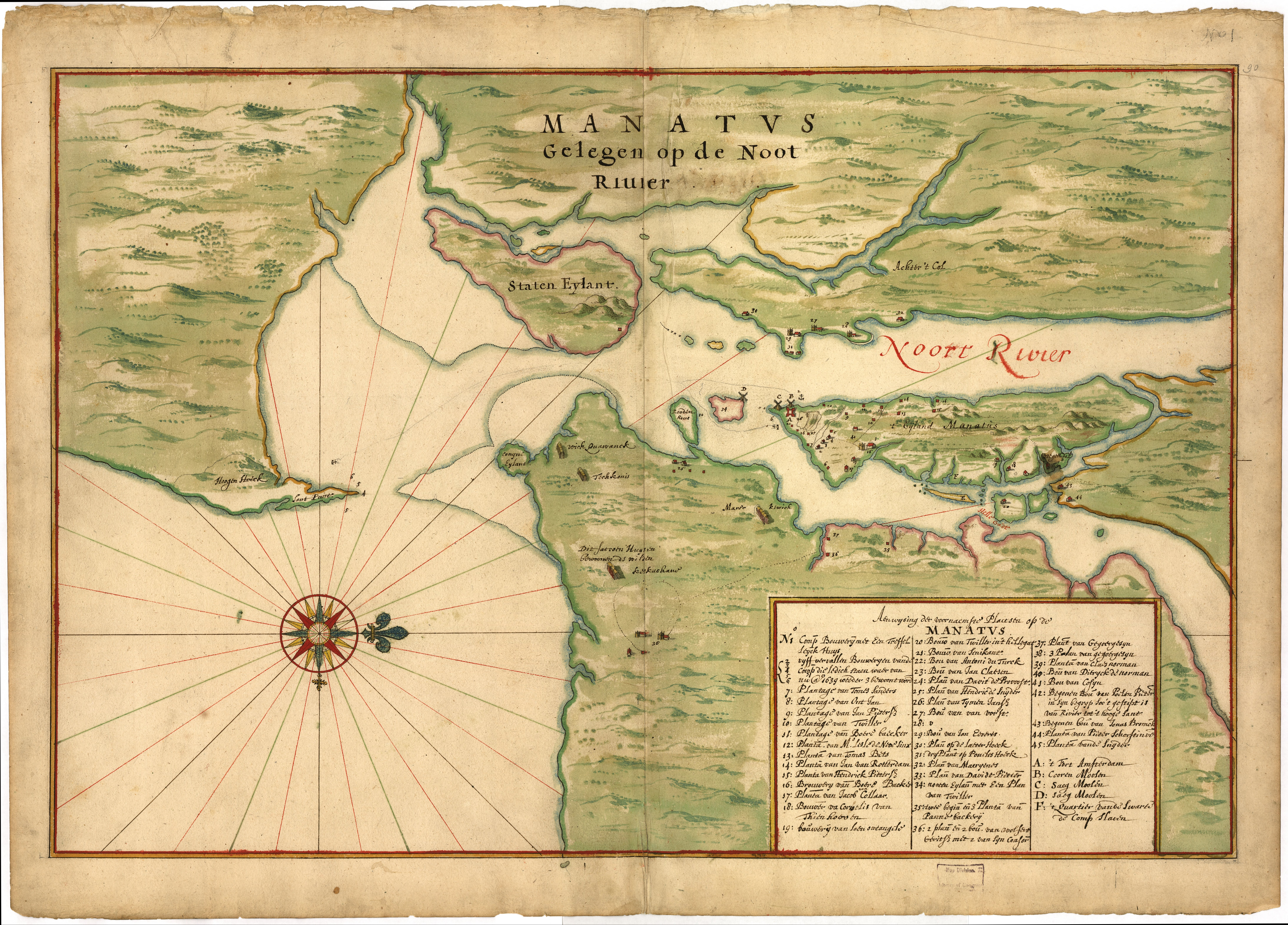
Map (c1639) Manhattan situated on the North Rivier with numbered key showing No. 31, three plantations at Paulus Hook

Bergen, along the west bank Hudson River and Bergen Hill would become contemporary Hudson County, New Jersey. Though it only became independent municipality from 1661 with the founding of a village at Bergen Square, Bergen began as a factorij at Communipaw circa 1615 and was first settled in 1630 as Pavonia, with settlements at Harsimus, Paulus Hook, Hoboken, and Vriessendael in the following years. They were along the banks of the North River (Hudson River) across from New Amsterdam, under whose jurisdiction they fell.

In 1630, Michiel Reyniersz Pauw purchased two tracts from the Lenape Hackensack tribe: Hopoghan Hackingh (Hoboken) and Ashasimus (Harsimus), covering the entire peninsula between the Hudson River and Hackensack River now known as Hudson County, New Jersey (and later a third purchase of Staten Island.) The patroonship (established under the Charter of Freedoms and Exemptions) was given the Latinized form of his surname (which means "peacock"), Pavonia. It is said it was sold to him by the Manhattans after they had retreated there after the sale of their home island to Peter Minuit some years before. Pauw failed to fulfill the other conditions set forth by the Dutch West India Company (WIC) (which included populating the area with at least 50 adults) and was later required to sell his interests back to it.

The area was an island at high tide. In 1638, an agent/superintendent for the WIC, a man named Michael Paulez (Pauluson, Powles) was assigned to the land. He built a hut, operated an occasional ferry and traded with the local native population. His name was eventually anglicized to Paulus, and given to the hook jutting into the river and bay.

By permission of Director of New Netherland Willem Kieft, Verplanck acquired land at Paulus Hook on May 1, 1638. The Manatus Map of 1639 depicts a land holdings in the nascent province; number 31 is described as the "plantations at Paulus Hook".

== Twelve Men and "Kieft's War" ==
On August 29, 1641, he was elected a member of Director of New Netherland Willem Kieft's advisory board, the Twelve Men. In 1641, his relationship with the director was so contentious that he was threatened with banishment if he continued to insult the company's officers. The following year Kieft disbanded the council because it disagreed with his military ambitions.

In 1643, Verplanck took part in a Shrovetide dinner meeting at the home of Jan Jansen Damen, with other guests including Kieft, Cornelis van Tienhoven and Maryn Adriansen. During dinner, the men discussed the Indian situation and Van Tienhoven produced a petition advocating the massacre of the Native American population. All those in attendance signed the document and Kieft agreed. The Pavonia Massacre took place, February 25–26. Eighty Native Americans were brutally massacred. Kieft ordered Adriaensen and a band of volunteers to go to Corlaers Hook to attack the refugees assembled there. Retaliation was swift, and the colonists suffered greatly that winter from Native American attacks during what is known as Kieft's War, which lasted until 1646.

Verplanck's losses were so great in the Pavonia action that he was forced to mortgage his property to Jan Damen and Tienhoven, to serve as security for a loan from the Dutch West India Company, which he did on April 27, 1643.

== New Amsterdam ==
In 1643, Kieft's War forced the Verplancks to seek the safety of Fort Amsterdam on Manhattan Island where they later bought a lot from brother-in-law Van Tienhoven near the present-day Pearl and Wall Street in New Amsterdam and later purchased a house in the Smit's Vly (along the shores of the East River at the foot of today's Maiden Lane) and in 1649 built a house there.

In 1664, when the English fleet appeared in the Upper New York Bay to claim the colony, Verplanck was one of the signers of the petition requesting that Peter Stuyvesant surrender. Sometime after February 27, 1699, a parcel of land having belonged to Verplanck, located on King Street in Manhattan was sold by his heirs, apparently to settle his estate.

== Rombout Patent ==
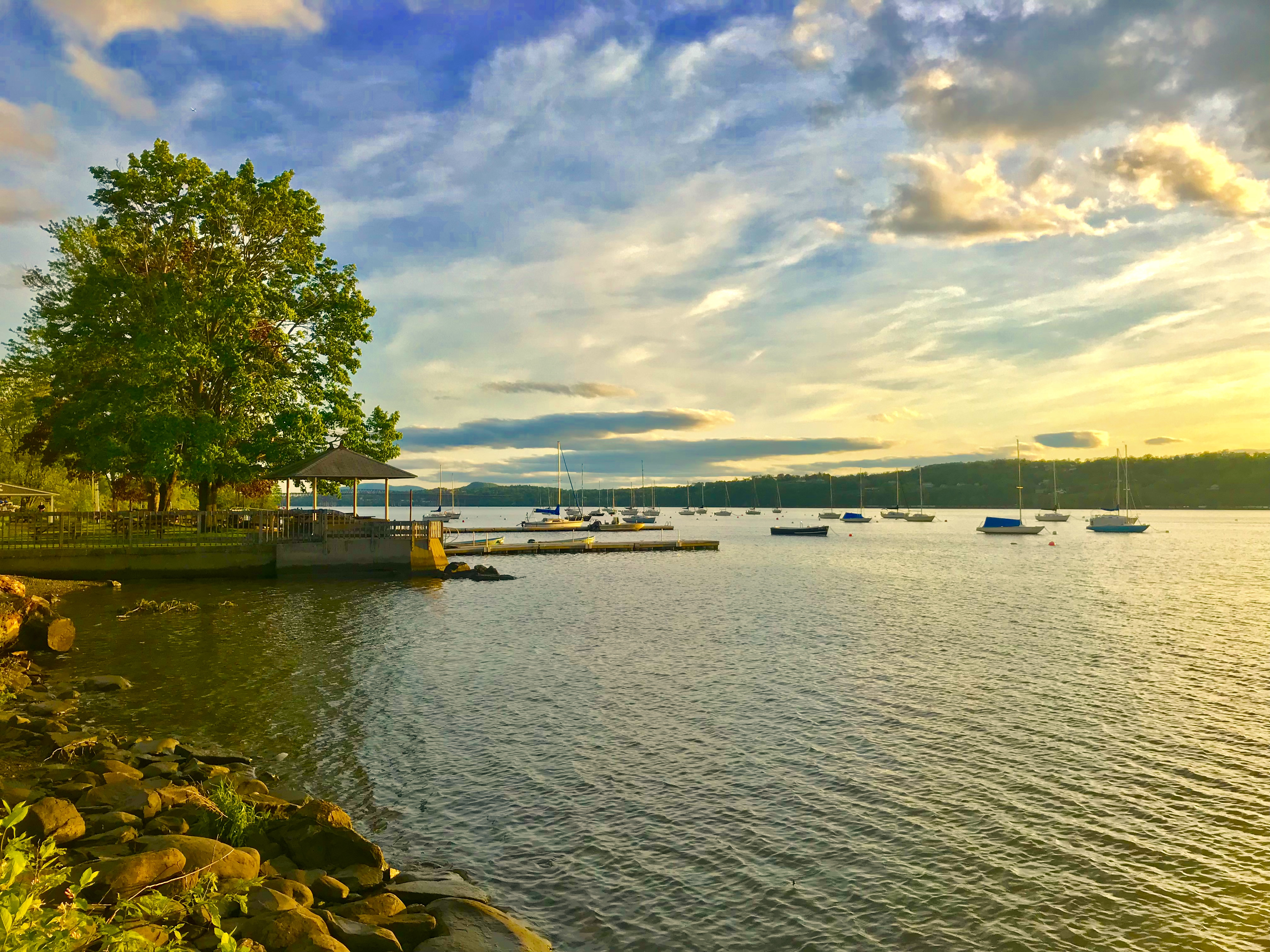
The Hudson River shore of the Rombout Patent in the town of Wappinger, New York

Abraham Isaacsen Verplanck's son Gulian was one of three men granted what is today known as the Rombout Patent. In 1685, King James II of England issued a royal grant for some 85,000 acres (340 km^{2}) of land to Francis Rombouts, Stephanus Van Cortlandt (both former mayors of New York City) and Verplanck purchased from Wappinger Indians on the east bank of the Hudson River in what is today's southern Dutchess County, New York. However, Verplanck died in 1684 and his widow married Jacobus Kip, grandson of Hendrick Hendricksen Kip, and the family's share of the patent passed down through that line.

== See also ==
- Verplanck, with descendants
- Mount Gulian, homestead of son
- Schuyler family, into which his children married
- Jan Everts Bout
- Maryn Adriansen
