= Abraham Pietersen van Deusen =

Dutch emigrant to the United States

Abraham Pietersen van Deursen
- Born: before November 11, 1607; Haarlem
- Died: c. 1670 (age 63)
- Known for: Council of twelve men
- Spouse: Tryntie Melchior Abrahams (1611-1678)
- Parent(s): Pieter van Deursen (c1575-?); Maria or Paulina Vincke (c1575-?)

Abraham Pietersen van Deursen (before November 11, 1607 – c. 1670), aka Abraham Pietersen van Deusen, was an immigrant from Holland who settled in New Amsterdam and become one of the Council of 12 that was the first representative democracy in the Dutch colony. The Van Deursen, Van Deusen, Van Duser, Van Duzer, Van Duzor, Van Duzee, Dearstyne, and Van Dusen families of the United States and Canada are all descended from Abraham Pietersen van Deusen, a miller and a native originating from Haarlem in the Netherlands.

== Birth ==
He was born in 1607 in Haarlem to Pieter van Deursen (c1575-?) and Maria or Paulina Vincke (c1575-?). Pieter and Maria/Paulina were married on January 15, 1591, in Haarlem. Abraham was baptized in Haarlem on Wednesday, November 11, 1607, and the witnesses were Jan Jans and Styntjen Jans.

== Siblings ==
Abraham may have had the following siblings: Handrick Van Dussenberg, who was master of the Masons in 1638, and Adrian Pitersen, of Aitzema, Netherlands, who was a director of the Dutch West India Company.

== Marriage and children ==
Abraham married Tryntie Melchior Abrahams (1611–1678) on December 7, 1629, in Haarlem. Their wedding banns were signed on November 25, 1629, at the Grote Houtstraat in Haarlem. Together they had the following children:

- Teuwis Matheeus Abrahamsen Van Deusen (c.1631-?), who married Helena Robberts
- Marytje Van Deusen (1634-?), who married Thomas Janszen Minsar
- Isaac Van Deusen I (1635-?), who married Jannetie Jans
- Jacob Van Deusen (1638-?), who married Catalynje Van Eslant
- Pieter Van Deusen I (23 March 1642-?), who married Hester Webbers (or Webb)
- Melchior Van Deusen (6 March 1644 – 1742), who married Engeltje Rutgers

== Emigration ==
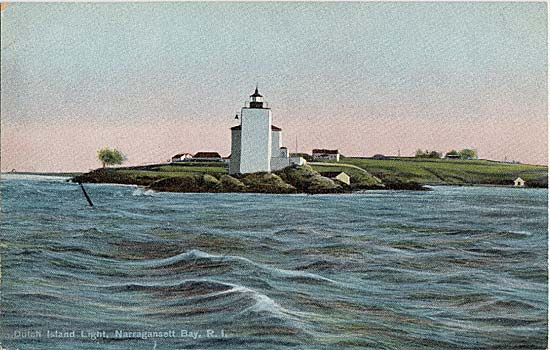
Dutch Island, from an early twentieth century postcard

He emigrated to New Amsterdam before 1636 with his wife, and several of his children. In 1638 he was listed as a miller in New Amsterdam. Cheska Callow Wheatley writes:

New York colonial documents state that Abraham Pietersen, of Haarlem took possession, in 1636, for the Dutch West India Company, of the Island of Quentensis in front of Sloops Bay (now known as Dutch Island). In another place [the island] is described as the Island of Queteurs in front of Sloops Bay and Pequator's River and in 1664 they speak of the special possession of Abraham Pietersen, of Haarlem, still living on the Island of Quetenesse, in the Narricanese Bay near Rhode Island and also of another island near the Pequot River, called by the English: The Dutchmen's Island. In a latter instance he is spoken of, as of Haarlem, owing to his having lived there when he became interested in the first mentioned Island. In 1638, he was spoken of as the first miller in New Amsterdam; an important and lucrative position in those days, and he is sometimes mentioned in the records as Abraham Pietersen, Molenaer, or Miller. In 1641, on August 29 he was one of the "Twelve Men" whom the commonalty chose and empowered to resolve on everything with the Director-General and Council, and on November 3 he was one of the "Eight Men" who sent a memorial to the State General of Holland, setting forth the distressed state on account of the Indian Outbreak, and begging for assistance.

== Council of Twelve Men ==
In 1641, he was appointed to a council of twelve men that were to advise Director-General of New Netherland Willem Kieft on the impending Indian war. This was New Amsterdam's first representative democracy, but it was temporary. The colony attacked the Native American population which led to a retaliatory burning of the colony in Kieft's War. John Franklin Jameson (1859–1937) writes:

Whereupon all the commonalty were called together by the Director to consider this affair, who all appeared and presently twelve men delegated from among them answered the propositions, and resolved at once on war should the murderer be refused; that the attack should be made on [the Indians] in the autumn when they were hunting; meanwhile an effort should be again made by kindness to obtain justice, which was accordingly several times sought for but in vain.

== Council of Eight men ==
In 1643 Abraham was appointed to a new council of eight men. The council petitioned the States-General and blamed governor Kieft for the declining economic condition of the nascent colony. They requested that a new Director-General of New Netherland be appointed and that the people themselves be given more influence in the new government. Director General Kieft was dismissed, and Peter Stuyvesant took his place, remaining in power until the colony was turned over to the British in 1664. Kieft returned to Holland, but the vessel was lost at sea and his body was never recovered. John Franklin Jameson (1859–1937) writes:

The commonalty were called together; they were sore distressed. They chose eight, in the stead of the previous twelve, persons to aid in consulting for the best; but the occupation every one had to take care of his own, prevented anything beneficial being adopted at that time. nevertheless it was resolved that as many Englishmen as were to be got in the country should be enlisted, who were indeed now proposing to depart; the third part of these were to be paid by the commonalty; this promise was made by the commonalty but was not followed by the pay.

== Burgher ==
In 1657 Abraham became a burgher, and there is no more mention of him in the extant records.

== Death and burial ==
He died sometime before July 28, 1672. That is the date his wife died, and she was listed as a widow. It is not known where he was buried.

== Legacy ==
Abraham Pietersen Van Deursen (1607-c1670) was the third great-grandfather of Martin Van Buren (1782–1862), the 8th President of the United States, and ancestor of Franklin D. Roosevelt (1882–1945) the 32nd President of the United States.

== Timeline ==
- 1607 Baptism in Haarlem, Netherlands on November 11
- 1624 New Amsterdam established
- 1627 Marriage to Tryntie Melchiors (1611–1678) in Haarlem on December 7
- 1636 Emigration from Netherlands
- 1636 Living on Island of Quentensis in front of Sloops Bay
- 1638 Working as miller in New Amsterdam
- 1638 Willem Kieft appointed Director General
- 1640 The Pig War
- 1641 Council of 12 chosen on August 29
- 1642 Council of 12 convened to discuss Indian War on February 18
- 1642 Colony attacks Native-Americans
- 1643 Council of 8 convened on September 13
- 1644 Council of 8 seeks an expanded role in the government on June 18
- 1644 Council of 8 petitions Amsterdam for relief from Kieft in October
- 1647 Willem Kieft departs
- 1647 Peter Stuyvesant appointed
- 1657 Appointed burgher on April 14
- 1657 Lance Corporal of Company Second of the Burghers Corps
- 1664 New Amsterdam under Peter Stuyvesant captured by the British and renamed New York
- 1664 Abraham and son, Isaac swear allegiance to the King of England in October
- 1670 (c.) Death of Abraham
- 1672 Death of his wife on July 28

== See also ==
- Eight Men
- Twelve Men
