= Massacre at Corlears Hook =

Colonial massacre of Wecquaesgeek in Manhattan, New Netherland

Coordinates: 40.711°N 73.982°W

The Massacre at Corlears Hook of February 25, 1643, was a colonial massacre of forty Wecquaesgeek of all ages and genders on the Lower East Side of Manhattan, perpetrated by a force led by Maryn Adriansen, acting under Willem Kieft, the Director of New Netherland.

Kieft sought to take advantage of Wappinger who had been driven south by the Mohawks and Mahicans and taken refuge at their old settlement of Rechtauck on Corlears Hook, fleeing to lands controlled by their erstwhile Dutch allies. Launched on the same night as the larger Pavonia Massacre in modern Jersey City, the pair of unprovoked attacks instigated the two years' Kieft's War.

An account comes from David Pietersz. de Vries, the chairman of Kieft's council on Native relations, which had been created amid conflict 1½ years earlier. Kieft had dissolved the Twelve Men just two weeks before the attacks, due to opposition to his war policy by De Vries and others. He described the events as follows:

At another place on the same night at Corler's Hook, on Corler's plantation, forty Indians were in the same manner attacked in their sleep, and massacred there in the same manner as the Duke of Alva did in the Netherlands, but more cruelly...
