= Jan Everts Bout =

Jan Evertsz Bout (March 1601 or 1602, Barneveld, Gelderland – 1671 Gowanus), was an early and prominent Dutch settler in the 17th century colonial province of New Netherland.

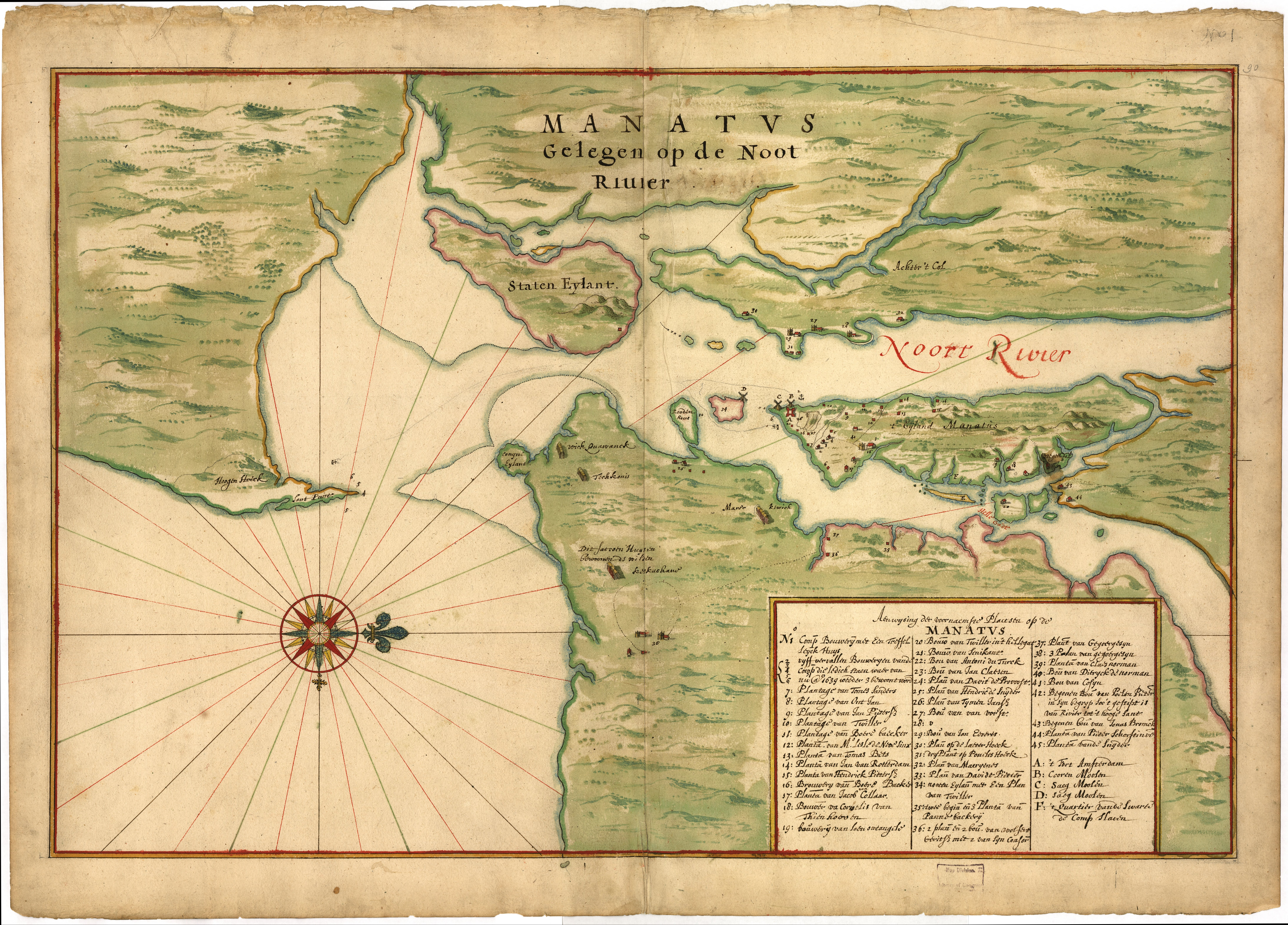
Map (c. 1639) Manhattan situated on the North River Numbers 29 and 30 represent the holdings of Bout at Communipaw

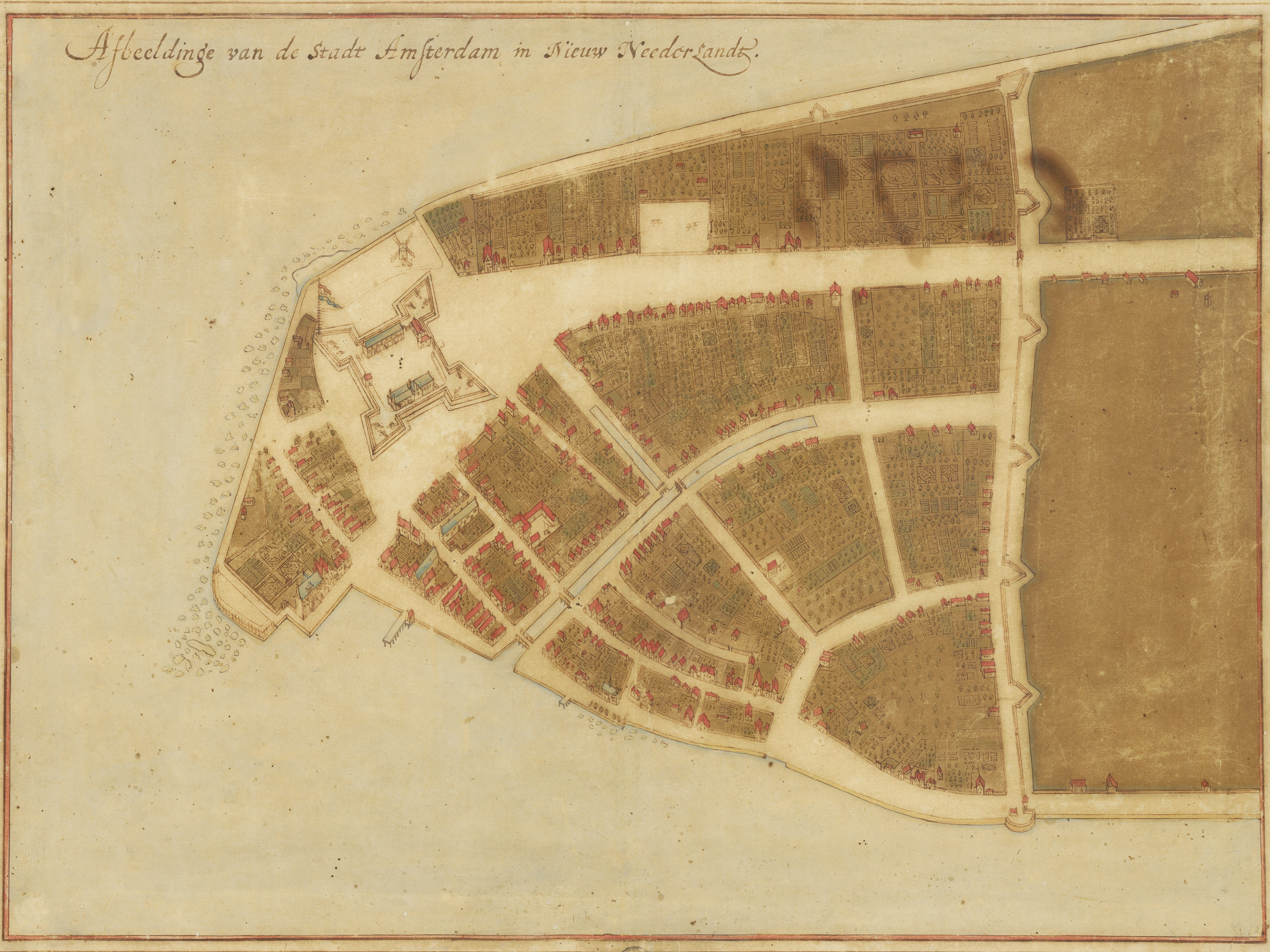
The Castello Plan

In 1634 one of the first "bouweries", or homesteads, in the colony of New Netherland was built at Communipaw on the west bank of the North River as part of Pavonia, a patroonship of Amsterdam businessman Michiel Reyniersz Pauw. Bout was the second of three superintendents for the patroonship. The spit of land on which the house was built (near contemporary Liberty State Park in Jersey City) was called Jan de Lacher's Hoeck. or Jan the Laugher's Point, apparently in reference to his boisterous character. It was at Bout's homestead that the Tappan and Wecquaesgeek had taken refuge, and was where they were attacked in 1643, in the incident known as the Pavonia Massacre which led to Kieft's War.

Bout was member of the Council of Eight Men, a citizens advisory board for the Commonality of New Amsterdam that was instrumental in the removal of William Kieft as the Director of New Netherland, the Twelve Men and the Nine Men. He accompanied Adriaen van der Donck to the Netherlands to present grievances to the States-General of the Netherlands about mismanagement by the Dutch West India Company. This led to the granting of a municipal charter for New Amsterdam.

When given its municipal charter in 1653, the Commonality of New Amsterdam included the isle of Manhattan, Staaten Eylandt, Pavonia, and the Lange Eylandt towns. Bout was later a signatory for the 1658 treaty-deed purchasing the lands of lower Bergen Hill that would become Hudson County.

Bout later moved to Brooklyn, where he had acquired land patents including the area around the Gowanus Canal As noted in The Iconography of Manhattan Island's Key to the Castello Plan, Bout owned property on Manhattan Island, specifically Block H, No. 1 and Block D, No. 21.

== See also ==
- Bergen
- Harsimus
- Paulus Hook
- Pavonia
- Council of Eight Men
- Kieft's War
- Maryn Adriansen
