= Cornelis Melyn =

Dutch landowner (1600–c. 1662)

Cornelis Melyn (1600 – c. 1662) was an early Dutch settler in New Netherland and Patroon of Staten Island. He was the chairman of the council of eight men, which was a part of early steps toward representative democracy in the Dutch colony.

== Early life ==
Cornelis Melyn was born in Antwerp, then a part of the Spanish Netherlands, where he was baptised at St. Walburga Church September 17, 1600, the son of Andries and Maria (Gheudinx-Botens) Melyn, and grandson of Lambrecht Melyn, of the same place. Both of Cornelis' parents died in 1606. Two guardians, Jacques Melyn and Hans Salomons, were appointed for him and he was taken into the family of his half-brother Abraham Melyn to be raised. When he was about twelve years of age, Cornelis was apprenticed as a tailor.

When Melyn was about 18 years old, the priest of St. Walburga Church issued him a baptismal certificate and a certificate of good conduct. It is possible he left Antwerp at this time for Amsterdam, where he married Janneken Adriaens in 1627. Their marriage certificate lists them both as residing in Amsterdam. By this time, Melyn had changed his occupation, being listed in this certificate as a seemtouwer, a "dresser of the finer and softer leathers".

== Migration to New Amsterdam ==
Cornelis Melyn made at least one voyage to the New World before deciding to settle there, as supercargo aboard the Dutch West India Company's ship Het Wapen van Noorwegen (The Arms of Norway) in 1638. After returning to the Netherlands, he applied for the Patroonship of Staten Island, which he was granted July 3, 1640. Soon afterwards, he sailed, possibly in the Engel Gabriel (Angel Gabriel), for New Netherland. But the vessel was captured by a Dunkirk raider August 13, 1640, and Melyn was forced to return to the Netherlands.

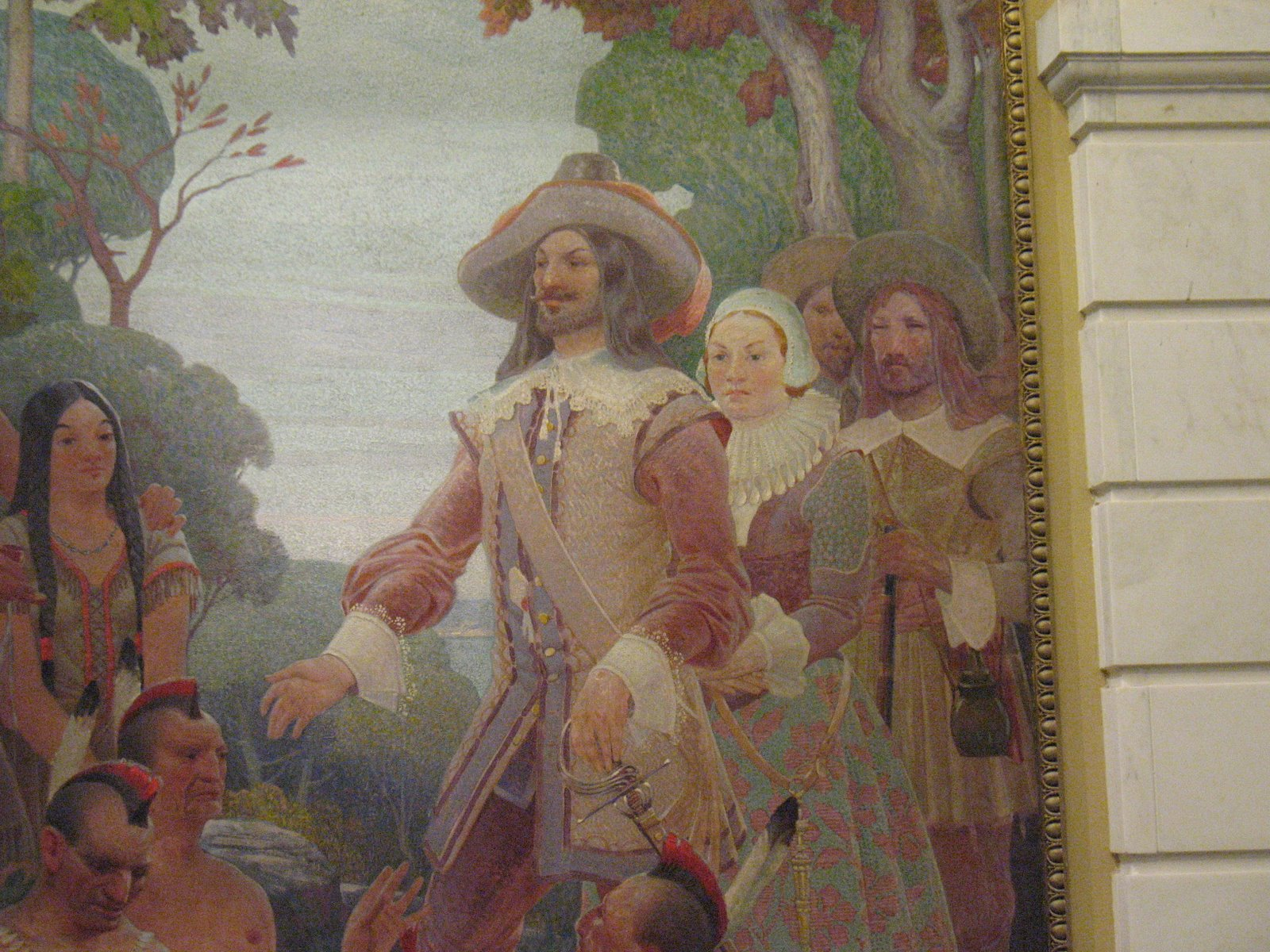
"Cornelis Melyn Trades with the Indians," part of the series of WPA murals painted by Frederick Charles Stahr in the Staten Island Borough Hall.

Melyn sailed once again to New Amsterdam May 17, 1641, aboard the vessel Den Eyckenboom (The Oak Tree) with a new party of colonists, including his wife and children. Also on board was Adriaen van der Donck who would one day be a political ally of Melyn and a fellow victim of Director-General Peter Stuyvesant's persecution. Soon after arrival of Den Eyckenboom in New Amsterdam, Cornelis Melyn and his party of 41 persons were at work establishing a new colony on Staten Island. June 19, 1642, Melyn received from Director-General Willem Kieft his patent to all of Staten Island except for a farm which had already been allocated to David Pietersen de Vries.

== Leadership ==
In November 1643, during the bloody conflict with the neighboring Lenape tribes which became known as Kieft's War, Melyn and his colonists were forced to abandon Staten Island. According to his own statement, "I was obliged to flee for the sake of saving my life, and to sojourn with wife and children at the Menatans till the year 1647."

In 1644, his plantation having been destroyed, Cornelis Melyn purchased three adjacent lots near the Dutch fort on lower Manhattan, along the East River near the intersection of the present Broad and Pearl Streets. He settled there with his family for the next three years. As the Dutch colony drifted into chaos and some colonists expressed outrage at what they considered Kieft's ineptitude, the Director-General sought to placate his critics by appointing a council of eight men, with Cornelis Melyn as chairman, to assist him in governing the colony. This body, which was supposed to represent the people of New Amsterdam, was one of the earliest steps toward representative democracy in that colony. The colonists' opposition to Kieft continued, however, and the council demanded his removal in a letter transmitted to the States-General of the Netherlands in October 1644.

Melyn is attributed with having written the Breeden Raedt, considered one of the earliest descriptions of life in the colony and condemnation of Dutch West Indies Company policies.

== Conflict With Stuyvesant ==
In 1647, when Peter Stuyvesant arrived in New Amsterdam to replace Kieft as Director-General, Melyn and Jochem Pietersen Kuyter, acting in name of the citizens of New Amsterdam, brought charges against the outgoing governor, demanding an investigation of his conduct while in office. Recognizing the danger of such actions to his own administration, Stuyvesant refused to consider Melyn and Kuyter's demands and caused them to be tried for lèse-majesté. The case was quickly decided against the defendants, who were sentenced to banishment from the colony.

August 16, 1647, Kuyter and Melyn sailed aboard the Princess Amelia to appeal their convictions to the States-General. Their vessel ran aground off the coast of Wales, but both survived and were able to present their cases in early 1648. The States-General acted favorably upon their appeal and issued a writ of mandamus dated May 6 ordering Director-General Stuyvesant to appear in person, or through his representative, to sustain his judgment against them.

Cornelis Melyn returned once again to New Amsterdam and caused the writ to be presented to Stuyvesant March 8, 1649, at a dramatic meeting in the New Amsterdam church. As Burton describes the confrontation:

Melyn appeared at this meeting and demanded that Their High Mightinesses' Letter and the mandamus be read and explained to the people. In the midst of considerable excitement, Melyn handed the mandamus to Arnoldus van Hardenbergh to be read aloud. Stuyvesant in a rage snatched the mandamus from van Hardenbergh's hands, and in the confusion the seal was torn off. Melyn then offered Stuyvesant a copy of the mandamus, whereupon the latter was induced by some of the bystanders to return the original, which was read, including of course the summons commanding Stuyvesant to enter appearance without delay at the Hague to defend the judgment. Stuyvesant replied: "I honor the States General, and their commission and will obey their commands, and will send an agent to maintain the judgment as it was well and legally pronounced." Melyn demanded a written reply, but this neither Stuyvesant nor his Secretary would give.

Melyn returned to the Netherlands in August 1649. Stuyvesant's representative, Cornelis van Tienhoven, the Secretary of the Colony, also proceeded aboard a different vessel. The case was apparently never brought to a hearing.

Melyn returned in 1650 aboard the Nieuw Nederlandsche Fortuyn (New Netherland's Fortune) to resume his attempt to colonize Staten Island, along with a group of about 70 persons. His feud continued with Director-General Stuyvesant, who had him arrested and imprisoned without trial or hearing in 1655. During Melyn's imprisonment, there was another Indigenous uprising known as the Peach War which destroyed the Staten Island colony. It was soon after this disaster that Cornelis Melyn and family left for the English New Haven Colony, where he took an oath of allegiance to the English crown April 7, 1657. In 1659, he agreed with the West India Company to relinquish his right of Patroonship of Staten Island.

== Death ==
There is no record of Cornelis Melyn's death, but his name ceases to appear in the records of the New Haven colony after 1663 and is not mentioned in the records of the marriages of his two daughters in New Haven August 25, 1664. Melyn's role in history is recognized in a mural in the Staten Island Borough Hall by Frederick Charles Stahr entitled Cornelius Melyn Trades With the Indians.
