= Jacob Walingen van Winkel =

American colonial

Jacob Wallingen Van Winkle (aka Jacob Walingen and Jacob Wallich van Winkle, sometimes spelled Waligh, (b. 1599 d. 8/17/1657), from Winkel, North Holland, Netherlands was an early settler to New Netherland. the 17th century Dutch colony in North America. He was later joined brother Symon (b. unknown d. 3//1649).

It is possible he first visited the nascent colony as a deckhead in 1618. Jacob was a tenant farmer on Manhattan Island for the Dutch West India Company (DWIC) from about 1624 to 1636. In 1633, Jacob and Symon travelled to Holland aboard the Souterbergh to purchase additional cattle for the DWIC, returning in June 1635 aboard the King David.

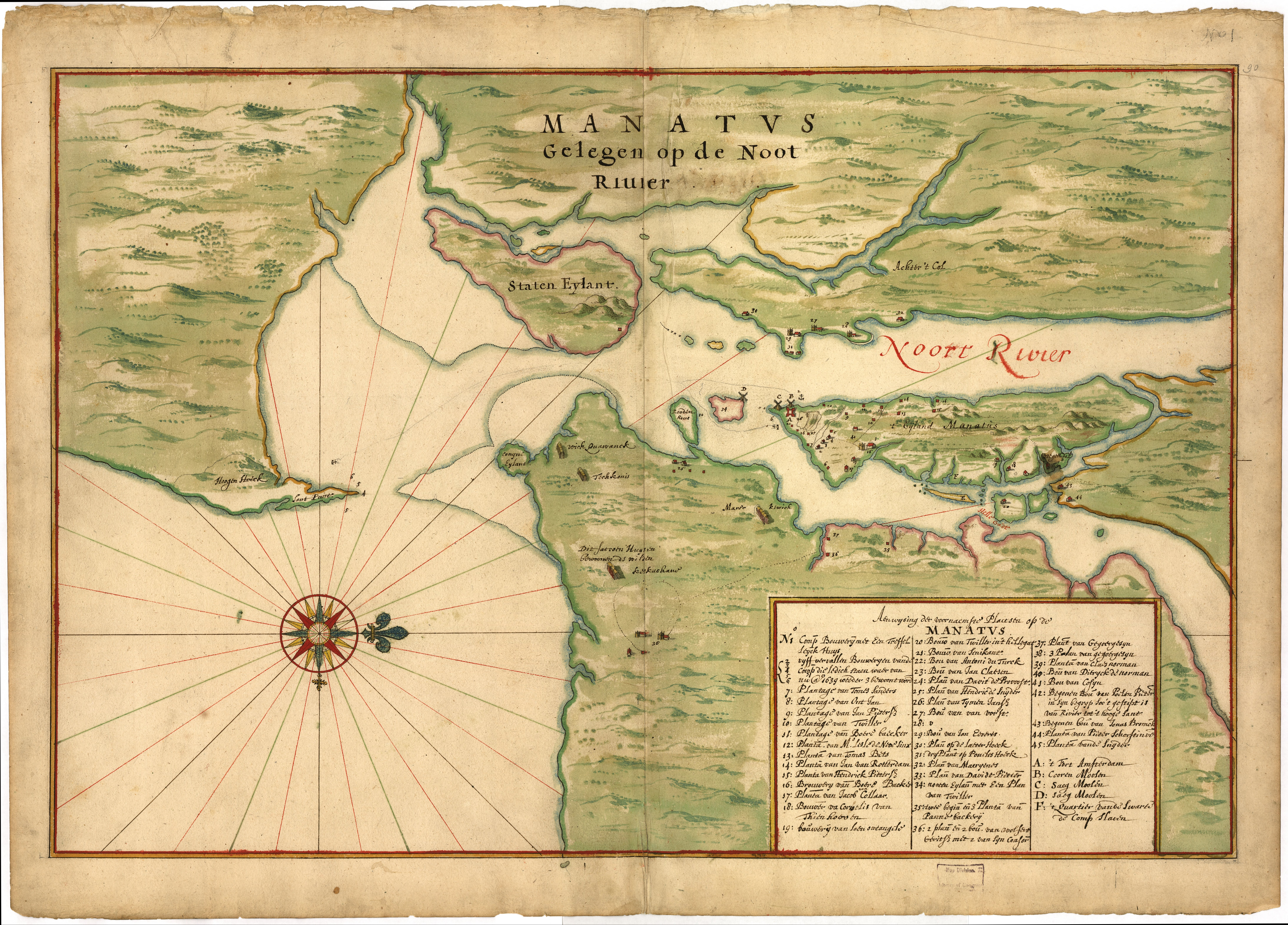
Harrisse/LOC copy of the Manatus Map of 1639. From about 1624 to 1636 van Winkel leased farm #5 on Manhattan Island.

After the lease ended, Jacob signed a contract to farm parcels of land at the patroonship of Rensselaerswyck including those on Papscanee Island, which Kiliaen van Rensselaer had purchased in 1637 (at what became Greenbush and later Rensselaer).

Van Winkel was asked to give advice to the Twelve Men, an official citizens' body considered an early form of representative government in the American colonies.

Symon purchased a plantation at Manhattan Island but was killed shortly after by Native Americans in the massacre at Pavonia (located on the west bank of the North River in present day Jersey City, New Jersey).

After this event Jacob spent many years traveling between the Netherlands and the Dutch colony of New Netherland negotiating for land purchases within certain parts of the colony. He unsuccessfully petitioned to start a community along the Connecticut River.

In 1654 he received a patent of 25 morgens of land at Pavonia "between Communipaw and the Kill van Kull" on Bergen Neck. An out break of hostilities between the natives and the colonists in September 1655 known as the Peach War forced settlers, including Jacob, to flee to Fort Amsterdam in New Amsterdam. Van Winkle was admitted as a lesser burgher of New Amsterdam on 17 April 1657. After peace was restored he returned to Pavonia and rebuilt his farm, but died shortly after.

== Family ==
Van Winkel married Tryntje Jacobsen on December 28, 1642, in Hoorn (North Holland, Netherlands). When he died in 1657, he left his wife and seven children. She married three times more. Following Dutch custom in the 17th century children would take the father's first name as part of their surname (Jocobse=son of Jacob).

- Marritje Jacobse Van Wickle (b. ca. 1643)
- Grietje Jacobse Van Winkle (b. ca. 1645)
- Waling Jacobsz Van Winkle b. (ca. 1647), namesake for the borough of Wallington, New Jersey, where he had built a home.
- Jacob Jacobsz Van Winkle b. (16 Oct 1650)
- Simon Jacobsz Van Winkle b. (24 Aug 1653)
- Annetje Jacobse Van Winkle b. (2 Jan 1656)

== Legacy ==
Van Winkle Avenue, in the Marion Section of Jersey City was part of the family's holdings in Bergen near Bergen Square. Daniel Van Winkel documented his family history and wrote about the early history of Hudson and Bergen counties. and wrote for the New York Times several articles documenting the history. Wallington, New Jersey, is named for the family.
