= Eight Men =

Early representational democracy in New Netherland

The Eight Men was a group of eight residents chosen by the people of New Netherland in 1643 to advise Director Willem Kieft on his governance of the colony. An early form of representational democracy in colonial North America, it replaced the similarly selected Twelve Men and was followed by the Nine Men.

== Council ==
In 1643 Abraham Pietersen Van Deusen, who had served on the council of the Twelve Men, was appointed to a new body of eight men. The group contacted the Estates-General of the Netherlands and blamed governor Willem Kieft for the declining economic condition of the nascent colony, and Kieft's War with the Native Americans. They requested that a new director-general of New Netherland be appointed, and that the people be given more influence in the new government. Director-General Kieft was dismissed and replaced by Peter Stuyvesant. Kieft left for Holland in September 1647 to defend himself to the Estates-General, but the Princess Amelia was lost at sea and his body was never recovered. Stuyvesant remained in power until the colony was turned over to the British in 1664.

== Council Members ==
The council members were:

- Isaac Allerton
- Jan Jansen Dam, who was replaced by Jan Everts Bout
- Barent Dircksen
- Oloff Stevense Van Cortlandt
- Thomas Hal, sometimes spelled as Thomas Hall
- Jochem Pietersen Kuyter
- Cornelis Melyn, was chairman
- Abraham Pietersen Van Deursen
- Wolphert Gerretse Van Kouwenhoven
- Captain John Underhill, appointed in 1645

== See also ==
- Adriaen van der Donck
- Schepen
- Schout
- Burgomaster
- Voorleser
