= Van Deusen =

Van Deusen is a surname of Dutch origin, sometimes spelled VanDeusen or Van Dursen. Notable people with the surname include:

- Abraham Pietersen Van Deusen (before 1607–c. 1670), Dutch colonist in New Amsterdam
- Carol Van Deusen, a partner of balloonist Larry Walters
- Charles Van Deusen, a detective who was involved in the Omaha Race Riot of 1919
- Katherine S. Van Deusen, wife of U.S. General William Westmoreland
- Mary Westbrook Van Deusen (1829–1908), American author
- J.B & J.D. Van Deusen Shipbuilding firm started by Joseph B. Van Deusen and James D. Van Deusen in 1865
- TJ Van Deusen, banker
- Edward Van Deusen, carpenter
- Katheryn Van Deusen, artist

== See also ==
- Van Deusen's rat (Rattus vandeuseni)
