= Voorleser =

Former position in Dutch colonies

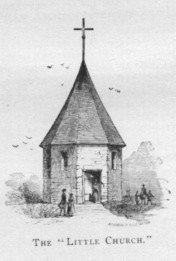
Dutch church in Old Bergen Township, 1680.

Voorleser was the title given to a responsible citizen in New Netherland and later Dutch colonies who had semi-official duties in local law, education and religion.

== Etymology ==
The word voorleser as used in English texts is a variant of the Dutch word voorlezer, which means "one who reads (to others)". However, both spellings are used interchangeably when referring to the title used by colonial Dutch Americans. It has several different translations or interpretations, such as "lay reader", "public reader", "fore-reader", and "church reader".

== History ==
The title was commonly used from the mid-17th century to the late 18th century. In the villages of the era, one person could accomplish many tasks. After the English took over the Dutch settlements of New Netherland, Dutch settlers continued relying on the voorleser for maintaining village records and documentation. The last person given the title resigned in 1789; his successor was given the title of "clerk". However, documents were maintained in Dutch until 1809. The population grew beyond the ability of one person to maintain, and the majority of settlers began speaking and keeping records in English. Thus, the role of the voorleser disappeared, and the voorleser's tasks were redistributed.

== Duties ==
The voorleser had numerous local duties and was considered an important member of the community by the early settlers. Each voorleser had jurisdiction over virtually all legal and religious actions and ceremonies in their community. Voorlesers required scholarly qualities, as they acted as the village clerk and schoolmaster, typically educating the youth in the same building where religious services were held.

As a de facto minister, occasionally reading the scriptures, the voorleser was responsible for baptisms, communicants and marriages. When a death occurred, voorleser were given full charge of funerary tasks, serving as an undertaker, grave-digger, or sexton, and attending the burial. The voorleser led the congregation in singing during church services, and in the absence of a proper pastor, performed the ceremonies on Sabbath, which consisted of prayers and typically, a prepared sermon by a theologian from the Netherlands. They also read the law and creed, as well as portions of the Psalms.

== Notable voorlesers ==
- Stuynhuysen, Engelbert – Old Bergen's first voorleser, gaining the title in 1662.
- Bertholf, Guiliam – began working in Harlem, New York City on April 24, 1690.
- Sickels, Abraham – Old Bergen's last voorleser, retired in 1789.

== Advisory boards ==
Other prominent members in the community of New Amsterdam (which included all the settlements around the Upper New York Bay) were part of councils that advised the Director of New Netherland. Called upon at various times during the colony's existence, they were known as the Twelve Men, the Eight Men and the Nine Men.

== See also ==
- Voorlezer's House
