= Nine Men =

Council of citizens in New Netherland

The Nine Men was a council of citizens elected by the residents of New Netherland to advise its Director General Peter Stuyvesant on the governance of the colony. It replaced the previous body, the Eight Men, which itself had superseded the Twelve Men. Members of this early form of representational democracy in North America were elected in 1647, 1649, 1650 and 1652.

On July 26, 1649, eleven current and former members of the board signed the Petition of the Commonality of New Netherland, which requested that the Estates-General take action to encourage economic freedom and force local government like that in the Netherlands, removing the colony from the control of the Dutch West India Company. It became the basis for the municipal government when the city of New Amsterdam received its charter in 1653.

== Members ==
Members and the year of election:

- Key

= Member of the council
= Chairman

Name	1647	1649	1650	1652
Allard Anthony (Antonides)				
Willem Beekman				
Jan Evertsen Bout				
Peter Cornelissen				
Jan Jansen Damen				
Isaac de Forrest				
Thomas Hall				
Augustine Herman				
Hendrick Hendricksen Kip				
Jochem Pietersen Kuyter				
Govert Loockermans				
David Provoost				
Jacob Wolfertse van Couwenhoven				
Jacobus van Curler				
Paulus Leendertz Vandergrift				
Arnoldus van Hardenbergh				
Arent van Hattem				
Elber Elbertsen van Stoothoff				
Oloff Stevense Van Cortlandt				
Adriaen van der Donck				
Michiel Jansen Vreelandt				

== See also ==
- Burgomaster
- Voorleser
- Schepen
- Schout
- Maryn Adriansen
- Abraham Isaacsen Verplanck
