= Twelve Men =

Council of citizens in New Netherland

The Twelve Men was a council of citizens chosen by the residents of New Netherland to advise Director Willem Kieft on relations with the Native Americans in the wake of the murder of Claes Swits. Elected on 29 August 1641, the temporary council was the first representational form of democracy in the Dutch colony. The next two such bodies were known as the Eight Men and the Nine Men.

== Background ==
The Dutch West India Company had incurred significant expenses building and manning fortifications. Kieft sought to offset some of the cost by demanding contribution from the Indians, whom he saw as deriving protection from rival tribes. They declined, pointing out that the Dutch had not been invited in the first place, and with the Indian settlements so scattered, by the time word reached the fort any help dispatched would be too late.

In the spring of 1640, some Raritan Indians attacked a Company trading boat near Staten Island and stole a canoe. They were subsequently mistakenly blamed for the theft of some pigs from the farm of David Pietersz de Vries. Kieft sent Cornelis van Tienhoven with a force of seventy soldiers and sailors to demand payment. The Raritan declined to pay for pigs that they had not taken. As the meeting broke up, the Dutch suddenly attacked, killing a few Raritan, capturing several, and routing the rest. Within six weeks, the Raritan responded by burning De Vries' house and tobacco sheds. Four colonists died. Kieft spread word to several other tribes that he would pay a bounty in wampum for every head of a Raritan brought to him. A peace was reached by the end of the year.

In August 1641, a Weckquaesgeek Indian killed Claes Swits, an elderly Dutch immigrant who ran a public house frequented by settlers and Indians alike at Turtle Bay, Manhattan. As a child, the young Indian had witnessed the murder of his uncle, and upon coming of age took revenge. The Weckquaesgeek refused to hand the killer over to the Dutch.

Another incident occurred at Achter Kol along the banks of the Hackensack River. Settlers and some Hackensacks had been drinking alcohol at a trading post when a conflict arose over a missing coat which ended in the death of the post's foreman.

== Council of Twelve ==
Kieft was determined to conduct punitive measures against the Indians, but reluctant to assume sole responsibility for the decision. In August 1641, he summoned twelve prominent settlers to New Amsterdam to advise him on relations with the Indians. He posed three questions:

1. Whether it is not just to punish the barbarous murder of Claes Swits committed by an Indian and, in case the Indians refuse to surrender the murderer at our request, whether it is not justifiable to ruin the entire village to which he belongs?
2. In what manner the same ought be put into effect and at what time?
3. By whom it may be undertaken?

The twelve council members were:

- David Pietersen de Vries (chairman)
- Maryn Adriansen
- Jacques Benteyn, (schout)
- Jan Jansen Damen
- Gerrit Dircksen
- Hendrik Jansen
- Jochem Pietersen Kuyter
- Frederick Lubbertsen
- Abram Molenaar, also known as Abraham Pietersen van Deusen
- Joris Jansen Rapelje
- Jacob Stoffelsen
- Abraham Isaacsen Verplanck

They did not counsel war, as desired by Willem Kieft, but recommended patience and negotiations to resolve differences with the tribes. They then requested that four of their number be elected to the Director-General's Council. Kieft was not pleased with the advice received. After months of haggling, in January 1642, Kieft told them that he would accept their request if they, in turn, would support his proposed war. The Council reluctantly agreed.

Krieft dissolved the Council of Twelve in February 1643 and forbade them to meet without his permission. His duplicity did nothing to reduce opposition to the war. Not all of the Twelve opposed Kieft's plan.

A group of Tappan had moved to Pavonia, while a second group from east of the Hudson were at Corlears Hook. Both were seeking refuge from attacks of the Mohawk to the north. On February 24, 1643, Maryn Adriansen, Jan Jansen Damen, and Damen's step-sons-in-law Abraham Isaacsen Verplanck and Cornelis Van Tienhoven, petitioned the Director to order an immediate attack upon the two groups of refugees. Kieft readily endorsed their request. He ordered Van Tienhoven to lead the soldiers stationed at Fort Amsterdam on a raid on those sheltering at Pavonia. It took place the following night and eighty Tappan were killed. Kieft ordered Maryn Adriaensen and a band of volunteers to go to Corlear's Hook to attack the refugees there. Forty Indian men, women and children were killed there. This served to unite the various tribes against the Dutch and war broke out.

The majority of the Twelve Men, most of whom who had not known of the petition, objected strongly to Kieft's actions. Kieft blamed Maryn Adriaensen, who then armed himself, went to Fort Amsterdam and attacked Kieft. Kieft was unharmed, and Adriaensen arrested. His friends managed to have him sent to Amsterdam for trial, where he was acquitted.

== See also ==
- Schepen
- Burgomaster
- Voorleser
