= Pavonia, New Netherland =

European settlement on the Hudson River

Coordinates: 40.7237°N 74.0424°W

Pavonia was the first European settlement on the west bank of the North River (Hudson River) that was part of the seventeenth-century province of New Netherland in what would become the present Hudson County, New Jersey.

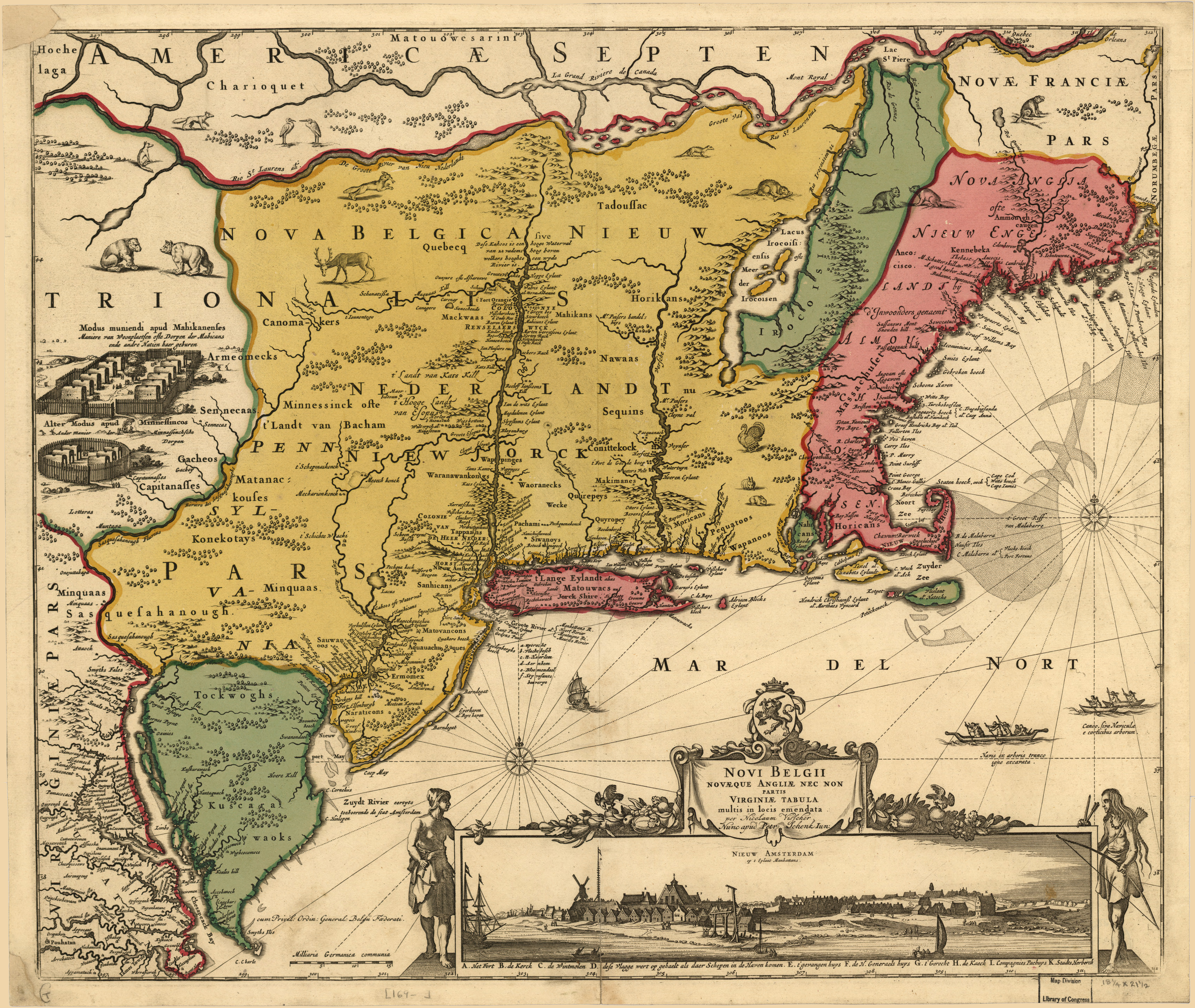
Reprint of 1650 map of New Netherland

== Hudson and the Hackensack ==
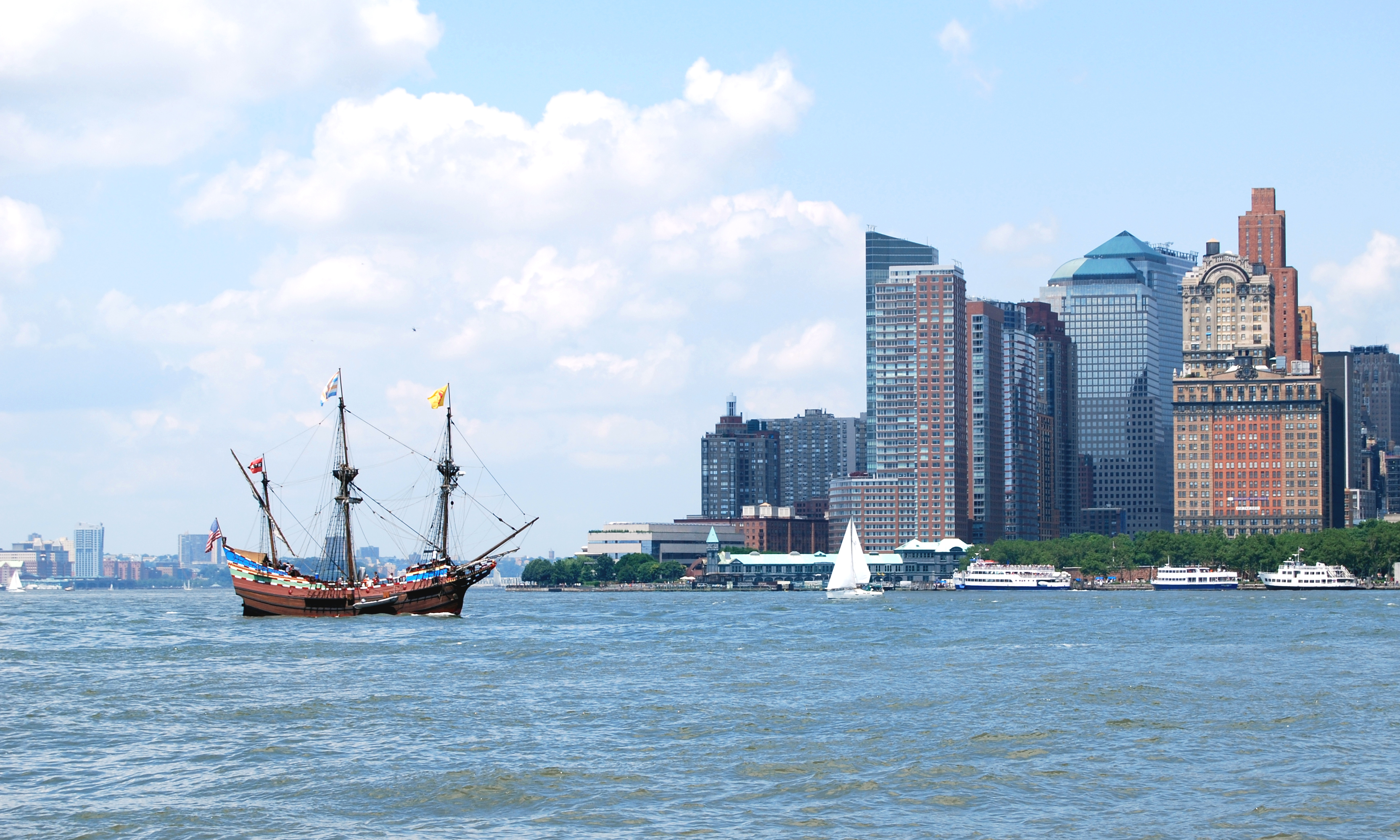
The replica Half Moon at mouth of the Hudson River approaching Lower Manhattan, site of New Amsterdam, with Hoboken, part of Pavonia, in background at left

The first European to record exploration of the area was Robert Juet, first mate of Henry Hudson, an English sea captain commissioned by the Dutch East India Company. Their ship, the Halve Maen (Half Moon), ventured in the Kill van Kull and Newark Bay and anchored at Weehawken Cove during 1609, while exploring the Upper New York Bay and the Hudson Valley. By 1617 a factorij, or trading post, was established at Communipaw.

Initially, these posts were set up for fur trade with the indigenous population. At that time the area was inhabited by bands of Algonquian language speaking peoples, known collectively as Lenni Lenape and later called the Delawares. Early maps show it to be the territory of the Sangicans. Later, the group of seasonally migrational people who circulated in the region were to become known by the exonym, Hackensack. They, along with the Tappan, the Wappinger, the Raritan, the Canarsee, and other groups would be known to future settlers as "the River Indians".

== Patroonship ==
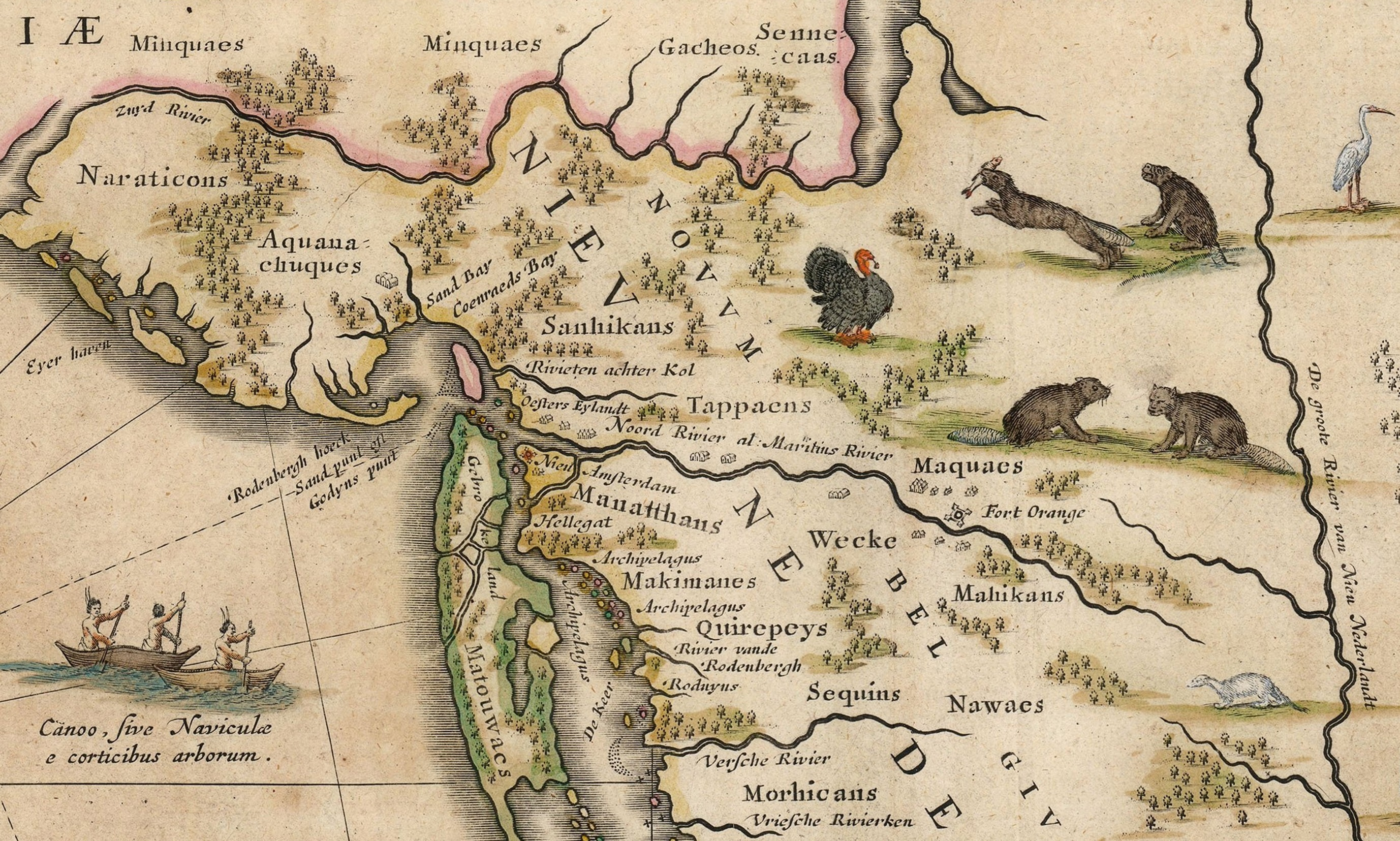
Map (c1634) Pavonia located at what originally was called Oesters Eylandt, or Oyster Island, and Achter Kol, meaning Behind the Ridge and refers to Bergen Hill

Further explorations and settlement led to the establishment of Fort Amsterdam at the southern tip of the island of Manhattan in 1625. In 1629, with the Charter of Freedoms and Exemptions, the Dutch West India Company started to grant the title of patroon and land patents to some of its invested members. The deeded tracts spanned 16 miles (26 km) in length on one side of a major river, or 8 miles (13 km) if spanning both sides. The title came with powerful rights and privileges, including creating civil and criminal courts, appointing local officials, and holding land in perpetuity. In return, a patroon was expected to establish a settlement of at least fifty families within four years of the original grant. These first settlers were relieved of the duty of public taxes for ten years, but were required to pay the patroon in money, goods, or services in kind.

A patent for the west bank of the North River was given to Michael Pauw, a burgermeester of Amsterdam and a director of the Dutch West India Company. Pavonia is the Latinized form of Pauw's surname, which means "peacock". As was required, Pauw purchased the land from the indigenous population, although the concept of ownership differed significantly for the parties involved. Three Lenape "sold" the land for 80 fathoms (150 m) of wampum (shell beads strung together), 20 fathoms (37 m) of cloth, 12 kettles, six guns, two blankets, one double kettle, and half a barrel of beer. These transactions, dated July 12, 1630, and November 22, 1630, represent the earliest known conveyance for the area. It is said that the three were part of the same band who had sold Manhattan Island to Peter Minuit then "sold" this land, to which they had retired after that sale in 1626. On August 10, 1630, Pauw obtained a deed for Staten Island, leading some historians to consider Staten Island to be part of Pavonia.

Michael Pauw directed the West India Company to source 50 enslaved Africans from Pernambuco (a major slave port in Brazil, freshly taken over by the Dutch just months prior) to Pavonia. Patroons were then promised a supply of Africans from the WIC for lease or for permanent assignment to their land.

== Paulus Hook, Harsimus, and Communipaw ==
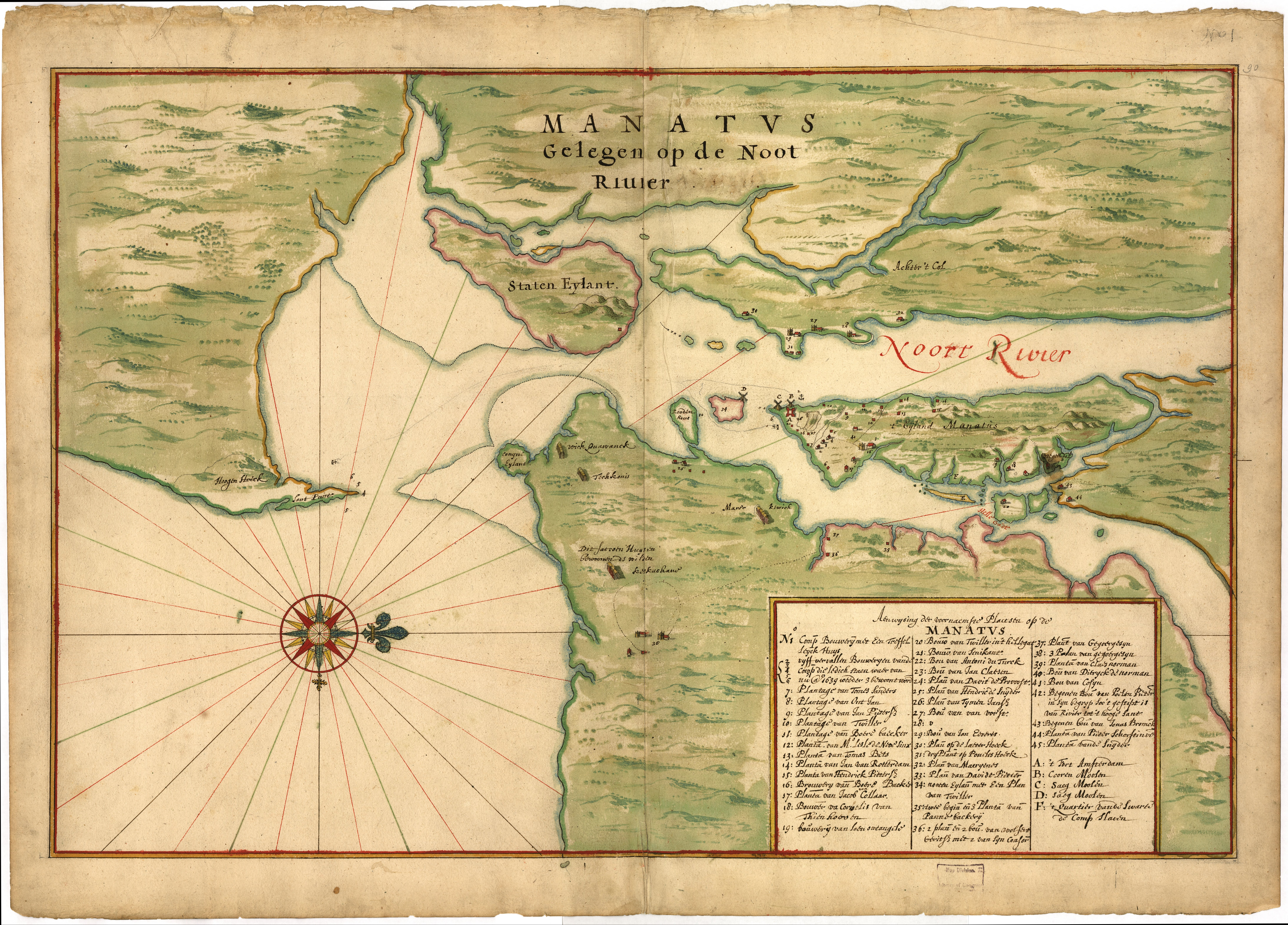
Map (around 1639) Manhattan situated on the North Rivier with numbered key showing settlements: 27. Farm (Bou=Bouwerij= (Modern Dutch) boerderij = farm) of Van Vorst; 28. "v" (sic): 29. Farm of Jan Everts; 30. Plantation at "de Laeter Hoeck"; 31. Plantation at Paulus Hook ("Poueles Hoeck"); 32. Plantation of "Maeryenes".

The area encompassed by Pauw's holdings on Bergen Neck likely included the eight miles (13 km) of shore line on each of the Hudson and Hackensack Rivers from Bergen Point to today's Bergen County line. His agent set up a small factorij and ferry slip at Arresick on the tidal island that stills bears his anglicized name, Paulus Hook. He operated an intermittent ferry and traded with the local Lenape population. By 1630 a plantation worked by African slaves had been set up. Pauw, however, failed to fulfill the condition of establishing a community of at least 50 permanent settlers and was required to re-sell his speculative acquisition back to the company. They commissioned construction of a homestead at Gemoenepaen for their representative Jan Evertsen Bout during 1633. During 1634 a homestead was built at Ahasimus for Cornelius Van Vorst, whose later descendants would play a prominent role in the development of Jersey City. Abraham Isaacsen Verplanck received a land patent for Paulus Hook on May 1, 1638. A small farm went up at Kewan Punt. The leasehold of Aert Van Putten at Hobuk (Hoboken) was the site of North America's first brewery. Another patroonship was established farther up the river at Vriessendael. Although the settlements were small, they were strategic in that they were a foothold on the west bank of what had been named the North River across from New Amsterdam and were important trading-posts for the settlers and indigenous people, who dealt in valuable beaver pelts, and they were early attempts at populating the newly claimed territory.

== Pavonia Massacre ==
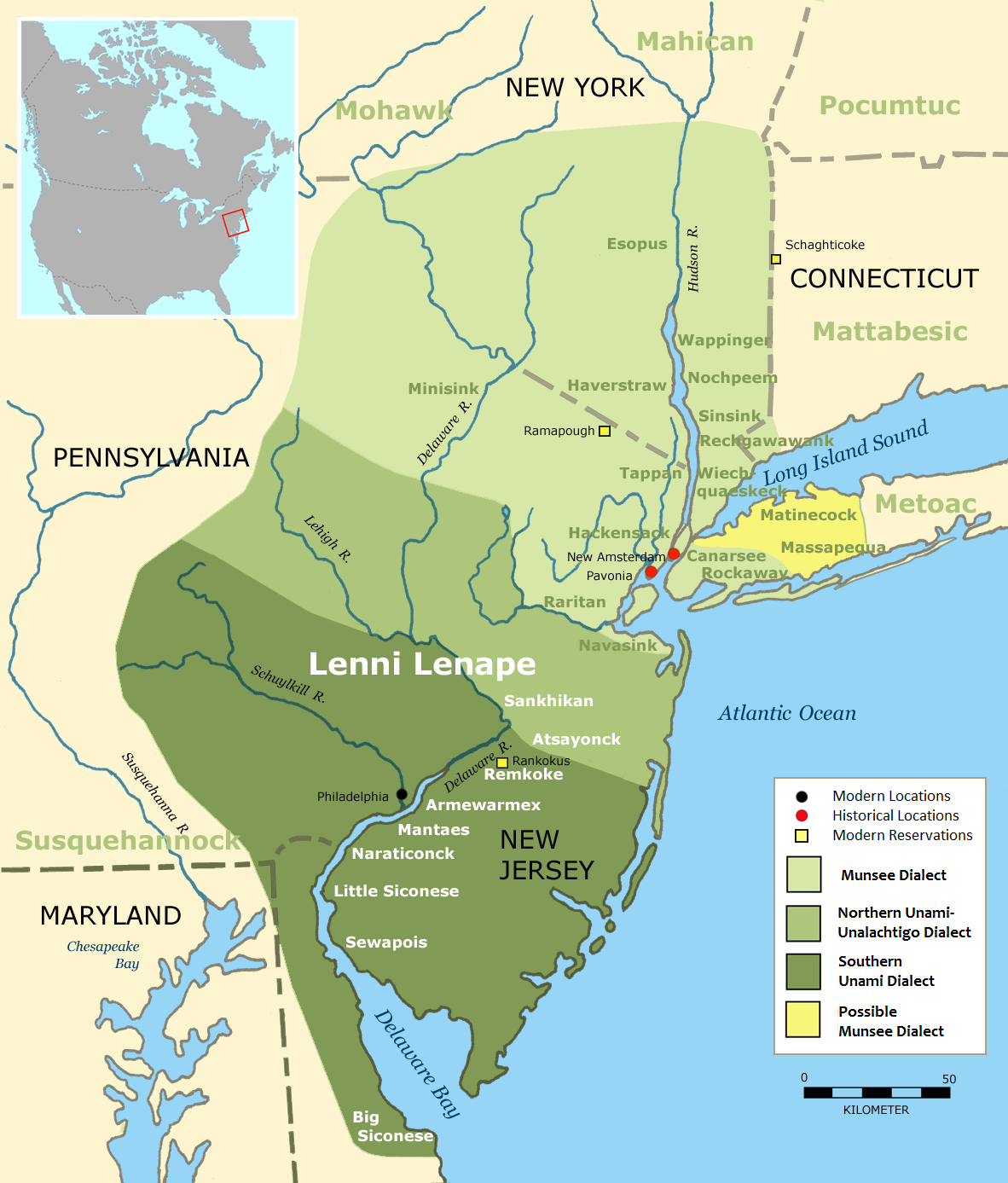
Various groups, united after the massacre at Pavonia and Kieft's War, affected the entire province.

Relations between the Netherlanders and the Lenape were tenuous. Trade agreements, land ownership, familial and societal structures were misunderstood and misconstrued by both parties. Language differences most likely did not help matters. These conflicts led to rising tensions and eventually an incident that started a series of raids and reprisals, known as Kieft's War.

Willem Kieft arrived in New Netherland in 1639 to take up his appointment as Director of New Netherland, with a directive to increase profits from the port at Pavonia. His solution was to attempt to exact tribute from the native peoples with claims that the money would buy them protection from rival groups. It was not uncommon among the native population to do so, but in this case his demands were ignored.

At the time, the settlers in New Amsterdam were in intermittent conflict with their native Raritan and Wappinger neighbors. On Staten Island, Dutch soldiers routed an encampment in retaliation for the theft of pigs, later discovered to have been stolen by other settlers. The death of a Dutch wheelwright, Claes Swits, at the hands of a Weckquaesgeek (Wappinger on the east side of the Hudson River) particularly angered many of the Dutch when the tribe would not surrender the murderer. At Achter Kol, in revenge for a theft, a Dutchman was shot with arrows while roofing a new house.

Kieft decided, against the advice of the council of Twelve Men, to punish the native population who had taken refuge among the Netherlanders (their presumed allies), when fleeing raiding Mahican from the north, by attacking Pavonia and Corlear's Hook. The initial strike which he ordered on February 25, 1643, and took place at Communipaw, was a massacre: 129 Dutch soldiers killed 120 Native Americans, including women and children. Historians differ on whether or not the massacre was Kieft's idea. This is sometimes referred to as the Pavonia Massacre. The same night also saw a similar if smaller attack in Manhattan, the Massacre at Corlears Hook. Native Americans call it "The Slaughter of the Innocents". This attack united the Algonquian peoples in the surrounding areas, to an extent not seen before. On October 1, 1643, a force of united "tribes" attacked the homesteads at Pavonia, most of which were burned to the ground. Many settlers were killed and those who survived were ordered to the relative safety of New Amsterdam. Pavonia was evacuated.

For the next two years during what became known as Kieft's War the united tribes harassed settlers all across New Netherland, killing sporadically and suddenly. The sparse European forces were helpless to stop the attacks, but the natives were kept too spread apart to mount more effective strikes. Finally a truce was agreed upon during August 1645, in part brokered by the Hackensack sachem, Oratam. Kieft was recalled to the Netherlands to answer for his conduct in 1647, but he died in a shipwreck before his version of events could be told. The war was extremely bloody in proportion to the population at the time: more than 1,600 natives were killed at a time when the European population of New Amsterdam was only 250. The uneasy truce with the Lenape allowed for further settlement, including Constable Hook (1646) and Awiehawken (1647).

== Peach War and Bergen ==
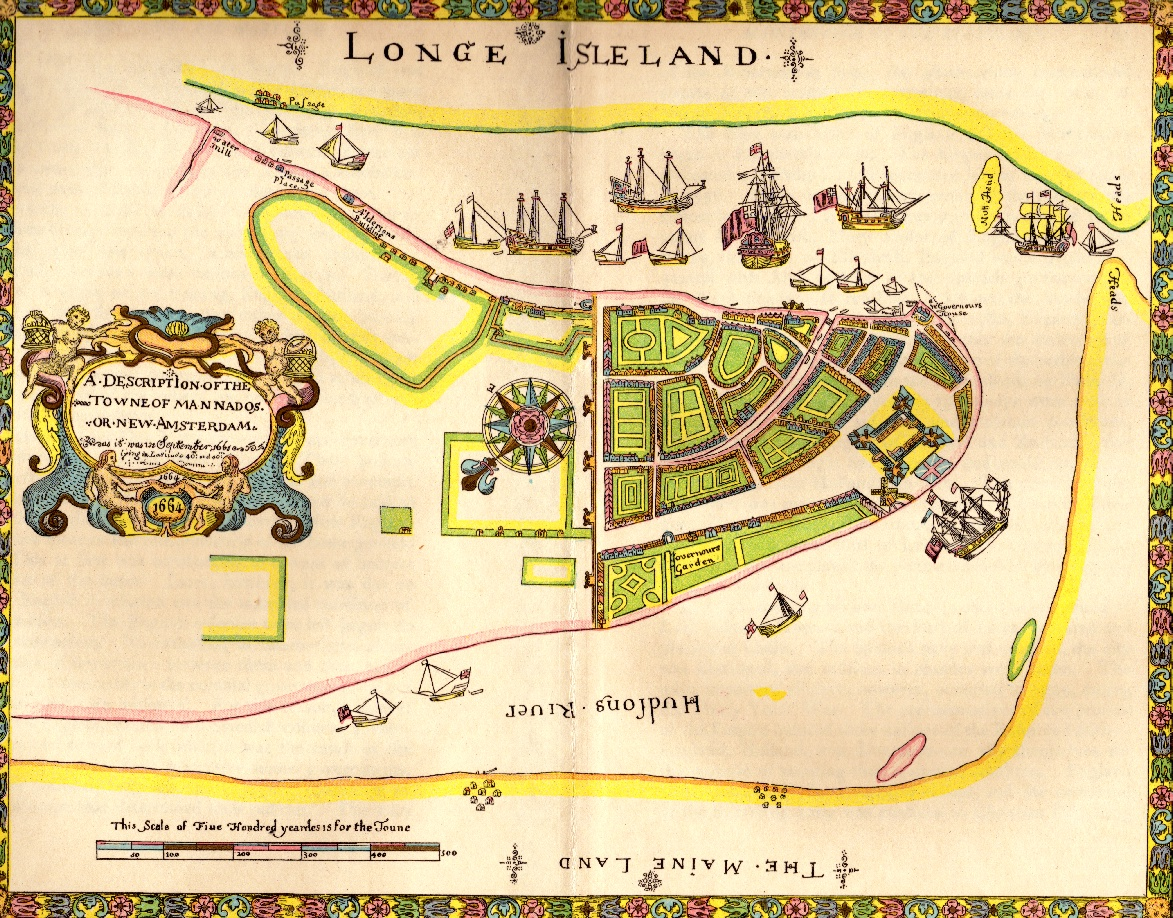
1664 Duke's Plan includes depictions of either Harsimus, Paulus Hook, or Communipaw at time of the surrender of Fort Amsterdam. Bergen was farther inland atop Bergen Hill. Ellis Island and Liberty Island are seen lower right.

Kieft's successor was Peter Stuyvesant. During 1653 Pavonia became part of the newly formed Commonality of New Amsterdam. In late 1654 a series of grants were made for tracts "achter de Kol" or Achter Col at Pamrapo, Minkakwa, and Kewan. The colony grew and the situation remained relatively peaceful until 1655, when Pavonia and Staten Island were attacked by a united band of approximately five hundred Lenape. 50 settlers were killed. Over one hundred were taken hostage and held at Paulus Hook until their release could be negotiated. This incident is known as the Peach War, and is said to have been precipitated by the killing of a young Lenape woman who had stolen a peach from a settler's orchard on Manhattan Island, but may have been in response to the Dutch attack on New Sweden, the Lenape's trading partner on the Delaware River.

During 1658, wishing to further formalize agreements with the Lenape, Stuyvesant agreed to "re-purchase" the area "by the great rock above Wiehacken," then taking in the sweep of land on the peninsula west of the Hudson and east of the Hackensack River extending down to the Kill Van Kull in Bayonne. A mural that adorns the atrium of the Hudson County Courthouse depicts this transaction: On January 30, 1658, the Peninsula between the Hudson and Hackensack rivers south from Weehawken was finally purchased from the Indians and granted to the inhabitants of Bergen in the Year 1661. A new village at today's Bergen Square was founded by settlers who wished to return to the west bank of the Hudson giving it the name Bergen, which would refer to its situation. The word berg taken from the Dutch means hill, while bergen means place of safety. Its semi-independent government was granted on September 5, 1661, by Stuyvesant, as part of his efforts re-gain a foothold on the North River's western shore and expand beyond New Amsterdam on the southern tip of Manhattan, under the condition that a garrison be built. Located atop Bergen Hill, it was part of the original patroonship, close to the southern end of the Hudson Palisades. It was the first self-governing European settlement in what would become the state of New Jersey.

During 1664, Fort Amsterdam and, by extension, all of New Netherland was peacefully surrendered to the British. For the next ten years it was traded at the negotiating table and, for a short period, recaptured. The Dutch Empire finally relinquished control with the Treaty of Westminster during 1675. Bergen's charter was renewed by the government of East Jersey and the area retained its Dutch character for years.

== Modern Pavonia ==
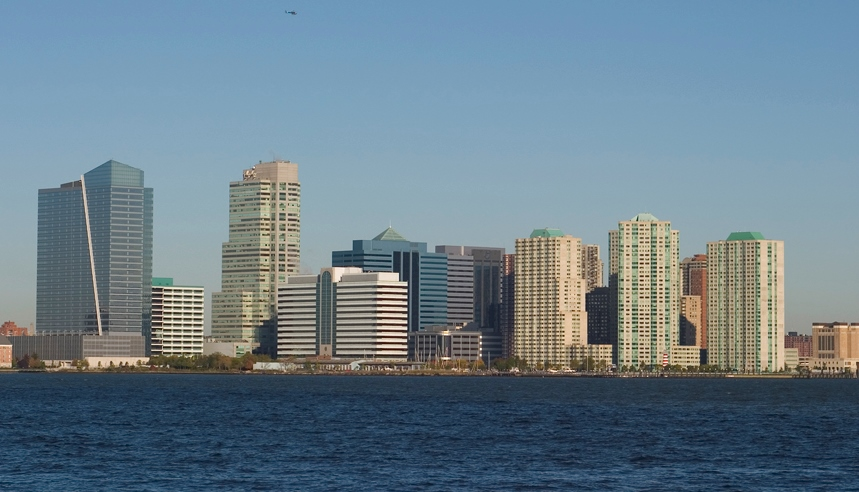
Newport, built on the previously landfilled Harsimus Cove from the Hudson River

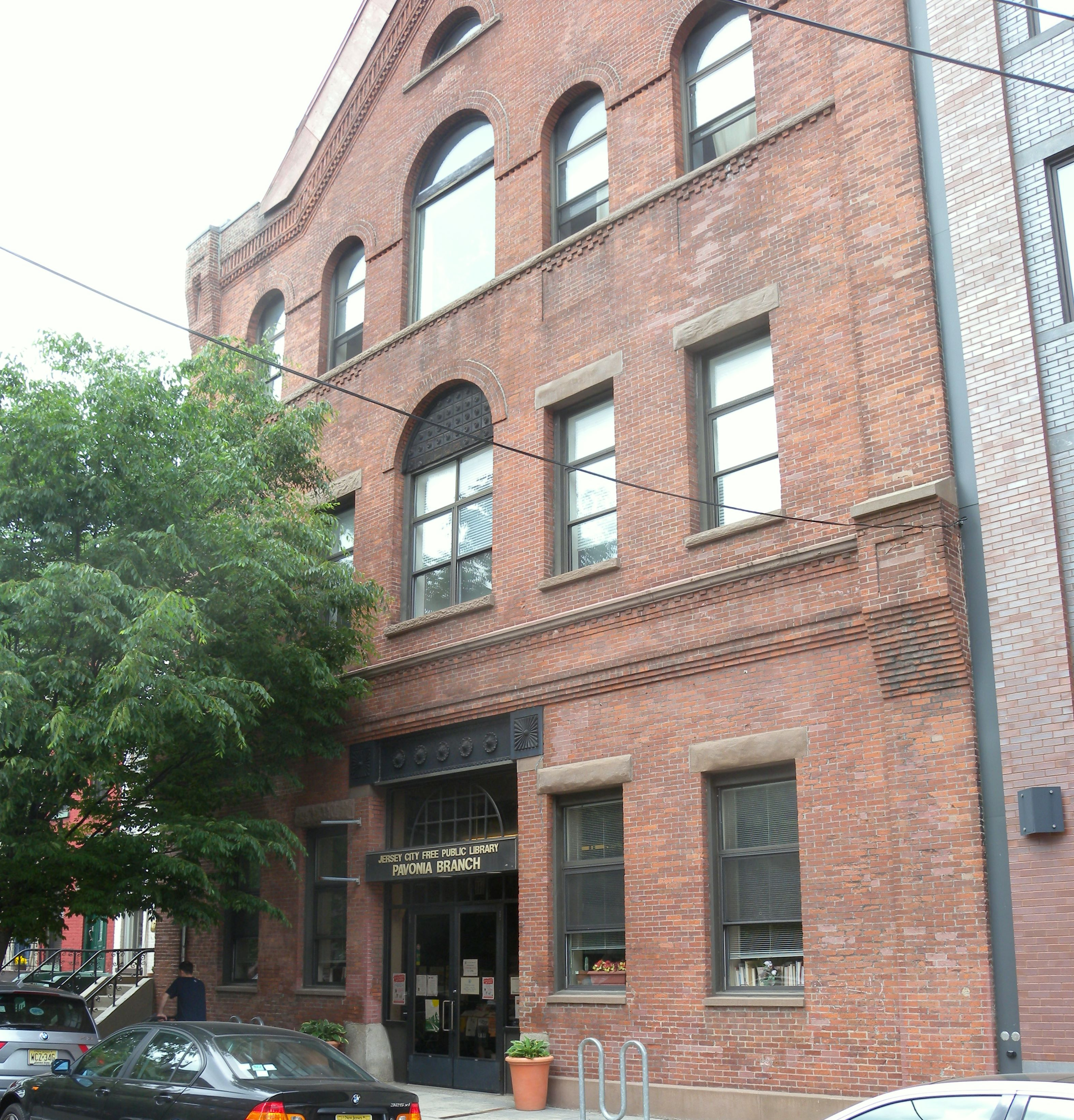
Pavonia branch library

Although the entire region was originally Pavonia, the name now tends to be associated with the former Jersey City area of the Horseshoe encompassing Harsimus Cove, Hamilton Park, and WALDO-Powerhouse. Since the 1980s the former site of the Erie Railroad's Hudson waterfront Pavonia Terminal and the Pavonia Ferry has been redeveloped as Newport. The PATH rapid transit system's Newport Station, formerly called Pavonia, and the Hudson Bergen Light Rail Pavonia-Newport station are in this section of the city.

Pavonia Avenue is a street interrupted in sections as it runs east-west in Pavonia Newport, at Hamilton Park, in Journal Square, and in the Marion Section. Pavonia Court, at the Newark Bay in Bayonne has its name from the Pavonia Yacht Club established during 1859 on the New York Bay. There is also a Pavonia Avenue in Kearny. Saint Peter's College, located on land that was part of the patroonship, has as its mascot a peacock, to which its publications make reference: Pauw Wow (newspaper), Pavan (literary magazine), Peacock Pie (yearbook). There is also a Pavonia Branch of the Jersey City Free Public Library. The Pavonia Yard streetcar depot was located near Five Corners. The Pavonia Yard, located in Camden, was operated by the Pennsylvania Railroad, which also maintained terminals and yards in Downtown Jersey City.

== See also ==
- Achter Col
- Bergen Township, New Jersey (pre-1862)
- Patroon
- Rensselaerswyck
- Vriessendael
- Zwaanendael
- New Netherland settlements
- Toponymy of Bergen, New Netherland

== Sources ==
- de Vries, David Pietersz Korte historiael ende Journaels Aenteykeninge, van verscheyden voyagiens in de vier deelen des wereldts-ronde, als Europa, Africa, Asia, ende America gedaen (in Dutch. Hoorn, Netherlands, 1655. ) in Dutch
- van Balen, W.B.J. Holland aan de Hudson (Amsterdam, Netherlands, 1943) in Dutch
- Goodwin, Maud Wilder. Dutch and English on the Hudson : a chronicle of colonial New York (New Haven : Yale University Press. 1919)
- Winfield, Charles Hardenburg. History of the County of Hudson, New Jersey, from Its Earliest Settlement to the Present Time (New York: Kennard & Hay. 1874)
- Bergen Township, Past and Present
- Jersey City's Colonial Background
- Overview of Hudson County Heritage
- Bergen County Historic Society
