= Kieft's War =

Conflict in 1643-45 between Dutch colonists and Lenape Indians

- Part of the American Indian Wars
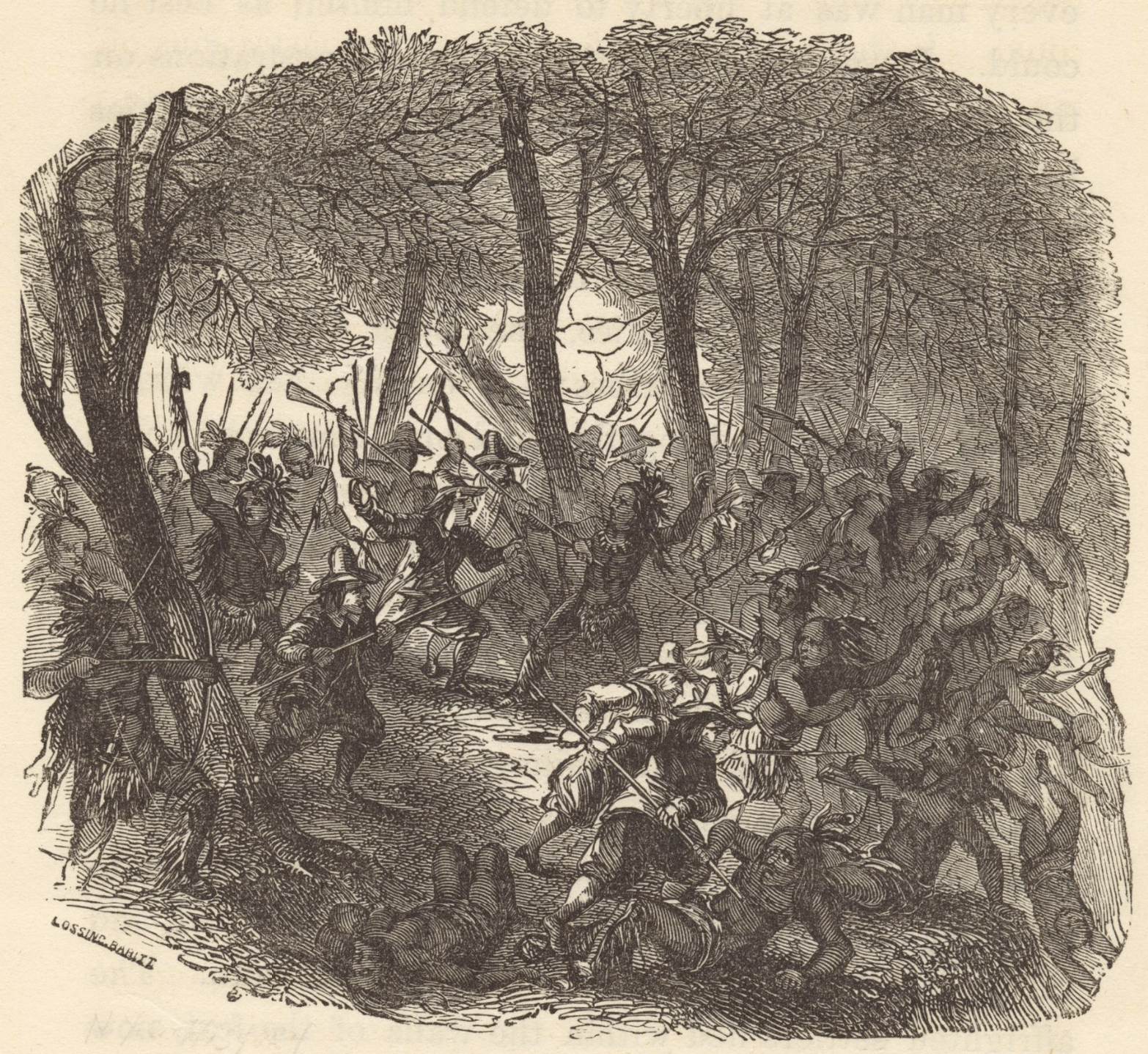
- Massacre of Indians at Pavonia; Benson John Lossing, 1859
Date	February 23, 1643 – August 1645
Location	Vicinity of present-day New York, Staten Island, and Hackensack, New Jersey
Result	Dutch victory

Belligerents
New Netherland; Mohawk people	Main tribes: Algonquian; Mohicans; Raritans; Wappinger; Lenape; Other Indians of the northern Atlantic seacoast

Commanders and leaders
Willem Kieft	Shawanórõckquot

Strength
Unknown	Around more than 1,600 Indian warriors

Casualties and losses
Fewer than 100 dead	1,600 dead

Kieft's War (1643–1645), also known as the Wappinger War, was a conflict between the colonial province of New Netherland and the Wappinger and Lenape Indians in what is now New York and New Jersey. It is named for Director-General of New Netherland Willem Kieft, who had ordered an attack without the approval of his advisory council and against the wishes of the colonists. Dutch colonists attacked Lenape camps and massacred the inhabitants, which encouraged unification among the regional Algonquian tribes against the Dutch and precipitated waves of attacks on both sides. This was one of the earliest conflicts between settlers and Indians in the region. The Dutch West India Company was displeased with Kieft and recalled him, but he died in a shipwreck while returning to the Netherlands; Peter Stuyvesant succeeded him in New Netherland. Numerous Dutch settlers returned to the Netherlands because of the continuing threat from the Algonquians, and growth slowed in the colony.

== Background ==
The Dutch West India Company appointed Kieft as a director without evident experience or qualifications for the job; he might have been established through family political connections. He arrived in New Netherland in April 1638. The Massachusetts Bay Colony, Plymouth Colony, Saybrook Colony, Mohegan Indians, and Narragansett Indians had defeated the Dutch-allied Pequot tribe during the Pequot War (1636–1638), which eased the way for the English to take over the northern reaches of New Netherland along the Connecticut River. Peter Minuit had been director-general of New Netherland. Still, he left two weeks before Kieft's arrival to establish New Sweden in the poorly developed southern reaches of the colony along the Delaware Valley.

New Netherland had begun to flourish along the Hudson River. The Dutch West India Company ran the settlement chiefly for trading, with the director-general exercising unchecked corporate authority backed by soldiers. New Amsterdam and the other settlements of the Hudson Valley had developed beyond company towns into a growing colony. In 1640, the Company surrendered its trade monopoly on the colony and declared New Netherland a free-trade zone, and Kieft was suddenly governor of a booming economy.

== Skirmishing ==
Kieft's first plan to reduce costs was to solicit tribute payments from the tribes living in the region. Long-time colonists warned him against this course, but he pursued it, nonetheless. Tribal chiefs rejected the idea. Pigs were stolen from the farm of David Pietersz. de Vries, so Kieft sent soldiers to raid a Raritan village on Staten Island, killing multiple people. The Raritan band retaliated by burning down de Vries' farmhouse and killing four of his employees, so Kieft offered bounty payments to rival tribes for the heads of Raritans. Colonists later determined that de Vries' pigs had been stolen by other colonists. In August 1641, a Weckquaesgeek Indian killed Claes Swits, an elderly Dutch immigrant who ran a public house frequented by settlers and Indians alike in Turtle Bay, Manhattan. Another incident occurred at Achter Kol along the banks of the Hackensack River. Settlers and some Hackensacks had been drinking alcohol at a trading post when a conflict arose over a missing coat which ended in the death of the post's foreman.

The colonists resisted Kieft's Indian initiatives, so he tried to use the Swits incident to build popular support for war. He created the Council of Twelve Men to advise him, and it was the first popularly elected body in the New Netherlands colony. The council was alarmed about the consequences of Kieft's proposed crusade, as they had lived in peace with the Indians for nearly two decades, and they rejected his proposal to massacre the Weckquaesgeek village if the villagers refused to produce the Swits murderer.

The Indians were far more numerous than the colonists and could easily take reprisals against their lives and property. They also supplied the furs and pelts that were the economic lifeblood of the colony. The council sought to dissuade Kieft from war, and they began to advise him on other matters, using the new Council to carry the interests of colonists to the corporate rulers. They called for establishing a permanent representative body to manage local affairs, and Kieft responded by dissolving the council and issuing a decree forbidding them to meet or assemble.

Kieft sent a punitive expedition to attack the village of the Indian who had murdered Swits, but the militia got lost. He then accepted the peace offerings of Weckquaesgeek elders. He then launched an attack on camps of refugee Weckquaesgeek and Tappan on February 23, 1643, two weeks after dissolving the council. Mahican and Mohawk Indians in the north had driven them south the year before, armed with guns traded by French and English colonists, and the Tappans sought protection by the Dutch. Kieft refused aid despite the company's previous guarantees to the tribes to provide it. The refugees made camp at Communipaw in Jersey City and lower Manhattan.

== Pavonia Massacre ==
Colonists from New Netherland descended on the camps at Pavonia on February 25, 1643, and killed 120 Indians, including women and children. De Vries described the events in his journal:

Infants were torn from their mother's breasts and hacked to pieces in the presence of their parents, and pieces thrown into the fire and in the water, and other sucklings, being bound to small boards, were cut, stuck, and pierced, and miserably massacred in a manner to move a heart of stone. Some were thrown into the river, and when the fathers and mothers endeavored to save them, the soldiers would not let them come on land but made both parents and children drown.

About 40 were killed in a similar attack the same night in the Massacre at Corlears Hook.

Historians differ on whether Kieft had planned such a massacre or a more contained raid, but all sources agree that he rewarded the soldiers for their deeds. The attacks united the Algonquian peoples in the surrounding areas against the Dutch.

== Two years of war ==
The Dutch began to greatly further arm the Mohawk in 1643 as their allies. In late 1643, a force of 1,500 Indians invaded New Netherland and killed many, including Anne Hutchinson, a chief figure in the Antinomian Controversy which ruptured the Massachusetts Bay Colony years earlier. The Indians destroyed villages and farms, the work of two decades of settlement, and Dutch forces killed 500 Weckquaesgeek Indians that winter in retaliation. New Amsterdam became crowded with destitute refugees, and the colonists increasingly resisted Kieft's rule. They flouted paying new taxes that he ordered, and many people began to leave by ship. Kieft hired Captain John Underhill, who recruited militia on Long Island to go against the Indians there and in Connecticut. His forces killed more than 1,000 Indians, including 500 to 700 in the Pound Ridge Massacre.

The colonists wrote letters to the directors of the Dutch West India Company and the Dutch Republic requesting intervention, but they produced no result. Many then banded together to formally petition for the removal of Kieft, writing: "We sit here among thousands of wild and barbarian people, in whom neither consolation nor mercy can be found; we left our dear fatherland, and if God the Lord were not our comfort we would perish in our misery." For the next two years, the united tribes harassed settlers throughout New Netherland. The sparse colonial forces were helpless to stop the attacks, but the Indians were too spread out to mount more effective strikes. The two sides finally agreed to a truce when the last of the 69 united tribes joined in August 1645.

== Outcome ==
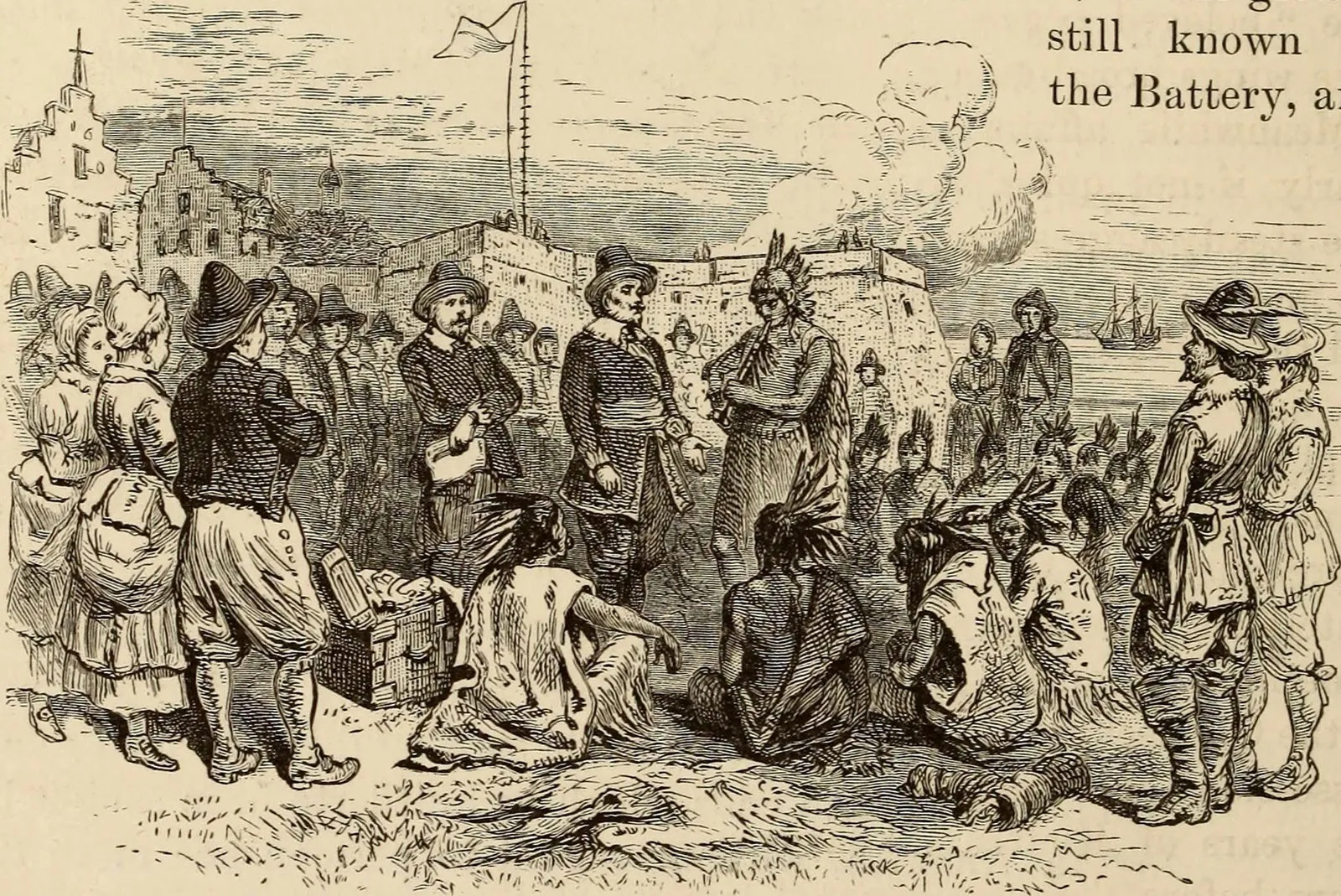
Willem Kieft smoking a peace pipe with an Algonquian Chief after the war at New Amsterdam, 1645. The bystanders are New Netherland citizens and natives

The outcome is regarded as favourable to the Dutch since the colony's safety was eventually assured, and the siege of New Amsterdam was lifted, after a great offense which devastated the Indians. However, the Indian attacks caused many settlers to return to Europe, The Dutch West India Company blamed Kieft for the war, and the dead settlers. They recalled Kieft to the Netherlands in 1647 to answer for his conduct, but he died in a shipwreck near Swansea, Wales. The company named Peter Stuyvesant as his successor, and he managed New Netherland until it was ceded to the English.

== See also ==
- Esopus Wars
- Maryn Adriansen
- Peach War
- List of conflicts in the United States
