= Directors of New Netherland =

This is a list of directors, appointed by the Dutch West India Company, of the 17th century Dutch province of New Netherland (Nieuw-Nederland in Dutch) in North America. Only the last, Peter Stuyvesant, held the title of Director-General. As the colony grew, citizens advisory boards – known as the Twelve Men, Eight Men, and Nine Men – exerted more influence on the director and thus affairs of province.

There were New Netherland settlements in what later became the US states of New York, New Jersey, and Delaware, with short-lived outposts in areas of today's Connecticut, Rhode Island, and Pennsylvania. The capital, New Amsterdam, became the city of New York when the New Netherlanders provisionally ceded control of the colony to the English, who renamed the city and the rest of the province in June 1665.

During the restitution to Dutch rule from August 1673 to November 1674, when New Netherland was under the jurisdiction of the City of Amsterdam, the first Dutch governor, Anthony Colve, was appointed.

== List of directors ==
=== From 1624–1664 ===
Portrait	Director or director-general	Took office	Left office	Notes
	Cornelius Jacobsen May (fl. 1600s)	1624	1625	Explored Delaware Bay, New York Bay, Hudson River.; Established base at Nut Island (Noten Eylandt) and outposts including Fort Nassau on Delaware River.; Cape May was named in his honor.
	Willem Verhulst (or van der Hulst) (fl. 1600s)	1625	1626	Initiated construction of Fort Amsterdam on southern tip of Manhattan Island, and Fort Wilhelmus on the Delaware River.; Unpopular with the colonists, he was quickly replaced.; Adrian Jorisszen Tienpoint was his deputy
Portrait of Peter Minuit	Peter Minuit (1580–1638)	1626	1631	Purchased the island of Manhattan from Native Americans on May 24, 1626 for 60 Dutch guilders worth of goods.
	Sebastiaen Jansen Krol (1595–1674)	1632	1633	
portrait of Wouter van Twiller by Washington Allston	Wouter van Twiller (1606–1654)	1633	1638	Previously a Dutch West India Company warehouse clerk, used family connections to the Rensselaer family to gain appointment; purchased Nut Island (Noten Eylant), later called Governor's Island from Canarsee tribe for two axeheads, a string of beads and iron nails; Lost the colony's claim of the Connecticut River valley to New England settlers; Pushed back encroaching Virginia settlers who tried to settle Delaware River valley
Portrait of Willem Kieft	Willem Kieft (1597–1647)	1638	1647	Attempted to drive out Lenape tribe.; Attacks on Pavonia and Corlears Hook, led to Kieft's War.; Fired by the Dutch West India Company in 1647.; Died at sea near Swansea, Wales on September 27, 1647 while returning to Amsterdam aboard the Princess Amelia.
Portrait of Peter Stuyvesant	Peter Stuyvesant (c. 1612–1672)	1647	1664	Authorized charter for Communipaw and Bergen (now Jersey City) in 1660.; New Amsterdam, Pavonia, and Staten Island attacked by the Munsee during the brief Peach War (1655); obtained victory the Esopus Wars against the Lenape and Esopus tribes; Surrendered New Netherland to the English.; Also the director of Curaçao (1642–1664)

=== Restoration of the colony, 1673–1674 ===
In 1673, during the Third Anglo-Dutch War, the Dutch were able to recapture New Amsterdam (renamed "New York" by the English) under Admiral Cornelis Evertsen the Youngest and Captain Anthony Colve. Evertsen renamed the city "New Orange." Evertsen returned to the Netherlands in July 1674, and was accused of disobeying his orders. Evertsen had been instructed not to retake New Amsterdam but instead to conquer the English colonies of Saint Helena and Cayenne (now French Guiana). In 1674, the Dutch were compelled to relinquish New Amsterdam to the English under the terms of the Second Treaty of Westminster.

Portrait	Governor	Took office	Left office	Notes
	Anthony Colve (1644–1693)	1673	1674	Colve's authority was brief, starting with the taking of New York, but ended on 10 November 1674 to implement the provisions of the Treaty of Westminster, which restored the colony to the English. News did not reach the New World of the treaty's terms until late in the year. The new English governor Edmund Andros only arrived in November 1674.

== See also ==
- Joris Andringa
- Johan Björnsson Printz
- List of colonial governors of Delaware
- List of colonial governors of New Jersey
- List of colonial governors of New York
- Dutch colonization of the Americas
- List of mayors of New York City
- History of New York City
- New Amsterdam judicial system
