= Willem Kieft =

Dutch colonial governor (1597–1647)

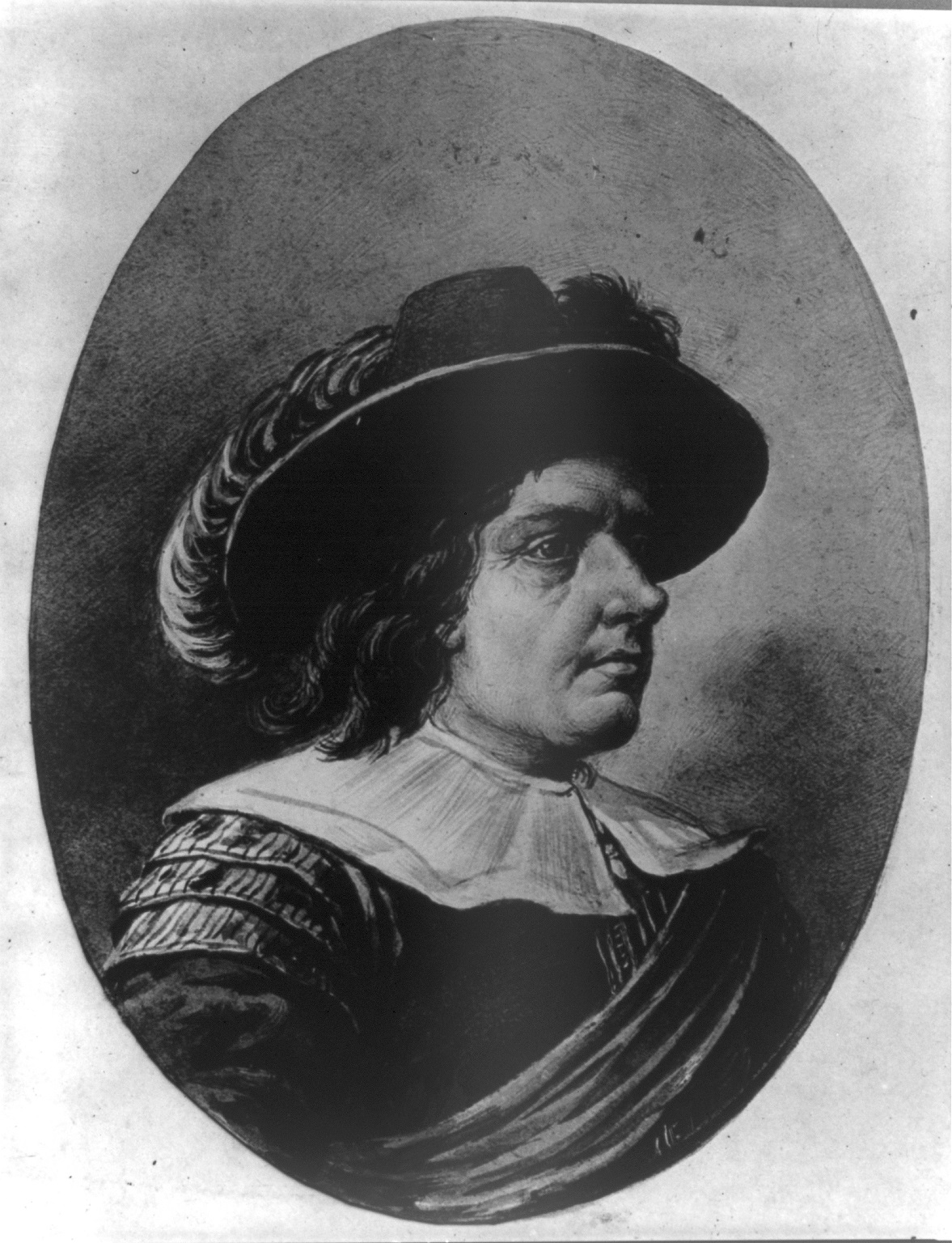
- Willem (Wilhelm) Kieft, reproduction of a painting

6th Director of New Netherland
- In office 1638–1647
- Preceded by: Wouter van Twiller
- Succeeded by: Peter Stuyvesant

Personal details
- Born: September 1597 Amsterdam
- Died: September 27, 1647 (aged 49–50) Princess Amelia, near Swansea, Wales
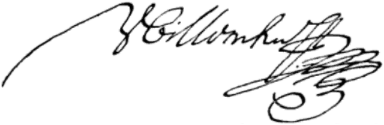
- Signature

Willem Kieft, also Wilhelm Kieft, (September 1597 – September 27, 1647) was a Dutch merchant and the Director of New Netherland (of which New Amsterdam was the capital) from 1638 to 1647.

== Life and career ==
The handwritten Journal of New Netherland 1647 by an unknown Dutch colonist, from the manuscript collections of the National Library of the Netherlands, is an important source for the study of Kieft's governorship, the war, and New Netherland in the 1640s.

Willem Kieft was appointed to the rank of director by the Dutch West India Company in 1638. He formed the council of twelve men, the first representative body in New Netherland, but ignored its advice.

He tried to tax, and then drive out, local Native Americans. He ordered attacks on Pavonia and Corlears Hook on February 25, 1643, which erupted into a horrific massacre (129 Dutch soldiers killed 120 Indians, including women and children). The Dutch local citizen advisory group had been specifically against such a raid, and were aghast when they heard the details. This was followed by retaliations resulting in what would become known as Kieft's War (1643–1645). The war took a huge toll on both sides, and the directors of the Dutch West India Company dismissed him in 1647. Peter Stuyvesant succeeded Kieft in office.

Kieft died on September 27, 1647, in the Princess Amelia shipwreck near Swansea, Wales, en route to Amsterdam to defend himself, along with many of his opponents, including the Rev. Everardus Bogardus. His archive was also lost, so his exact role cannot be established apart from what his opponents wrote of him.

== Legacy ==
He is depicted in the Gods of Manhattan series by Scott Mebus.

== See also ==
- Land of the Blacks (Manhattan)
- Colonial America
- Dutch colonization of the Americas
- Dutch Empire
- List of colonial governors of New Jersey
- List of colonial governors of New York

Government offices
Preceded by Wouter van Twiller	Director of New Netherland; 1638—1647	Succeeded by Peter Stuyvesant
