= Unalachtigo Lenape =

Unalachtigo
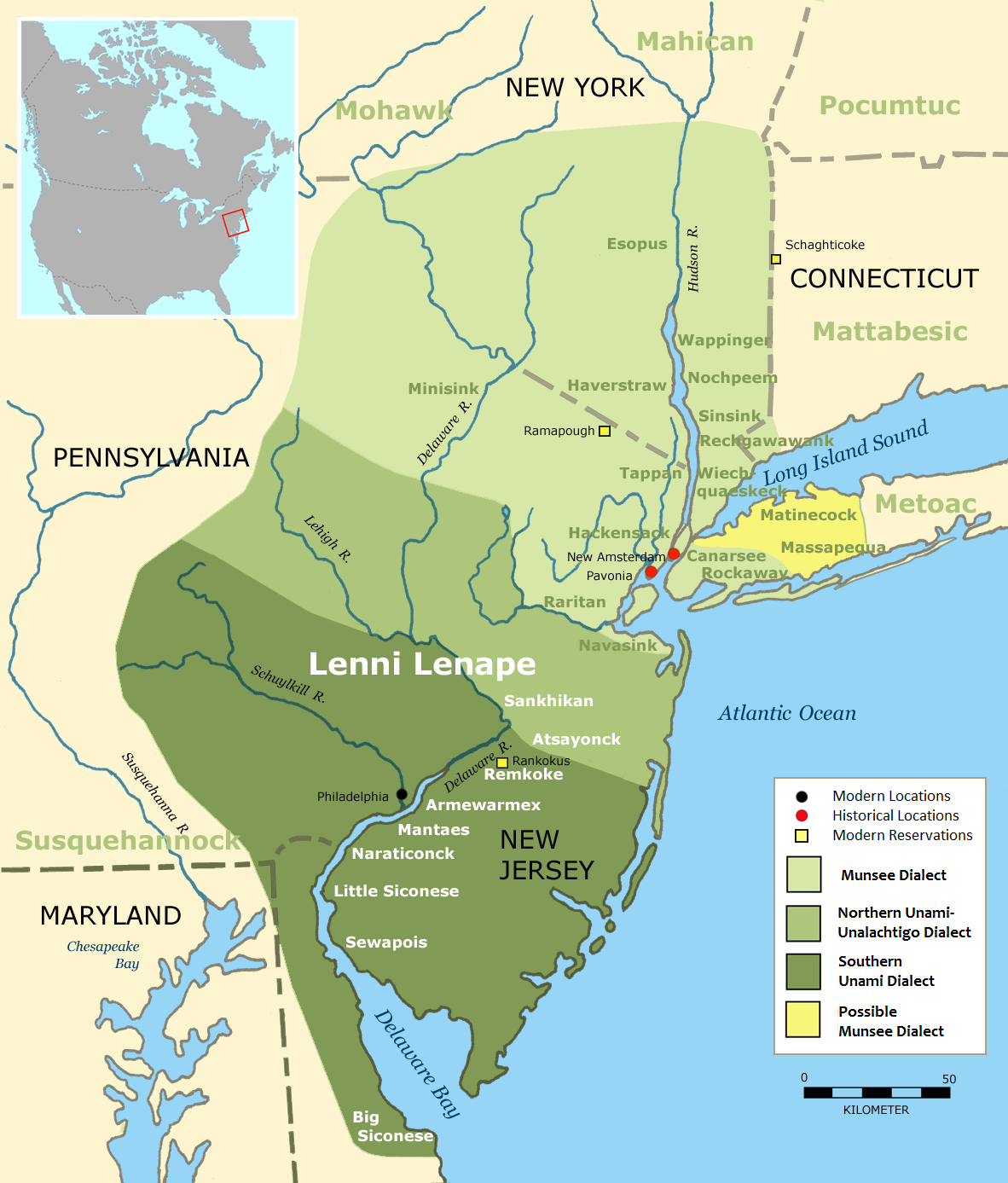
- Lenapehoking, the original Lenape territory. The Unalachtigo are from the southern region in dark green

Regions with significant populations
- United States (New Jersey)

Languages
- English, formerly Unami

Religion
- traditional tribal religion

Related ethnic groups
- Other Lenape

The Unalachtigo were a division of the Lenape (Delaware Indians), a Native American tribe whose homeland Lenapehoking (Note: Lenapehoking is not a historical term, but was coined to describe the area in 1984 by Nora Thompson Dean ("Touching Leaves"), a Delaware elder and Lenape speaker, for a study by Herbert C. Kraft.) was in what is today the Northeastern United States. They were part of the Forks Indians.

The name was a Munsee language term for the Unami-speakers of west-central New Jersey. Moravian missionaries called the Lenape people of the Forks region near Easton, Pennsylvania "Unami," and the Northern Unami language-speakers in New Jersey "Unalachtigo." It is debated whether Unalachtigo constituted a distinct dialect of Unami. Unalachtigo words were recorded in 17th-century vocabulary drawn from the Sankhikan band of Lenape in New Jersey.

The Sankhikan band were enemies of the Manhattan people, who spoke Munsee.

== Synonymy ==
"Unalachtigo" probably came from the term wə̆nálâhtko·w, which according to Ives Goddard has an unknown translation. Some sources translate unalachtigo as meaning "people who live near the ocean", or "people who live down by the water" Other spellings include Unalâchtigo (1818) and Wunalàchtigo (1798).

== History ==
Linguist Ives Goddard has determined that the Unalachtigo had their origins around the Lehigh Valley of Pennsylvania, and adjacent portions of New Jersey. They spoke a Northern Unami or Southern Unami dialect of Lënape.

== Recent events ==
An organization called the Unalachtigo Band of the Nanticoke Lenni Lenape Nation claims descent from the Lenape of the Brotherton Reservation, an 18th-century Indian reservation, near Shamong Township in Burlington County, New Jersey. The group unsuccessfully filed for federal recognition with the Bureau of Indian Affairs on 1 Feb 2002. In 2005, the Unalachtigo Band of the Nanticoke Lenni Lenape Nation and their tribal chairman James Brent Thomas Sr. sued the State of New Jersey and Governor Donald DiFrancesco for restoration of the Brotherton Reservation lands and the expulsion of non-Indian peoples. Their complaint was dismissed by the Superior Court of New Jersey.
