= Nyack Tract =

Lenape settlement in New York City

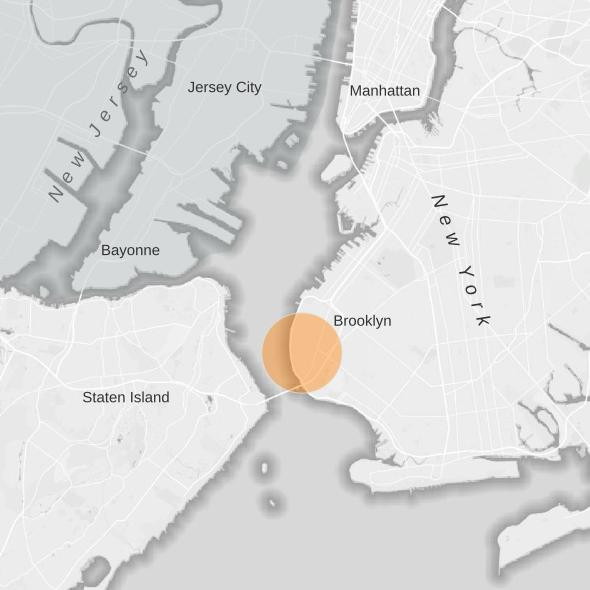
Area of Nyack Tract shown within Brooklyn, New York

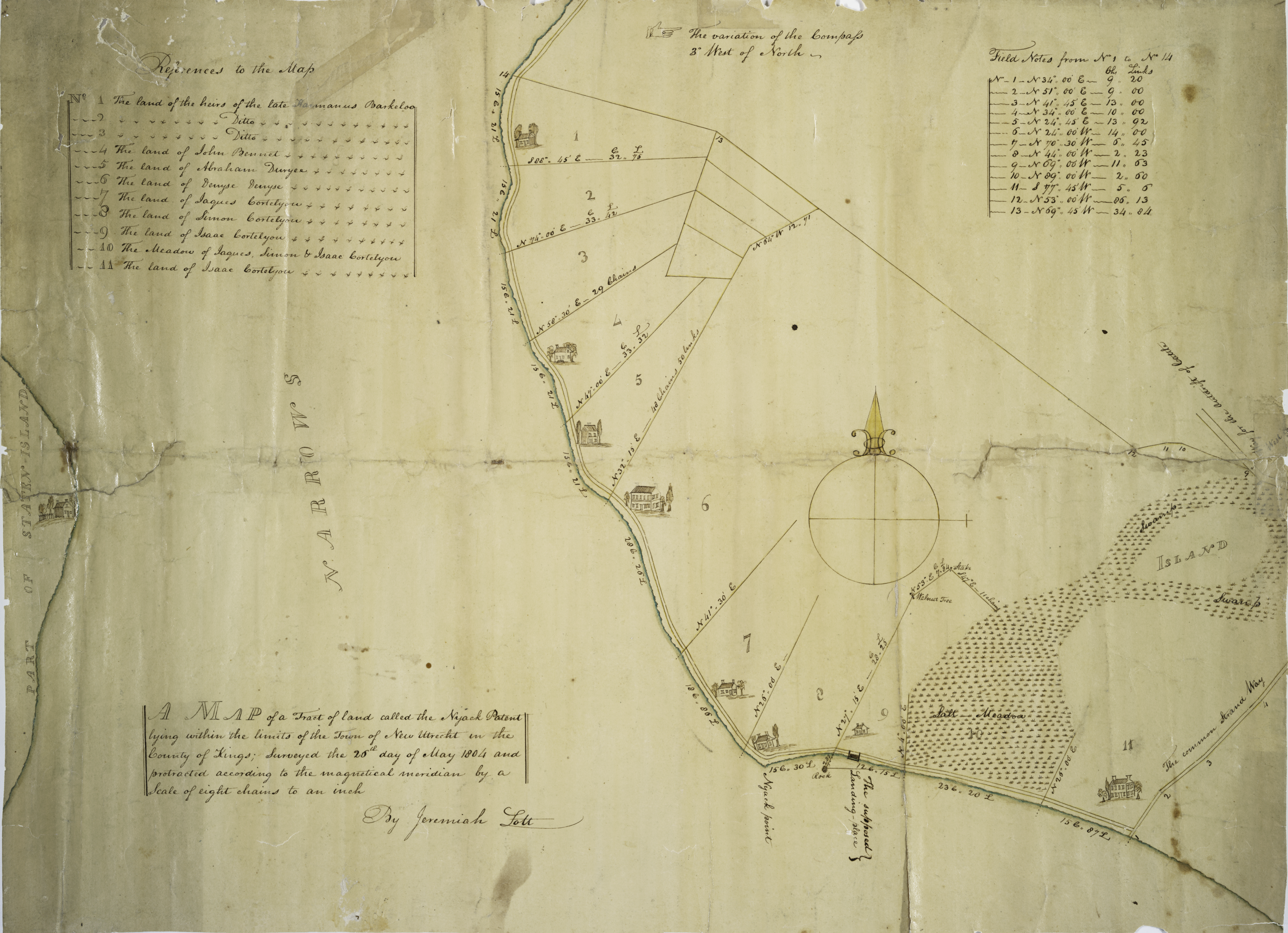
"Nyack Patent", 1804 map, with "Nyack Point" on Lower New York Bay, and an "island" in the midst of the inland salt marsh.

The Nyack Tract or Nyack Patent (also spelled Nayack or Najack) was a Lenapehoking settlement to the east of The Narrows in the vicinity of modern Fort Hamilton in Brooklyn, New York City.

Its Canarsee leader was Mattano, who may have been involved with the 1626 "purchase" of Manhattan by Peter Minuit. Later, Mattano and his people were coerced to part with their land by Cornelis van Werkhoven and Jacques Cortelyou in 1652 after Kieft's War, and it became part of New Utrecht.

A remnant of the Lenape population persisted until the late 17th century under English rule, maintaining a longhouse and paying rent to Cortelyou to occupy a fraction of their former land. "Nyack Point" remained a neighborhood name until the early 19th century and the American coastal fortification.

== Context ==
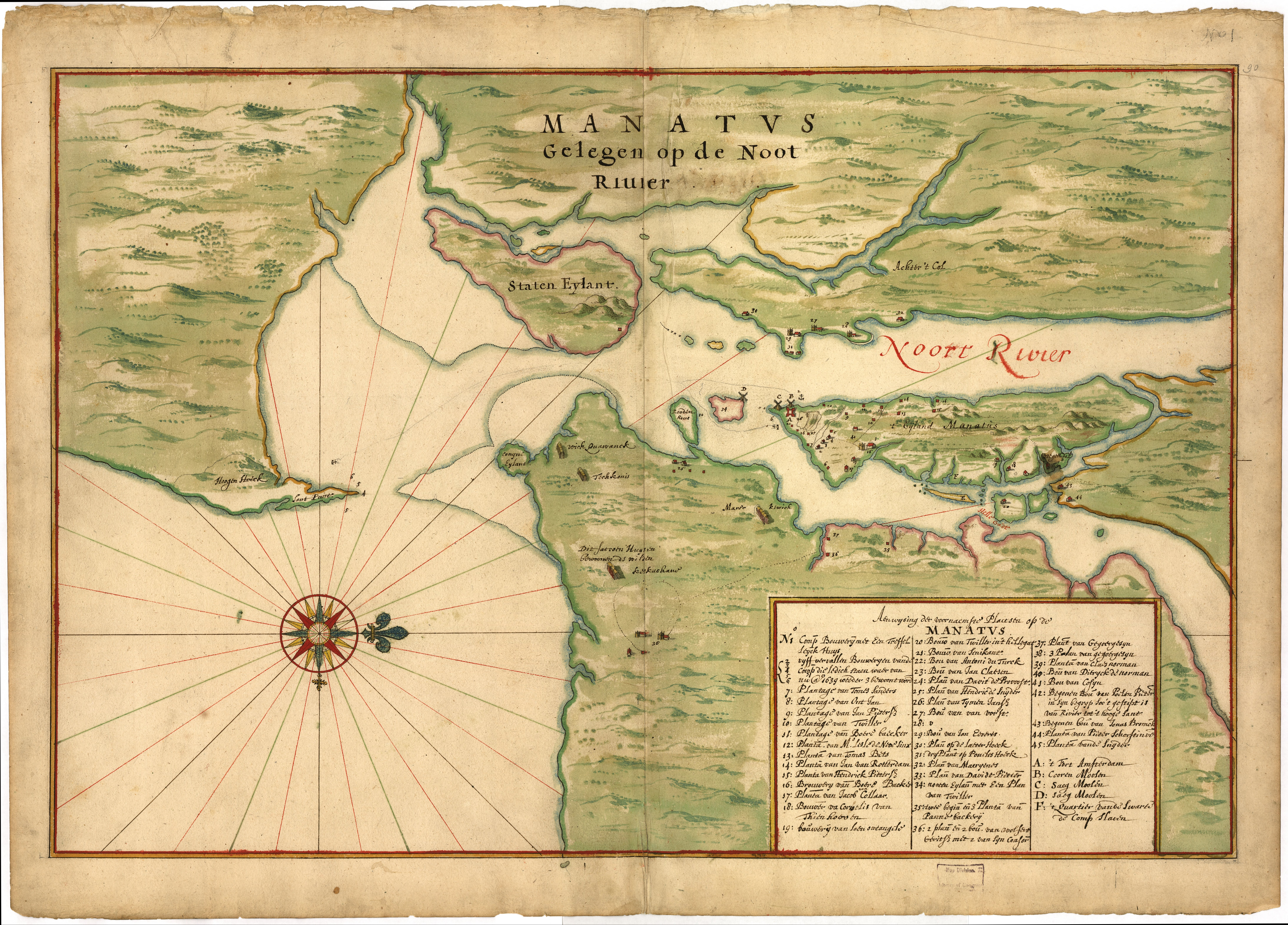
Manatus Map of 1639, with "Wichquawanck" represented by a longhouse.

The Lenape people and their ancestors lived in the New York City area and wider Lenapehoking for thousands of years. Those residing on western Long Island were generally known as Canarsee. Their principal settlement on Lower New York Bay is recorded as "Wichquawanck" on the Manatus Map of 1639, which may be an earlier name or predecessor of the "Nyack" settlement.

Nyack, itself meaning "point" in the Munsee language, was the source of the colonial placename of the "Nyack Point" headland. It is thought to share the same etymology as Nyack, New York in the Hudson Valley. "Nyack Bay", currently known as Gravesend Bay, designated that section of the bay between Nyack Point and Coney Island, and is recorded by that name in accounts of the later English conquest of New Netherland.

The resident sachem Mattano and others at Nyack are described in colonial documents as being "Manhattans", and with its strategic location on The Narrows it is likely their Lenape canoes engaged in commerce with Lower Manhattan. It has been speculated that they were the local group involved with the 1626 "purchase" of Manhattan by Peter Minuit, though the Nyack people would not have practiced Western land ownership, would have been unaware of the content of the Dutch deed, and even their traditional uses would have been of only a fraction of Manhattan.

An 1886 Elbridge S. Brooks children's historical novel includes a fictional Lenape from Nyack, described as trading goods at the Verlettenberg market by modern Exchange Place in Lower Manhattan.

== Displacement ==
About 25 years after the Manhattan "purchase", Mattano and his people were coerced to part with their land by Cornelis van Werkhoven and Jacques Cortelyou in 1652 after Kieft's War, and it became part of New Utrecht.

Many of them relocated to Staten Island, and eventually to New Jersey. Mattano's name was later attached to a similar treaty regarding the Elizabethtown Tract in New Jersey.

A remnant of the Lenape population persisted until the late 17th century under English rule, maintaining a longhouse and paying rent to Cortelyou to occupy a fraction of their former land. They lived in one of the least desirable parts of the tract, on an "island" in the midst of a salt marsh. "Nyack Point" remained a neighborhood name until the early 19th century and the American coastal fortification. The Village of Fort Hamilton was subsequently founded by immigrant workers who did business with the army base, being originally known as "Irishtown".

== Longhouse account ==
Labadist missionary Jasper Danckaerts recorded a visit to a Nyack longhouse in 1679, giving a detailed, almost ethnographic account of life there:

Continuing onward from there, we came to the plantation of the Najack Indians, which was planted with maize, or Turkish wheat. We soon heard a noise of pounding, like thrashing, and went to the place whence it proceeded, and found there an old Indian woman busily employed beating Turkish beans out of the pods by means of a stick, which she did with astonishing force and dexterity. Gerrit inquired of her, in the Indian language, which he spoke perfectly well, how old she was, and she answered eighty years; at which we were still more astonished that so old a woman should still have so much strength and courage to work as she did. We went from thence to her habitation, where we found the whole troop together, consisting of seven or eight families, and twenty or twenty-two persons, I should think. Their house was low and long, about sixty feet long and fourteen or fifteen feet wide. The bottom was earth, the sides and roof were made of reed and the bark of chestnut trees; the posts, or columns, were limbs of trees stuck in the ground, and all fastened together. The top, or ridge of the roof was open about half a foot wide, from one end to the other, in order to let the smoke escape, in place of a chimney. On the sides, or walls, of the house, the roof was so low that you could hardly stand under it. The entrances, or doors, which were at both ends, were so small and low that they had to stoop down and squeeze themselves to get through them. The doors were made of reed or flat bark. In the whole building there was no lime, stone, iron or lead. They build their fire in the middle of the floor, according to the number of families which live in it, so that from one end to the other each of them boils its own pot, and eats when it likes, not only the families by themselves, but each Indian alone, according as he is hungry, at all hours, morning, noon and night. By each fire are the cooking utensils, consisting of a pot, a bowl, or calabash, and a spoon also made of a calabash. These are all that relate to cooking. They lie upon mats with their feet towards the fire, on each side of it. They do not sit much upon any thing raised up, but, for the most part, sit on the ground or squat on their ankles. Their other household articles consists of a calabash of water, out of which they drink, a small basket in which to carry and keep their maize and small beans, and a knife. The implements are, for tillage, a small, sharp stone, and nothing more; for hunting, a gun and pouch for powder and lead; for fishing, a canoe without mast or sail, and without a nail in any part of it, though it is sometimes full forty feet in length, fish hooks and lines, and scoops to paddle with in place of oars. I do not know whether there are not some others of a trifling nature. All who live in one house are generally of one stock or descent, as father and mother with their offspring. Their bread is maize, pounded in a block by a stone, but not fine. This is mixed with water, and made into a cake, which they bake under the hot ashes..

— Jasper Danckaerts, "Journal of Jasper Danckaerts" (1679)
