= Jacques Cortelyou =

Dutch cartographer (c. 1625–1693)

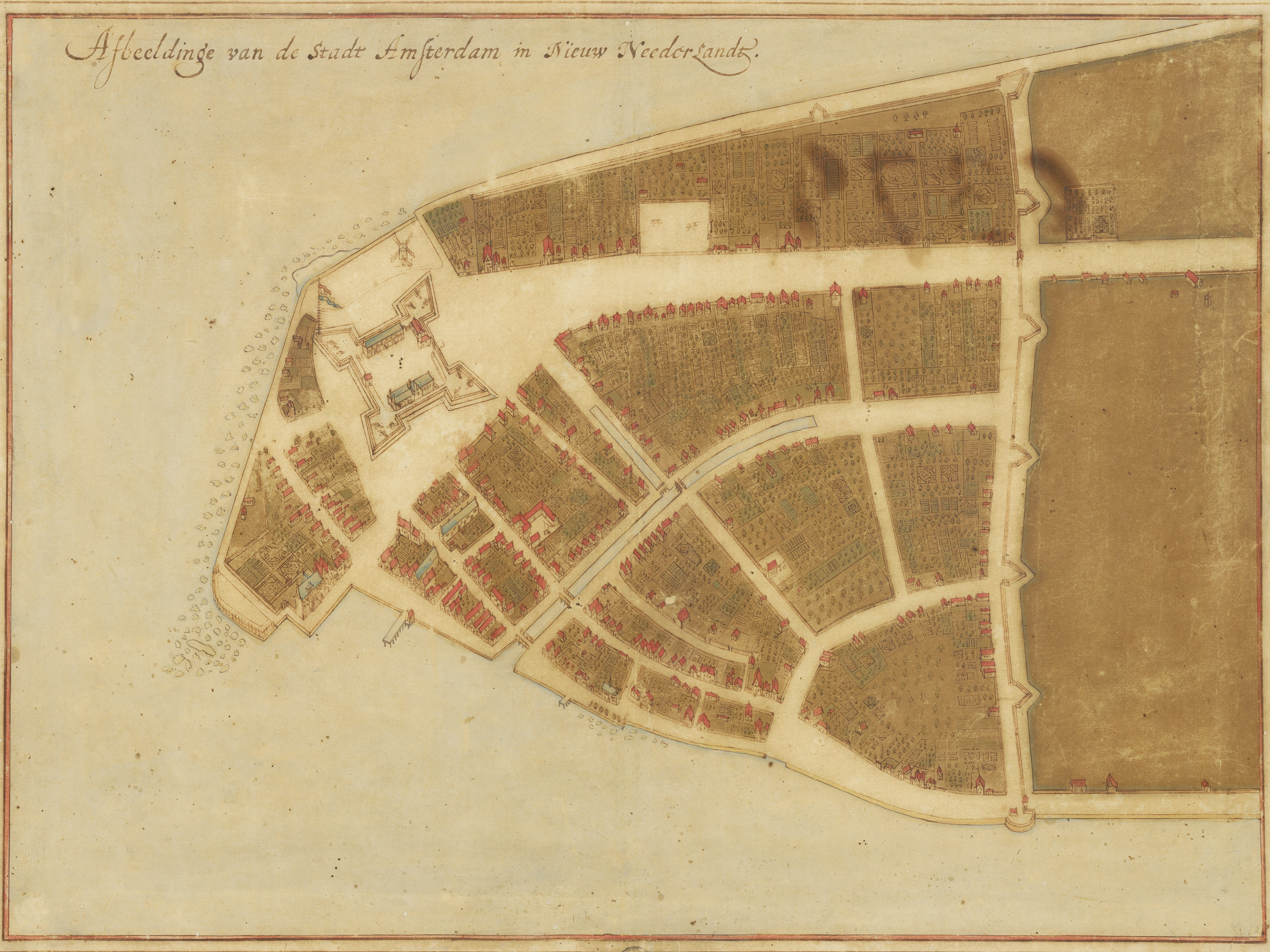
Cortelyou's map of New Amsterdam (the Castello Plan).

Jacques Cortelyou (c. 1625–1693) was an influential early citizen of New Amsterdam (later New York City) who was Surveyor General of the early Dutch colony. Cortelyou's main accomplishment was the so-called Cortelyou Survey, the first map of New York City, commonly called the Castello Plan after the location in a Tuscan palace where it was rediscovered centuries later.

== Early life ==
Cortelyou arrived in Nieuw Amsterdam from Utrecht, Holland, where he had been born to French Huguenot parents. Cortelyou had studied mathematics and land-surveying and served first in Nieuw Amsterdam as tutor to the children of Cornelis van Werkhoven, to whom the Dutch West India Company had granted a tract of land called New Utrecht. Cortelyou was subsequently appointed Surveyor-General of the province of Nieuw Netherlands, succeeding Andries Hudde, and in 1660 made his famous map of Nieuw Amsterdam. Cortelyou also founded two subsequent settlements himself, New Utrecht on Long Island. In 1660 he designed Bergen Square site of the first town within the present borders of the state of New Jersey to receive a municipal charter.

== Cortelyou's career as surveyor and real estate speculator ==
The town of Bergen was located on the bluff "on the west side of the North River in Pavonia," the present location of Bayonne, Jersey City, Hoboken and Weehawken. Cortelyou and his associates had a financial interest in the outcome of the new settlement: they had purchased some "12,000 morgens at Aquackanonk on the Passaic, purchased by himself and associates of the Indians." There is some debate about the origin of the Bergen name, which happens to be the name of one of the earliest settlers of New Amsterdam. (The Bergen and Cortelyou families subsequently intermarried several times, indicating some degree of familiarity.) In any case, the year 1660 was the first time the word "Bergen" was used to describe the new settlement. The original map of the Bergen settlement by Cortelyou, as well as the list of patentees, have been lost to history.

Cortelyou was active in Nieuw Amsterdam and later in New York. He was a real estate speculator, and served in many public offices. As the Surveyor General of the city, Cortelyou worked under Governor Peter Stuyvesant. His most well-known accomplishment was his map of early lower Manhattan, executed in 1660, and known as the Castello Plan. Cortelyou was also instrumental in helping to erect the wall, originally fortified against attacks by Native Americans, from which Wall Street derives its name.

The Labadist missionary Jasper Danckaerts recorded a visit to his Long Island home in 1679 on the Nyack Tract:

Jacques is a man advanced in years. He was born in Utrecht, but of French parents, as we could readily discover from all his actions, looks and language. He had studied philosophy in his youth, and spoke Latin and good French. He was a mathematician and sworn land-surveyor. He has also formerly learned several sciences and had some knowledge of medicine. The worst of it was, he was a good Cartesian and not a good Christian, regulating himself, and all externals, by reason and justice only; nevertheless, he regulated all things better by these principles than most people in these parts do, who bear the name of Christians. . . . Jaques impressed us very much with his sincerity and cordiality in everything we had to do with him. . . . We left with him the little book which we had lent to him, and which he said he had found much pleasure in reading, Les Pensees de M. Pascal.

— Jasper Danckaerts, "Journal of Jasper Danckaerts" (1679)

== Cortelyou's Castello Plan ==
Cortelyou's early plan of New York City was known as the Castello Plan because it was later rediscovered at the Villa di Castello near Florence, Italy, in 1900. The map had been bound within an atlas that was sold to a member of the Medici family.

== See also ==
- The architect Philip Johnson counted Jacques Cortelyou among his ancestors Philip Johnson: Life and Work, Franz Shulze, University of Chicago Press, 1996
- Cortelyou Road in Brooklyn is named for this early surveyor The New York Times, June 5, 2005
  - Cortelyou Road (BMT Brighton Line), thus derives its name from Jacques Cortelyou
- Lawrence Van Voorhees Cortelyou, a descendant of Jacques the surveyor, was a member of the Holland Society. "Names of Early Comers," The New York Times, January 13, 1895
- Cortelyou Library
