= Disappearance of Adam Herrman =

1999 disappearance in Kansas, U.S.

- Herrman in an undated photograph
- Born: Irvin Groeninger III; June 8, 1987
- Disappeared: May 1999; Towanda, Kansas, US
- Status: Missing

In May 1999, 11-year-old Adam Joseph Herrman disappeared from the Pine Ridge Mobile Home Park, located in Towanda, Kansas. The disappearance, which remains unsolved, was not reported until 2008. Butler County authorities have searched numerous properties and conducted at least one dig in relation to the case.

== Early life ==
Herrman was born on June 8, 1987, under the name Irvin Groeninger III. He entered a foster program and came under the care of Doug and Valerie Herrman, although in 1990 or 1991 they lost the foster license that allowed them to care for him. In November 1996, his home along North Westview Drive in Derby, Kansas, was investigated after a report of suspected abuse at the residence. The Kansas Department for Children and Families (then the Department of Social and Rehabilitation Services) found that the report could not be substantiated. In January 1998, Herrman's school filed an abuse report, although investigations into the report found that no crime had taken place at the residence. Later that month Herrman reportedly ran away from his home, but returned shortly after the report was filed. He was withdrawn from public school the following month, moving to the Pine Ridge Mobile Home Park in Towanda where his parents homeschooled him.

== Disappearance and search efforts ==
Hermann was last seen in May 1999 while at the mobile home park, although for unclear reasons he was not reported as a missing person until 2008, around 10 years after he was last seen. Search efforts began in early 2009, when the Sedgwick County Exploited and Missing Children's Unit searched the area where the Herrman's mobile home had previously been located, after receiving a tip by a relative related to the case. Craig Murphy, Butler County Sheriff at the time, noted that no remains had been found; another residence was searched in Sedgwick County shortly after. The Whitewater River was additionally searched for any clues related to his whereabouts.

Butler County Sheriff until 2020, Kelly Herzet, expressed doubts during a news conference that Herrman was alive; He offered a $50,000 reward for information leading to an arrest and conviction in relation to the case. In February 2020, social media posts appeared online from a person claiming to be Herrman. Herzet noted that "knowing as much about the case as I know about the case, I knew for sure it was not Adam Herrman"; the social media posts and identity claims were determined to be a hoax.

In April 2026, a hole was dug using an excavator between a street and privacy fence line in the neighborhood that Herrman disappeared from after receiving a tip, although nothing was found.

== See also ==
- Disappearance of Randy Leach, a similar disappearance in 1988 in Kansas
