= Argye M. Briggs =

American writer

- Born: Argye Mary McCanlies; September 20, 1908; Cisco, Texas
- Died: April 17, 1995 (aged 86); Waco, Texas
- Occupation: Author

Argye Mary Briggs (born 1908 — died 1995) was an American author who wrote about the lives of ordinary people in the prairies of the American Midwest. After living most of her life in Bartlesville, Oklahoma, she died on April 17, 1995, in Waco, Texas, at the age of 86.

== Works ==
- Root Out of Dry Ground (1948) Winner of the Eerdmans Fiction Award.
- This, My Brother (1950)
- Hem of His Garment (1951)
- Harp in the Cave (1954) A book of children's stories.
- Both Banks of the River (1954) A fictionalized biography of Chief Journeycake of the Delawares.
- All Other Ground (1956)
- A Question Once Asked (1956) A History of Woman's Missionary Union, Auxiliary to the Baptist General Convention of Oklahoma.
- Christ and the Modern Woman (1958)
