= Holly Wilson =

Native American artist from Oklahoma

- Born: 1968 (age 57–58)
- Citizenship: Delaware Nation and American
- Education: Kansas City Art Institute (BFA), Cameron University; Stephen F. Austin State University (MA, MFA)
- Occupation: Artist
- Known for: sculpture
- Awards: Eiteljorg Fellowship; 2015
- Website: hollywilson.com

Holly Wilson (born 1968) is a Native American artist from Oklahoma. She is an enrolled member of the Delaware Nation and is of Delaware Tribe of Indians descent.

Wilson lives and works in Mustang, Oklahoma. According to Wilson, she used to call herself a sculptor, a clay artist, photographer, among many others before setting for the term "artist." As a contemporary multimedia artist, her works range from using paint (oil), bronze, clay, wood, encaustic painting, photography, and more. Her artworks are exhibited nationally and internationally in private, public, and museum collections.

Her works draw inspiration from Native American stories that she heard as a child and include themes such as shape shifters, tricksters, messenger birds, and owl bearers. Her sculptures often feature stick-like figures and animals with anthropomorphic qualities.

Her professional website states: "Holly Wilson creates figures that serve as her storytellers to the world, conveying stories of the sacred and the precious, capturing moments of our day, vulnerabilities, and strengths. The stories are, at one time, both representations of family history as well as personal experiences. Wilson's work reaches a broad audience allowing the viewer the opportunity to see their personal connection. Wilson works in various media, including bronzes, paint, encaustic, photography, glass, and clay.

== Education ==
In 1992, Holly Wilson earned her Bachelor of Fine Arts in ceramics from the Kansas City Art Institute. In 1993, she earned her teaching certification in primary and secondary education (K-12) from Cameron University in Lawton, Oklahoma. She earned her Master of Arts degree in ceramics in 1994 and MFA degree in sculpture in 2001 from Stephen F. Austin State University in Texas.

== Artworks ==
=== Bloodline ===
Bloodline (2015) is in a wall-hanging sculptural installation that is 29 inches high, 9 inches deep, and 264 inches wide. Wilson traced her Native American lineage to share her identity and family history to prove the amount of blood quantum that is required to be an Indian in her tribe. She was inspired by the Native American story of the Stick People. Bloodline includes several sections, each possessing a different generation of her family. The bronzed patina figures form a single line and walk along the cut locust wood. With the wood cut lengthwise, its life history is unveiled for the audience to see, and the author used that to represent the lives of the figures standing above the wood. When it is hung and light is projected upon it, it creates a shadow. That shadow is the artist's intangible memories constituting the figure's life in history. Leading the beginning of the wall sculpture are her five children, including three that didn't survive; the second section consists of her siblings as well as herself; then her parents, and so forth. With the figures walking together as one, it emphasizes the joint effort of her ancestors and their offspring in building a family.

In a 2021 appraisal in National Review, critic Brian T. Allen singled out the work as a favorite of the Weaving History Into Art exhibition at Tulsa's Gilcrease Museum. "I loved Carol Emarthle Douglas's baskets and especially Holly Wilson's Bloodline. It's a 22-foot-long wall sculpture. On top of a long piece of locust wood cut in equal segments and assembled to look like an artery, small bronze figures process in a line. Each segment represents a generation. The tree's cut lengthwise, so viewers see its own history. Bloodlines legally determine eligibility for tribal membership. The figures are anonymous and wraithlike. Most of us know little about our ancestry, but it's ours nonetheless, unique and influential."

=== We Need A Hero ===
We Need A Hero (2015) is a cast-bronze sculptural installation. The sharp tacks lodged on the wall are incoming bombs that represent messages coming from society. The messages come in an array of different shapes and colors signifying that not all will survive or reach very far. The blue messages are harmless, but the white ones lead to destruction for it is highly explosive. The little boy, who she referenced after her son, stands proudly on top of a bronze paper airplane. By placing the boy in the center of the incoming danger, Wilson is indicating that the child is ready to face the world set before him.

=== Under the Skin ===
Her children and the crayon boxes she purchased for them in school inspired her to create the medium of Under the Skin. What ignited the story of creating this sculpture was the conversation between two children. They described their classmates using colors with no ill intent. She combined the leftover crayons her kids had used and with the vivid colors of the crayons, she created rows upon rows of little figurines on the wall. Each figure had its designated color and put together in a way where it created a rainbow. The purpose of Under the Skin is to display that no matter the color of our skin, the shape of our body, or our origin, we are all the same.

== Selected exhibitions ==
=== Solo exhibitions ===
- Dream within a Dream (2019), M. A. Doran Gallery, Tulsa, Oklahoma
- On Turtle's Back (2019), Dunedin Fine Art Center, Dunedin, Florida
- Holly Wilson Solo (2019), Bonner David Galleries, Scottsdale, Arizona
- Below the Surface (2019), Travois, Kansas City, Missouri
- On Turtles Back (2018)
- Talk Story (solo)
- I'm Still Here (2017)

=== Group exhibition ===
- Art for a New Understanding: Native Voices, 1950s to Now
- Hear My Voice: Native American Art of the Past and Present
- Four by Four 2016: Midwest Invitational
- Expressions of Spirit 1994

== Representation ==
The M. A. Doran Gallery includes some of her artworks such as the "Dancing by the Light of the Fireflies She Was Herself" made from oil paints on panel; "Frayed" and "Finding My Way Back" was made by bronze and patina; "Carried in the Wind" with bronze; using encaustic she created "The Promises of Tomorrow She Held Within", and "Brother and Sister" with bronze, patina, and wood.

The Bonner David Gallery holds eight artworks, including "Gathering" made from bronze, patina, and wood; "Paper Wings: Fearless", "Guarded Self", and "We Need a Hero" that were made from using bronze and patina; "Night Garden" created with encaustic (hot wax) on a panel; "It's My Party", with patina and bronze; "The Interwoven Dragon" made from bronze, steel, cedar, and patina; and"Girl in the Red Dress" with cold wax and oil paint on panel.

== Public collections ==
The Eiteljorg Museum of American Indians and Western Art holds her sculptures such as Belonging (2014) made from geodes and bronze, and "Masked" (2012) made from African Mahogany and Bronze.

Other public collections include:

- Nasher Museum of Art at Duke University
- Virginia Museum of Fine Arts
- Wheelwright Museum of the American Indian

== Honors and awards ==
- 2015: Eiteljorg Fellowship, Eiteljorg Museum of American Indians and Western Art, Indianapolis
- 2017: SWAIA Discovery Fellowship, Santa Fe Indian Market
