= Journeycake =

Journeycake may refer to:

- Johnnycake, a cornmeal flatbread also known as Journeycake
- Johnnycake Town, a village in Maryland also known as Journeycake Town
- Charles Journeycake
