= Slaughter of the Innocents =

Slaughter of the Innocents may refer to:

- Slaughter of the Innocents (film), a 1993 thriller film
- Massacre of the Innocents, a biblical account of infanticide by Herod the Great
- Pavonia Massacre and Massacre at Corlears Hook, New Netherland killings on February 25, 1643

== See also ==
- Slaughter of the Innocent, a 1978 book by Hans Ruesch
