= Etymology of Manhattan =

Origin of the place-name Manhattan

"Manhattan", first entering the colonial record in 1609, is one of the oldest indigenous place names still extant in the United States. Manhattan bears a particularly prominent toponym as the island on which New York City was founded, and a metonym for the city's power and influence. Its exact etymology is uncertain, but undoubtedly has its roots in the Munsee language of Lenapehoking. Possible meanings include that it is derived from the Lenape term for "island" itself or of some modified phrase, or that pars pro toto it originally referred only to the island's southern point, named after a hickory grove there. It was also sometimes in the past been attributed as an ethnonym of a local Lenape group, but this is almost certainly mistaken.

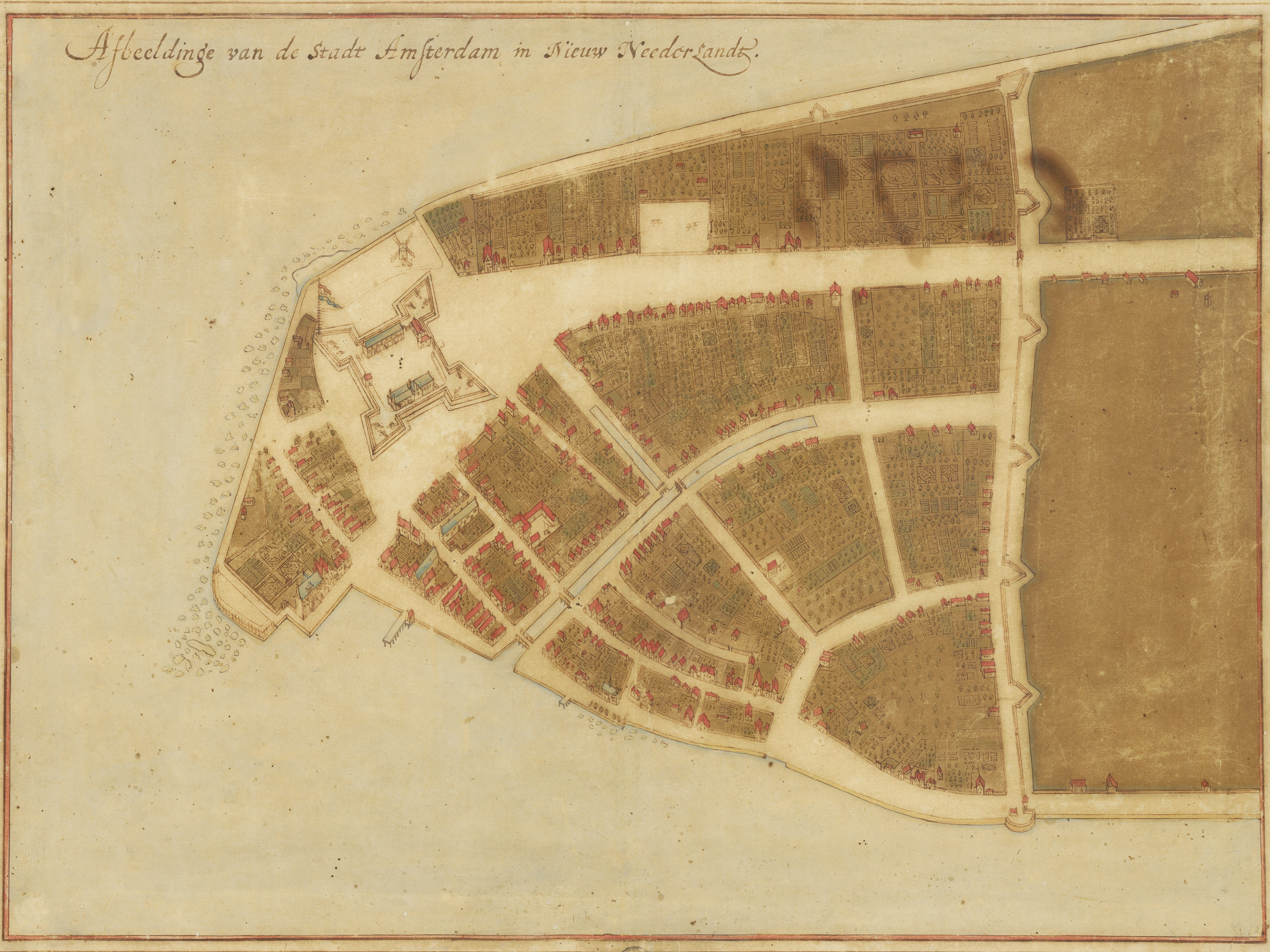
The Manhattoes was the area at the very southern tip of the island which grew into New Amsterdam, and subsequently the New York City borough of Manhattan, at the birthplace of New York City (c. 1624).

Manhattoe/Manhattoes is a term describing a place and, mistakenly, a people. The location was the very southern tip of the Manhattan island during the time of the Dutch colonization of the Americas at what became New Amsterdam there. The people were a band of the Wappinger known as the Weckquaesgeek, native to an area further north in what is now Westchester County, who controlled the upper three-quarters of the island as a hunting ground.

As was common practice early in the days of European settlement of North America, a people came to be associated with a place, with its name displacing theirs among the settlers and those associated with them, such as explorers, mapmakers, trading company superiors who sponsored many of the early settlements, and officials in the settlers' mother country in Europe.

Because of this early conflation there is enduring confusion over whether "Manhattoe/Manhattoes" were a people or a place. There is certainty it was a place, at the very tip of Manhattan Island, so referred to by the Dutch, who evidently inherited the Native American name for the spot they chose to place their settlement (rather than named it after a people already living there, as the island was not permanently inhabited at the time of their 1609 arrival nor Peter Minuit's subsequent purchase of it from the Canarse Indians for 60 guilders in 1626).

Period accounts maintain that Manhattan island was used as a hunting ground by two tribes, the Canarse (Canarsee, or Canarsie) of today's Brooklyn at its southern one-quarter and the Weckquaesgeek the rest, each having no more than temporary camps for hunting parties.

== Morphology ==
From Manna-hata, as written in the 1609 logbook of Robert Juet, an officer on Henry Hudson's ship Halve Maen (Half Moon), published in the English travelogue collection of Samuel Purchas. The Velasco Map, dated 1610, depicts the name doubleted, Manahata on the west side, and Manahatin on the east side of the Mauritius River (later named the Hudson River), though its authenticity has been questioned. This plurality appears in many colonial Dutch writings, which often refer to "the Manhattans" or similar.

Scholarship generally supports one of two possible meanings for Manna-hata — either a variation on the Lenape term for "island" (similar to Manhasset, New York on Long Island), or to the Lenape term designating the southernmost point of the island, said to have been the site of hickory trees.

The word "Manhattan" has been translated as island of many hills. The Encyclopedia of New York City offers other derivations, including from the Munsee dialect of Lenape: manahachtanienk ("place of general inebriation"), manahatouh ("place where timber is procured for bows and arrows"), or menatay ("island").

The name Manhattan most likely originated, via loaning by Dutch, from the Lenape's local language Munsee, manaháhtaan (where manah- means "gather", -aht- means "bow", and -aan is an abstract element used to form verb stems). The Lenape word has been translated as "the place where we get bows" or "place for gathering the (wood to make) bows". According to a Munsee tradition recorded by Albert Seqaqkind Anthony in the 19th century, the island was named so for a grove of hickory trees at its southern end that was considered ideal for the making of bows. An alternate theory claims a "Delaware source akin to Munsee munahan ("island")." Nora Thompson Dean (Touching Leaves Woman) defined it as: 'place that is an island', from Lenape Menating. The common poetic rendering in American verse is "Mannahatta", originating perhaps in Washington Irving's Knickerbocker's History (with one "t") and popularized by Walt Whitman (with two "t"s).

== Toponym/ethnonym ==
=== Manhattoes/Manhattans (place) ===
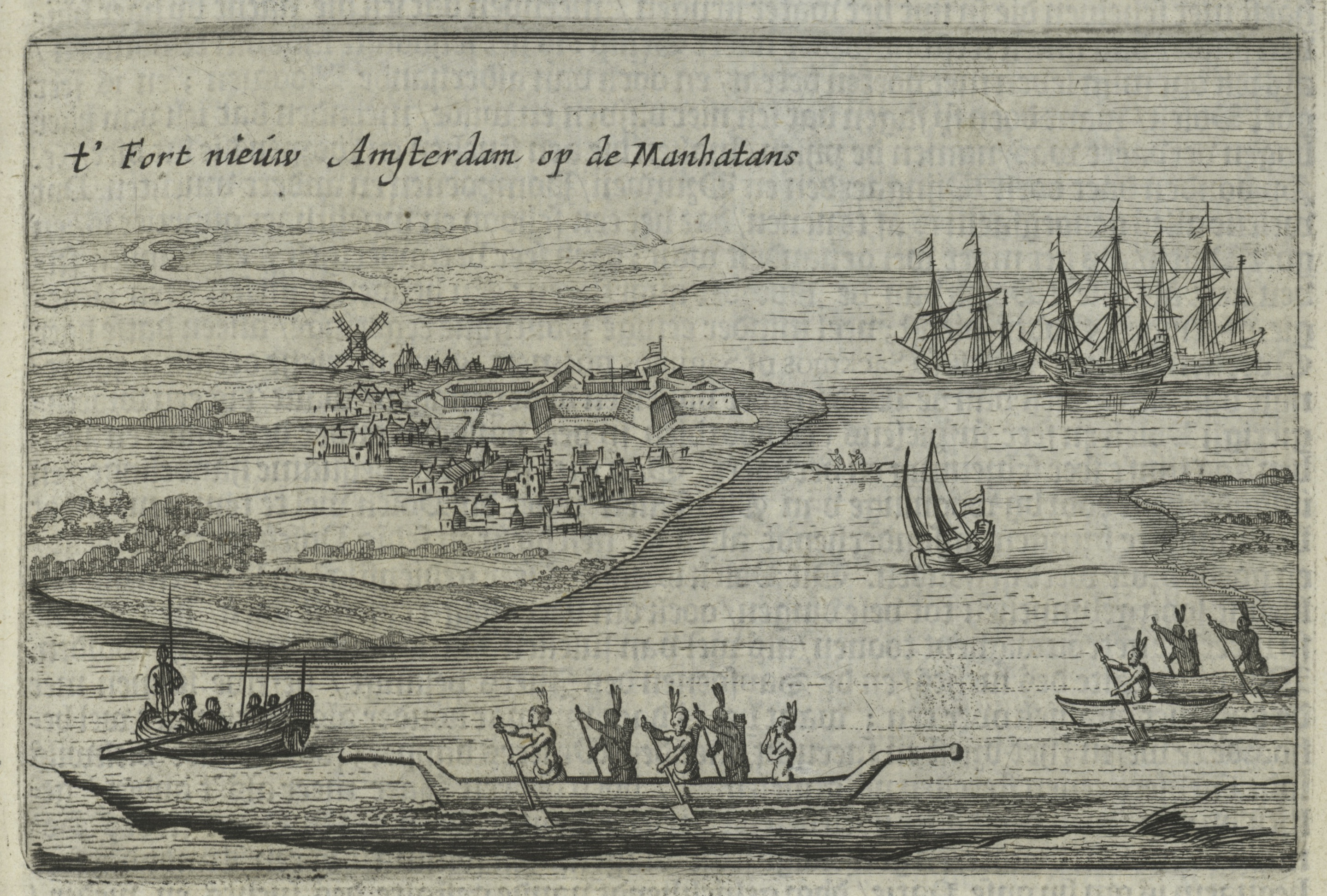
The "earliest depiction of Manhattan" (c.1626) shows Fort Amsterdam on what it calls the "Manhatans" on the very southern tip of today's Manhattan island

Manhattoes was the name of a Dutch settlement in New Netherlands in the early decades of their settlement there in the 1600s. Located at the very southern tip of today's Manhattan Island, it was known by the native term by both the Dutch and the English who wished to displace them. Fort Nieuw Amsterdam was built in 1627, but the common name held fast. Eventually, by the time of the incorporation of the settlement, the fort's name displaced the original, and "Manhattoes" became Nieuw Amsterdam in 1653.

The original southernmost tip of Manhattan corresponds approximately to the modern Peter Minuit Plaza.

The terms Manhattans and Manhatans were also used for the Manhattoes by some Dutch, giving rise to Manhattan island's contemporary name and conflation with a people (the Wecquaeskgeek) who neither occupied that part of the island nor went by that name.

=== Manhattoe/Manhattan (people) ===
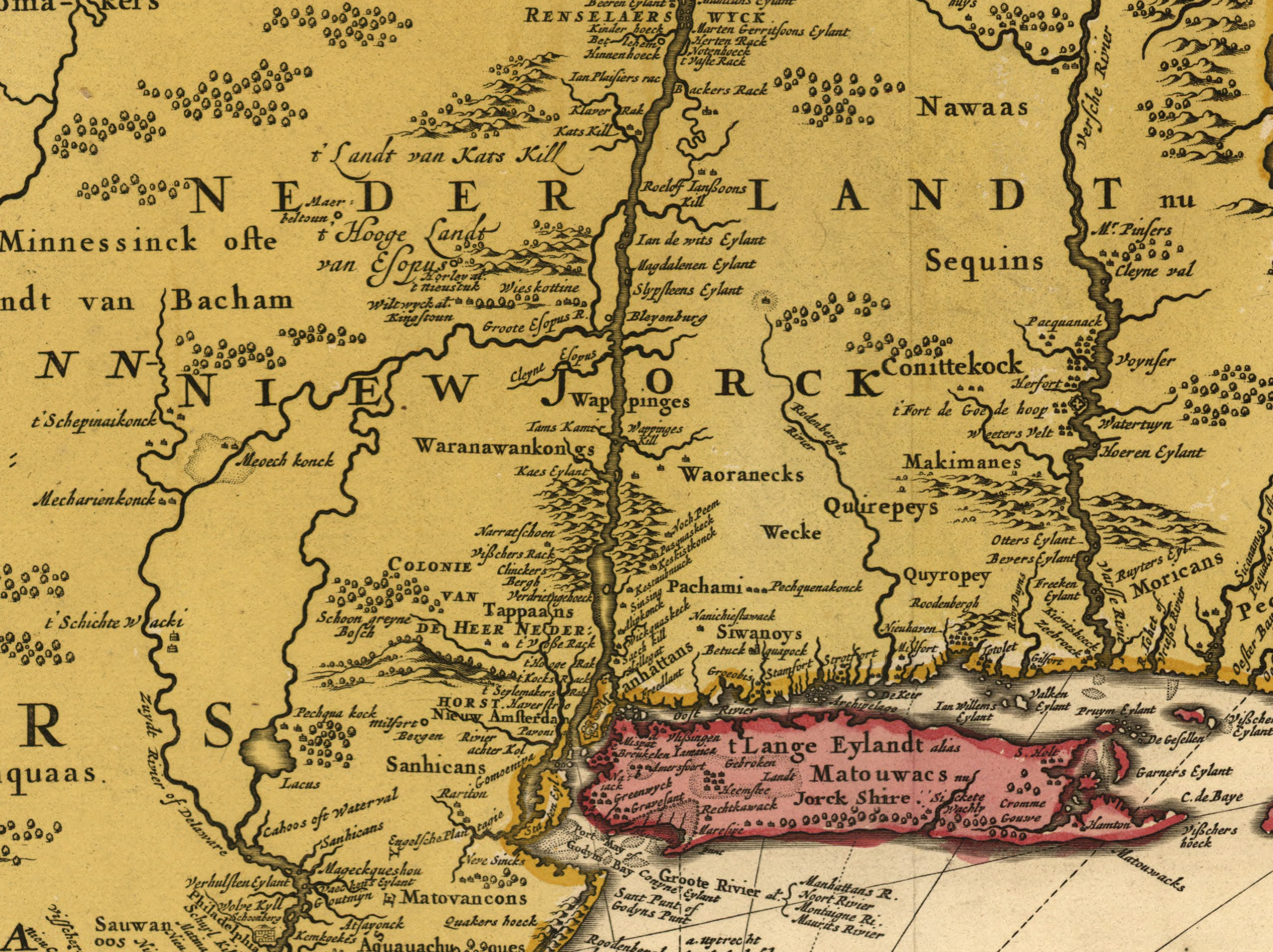
This 1685 revision of a 1656 map erroneously indicates "Wickquaskeck" in Westchester County above Manhattan island and "Manhattans" on it

Manhattoe, also Manhattan, was a name erroneously given to a Native American people of the lower Hudson River, the Weckquaesgeek, (Note: Writer Nathaniel Benchley argues that the Dutch simply found it easier to refer to the natives as "Manhattans" rather than Weckquaesgeek.) a Wappinger band which occupied the southwestern part of today's Westchester County. (Note: They were, along with the Tappans, Raritan, and other Wappinger bands along the Hudson, known as the "River Indians".) In the early days of Dutch settlement they utilized the upper three-quarters of Manhattan Island as a hunting grounds.

The people – Wecquaesgeek – became conflated with a place - the Manhattoes, regardless that it was the only part of the island they did not occupy. Over time that term became "Manhattan" and "Manhattans" for those who hunted the vast majority of the island, as well as the name of the island.

Contrastingly, the name "Manhattans" was also applied in a 1652 colonial document to the people of the Nyack Tract in Brooklyn, and their leader is named as "Mattano". Nyack people were Canarsee, and may have been connected to southern Manhattan Island.

== See also ==
- Indigenous peoples of Long Island
