= Linwood, Kansas =

- City
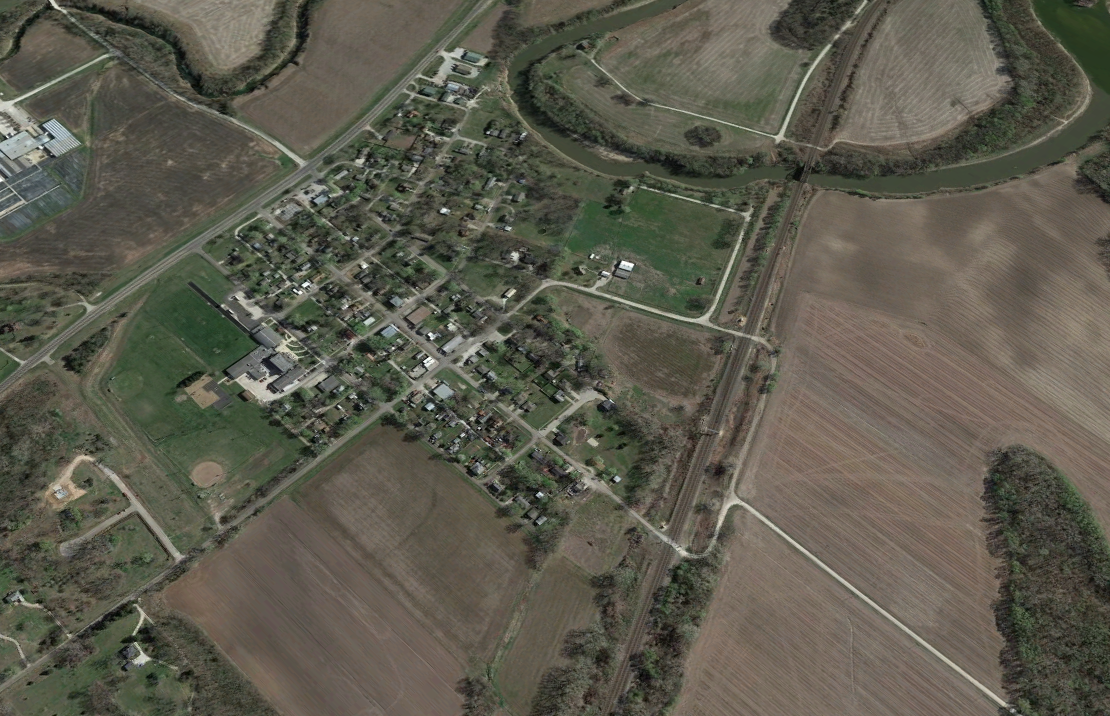
- Aerial view of Linwood (2017)

- Location within Leavenworth County and Kansas

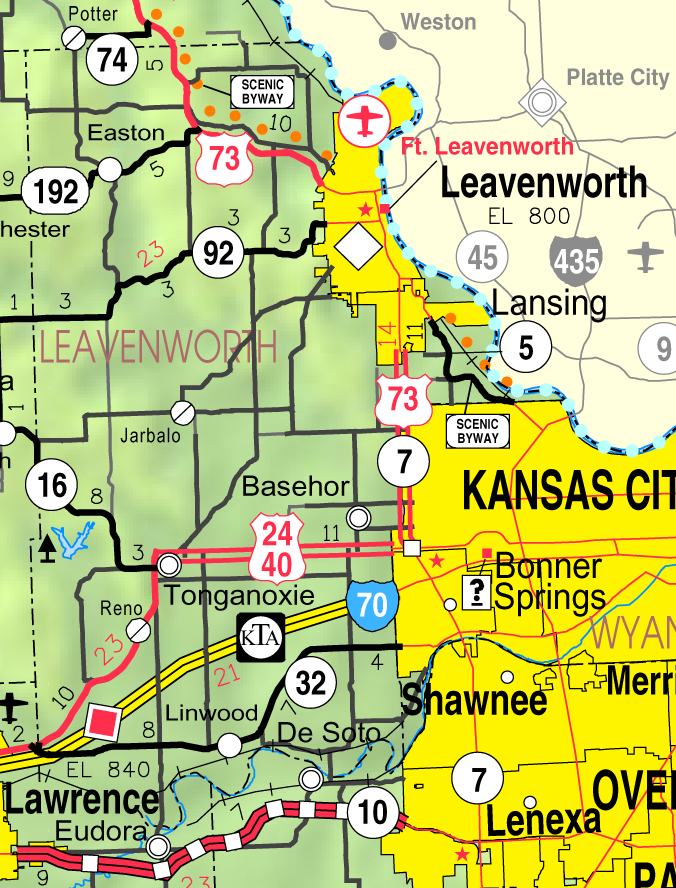
- KDOT map of Leavenworth County (legend)
- Coordinates: 39°00′07″N 95°02′11″W
- Country: United States
- State: Kansas
- County: Leavenworth
- Founded: 1860s
- Platted: 1867
- Incorporated: 1895
- Named for: Linden tree

Government
  - Type: Mayor–Council

Area
  - Total: 0.60 sq mi (1.56 km^{2})
  - Land: 0.58 sq mi (1.51 km^{2})
  - Water: 0.019 sq mi (0.05 km^{2})
- Elevation: 804 ft (245 m)

Population (2020)
  - Total: 415
  - Density: 712/sq mi (275/km^{2})
- Time zone: UTC-6 (CST)
  - Summer (DST): UTC-5 (CDT)
- ZIP Code: 66052
- Area code: 913
- GNIS ID: 2395727
- Website: cityoflinwood.org

Linwood is a city in Leavenworth County, Kansas, United States, and part of the Kansas City metropolitan area. As of the 2020 census, the population of the city was 415. It is located along K-32 highway between Lawrence and Bonner Springs.

== History ==
=== Beginnings ===
Linwood was founded as Journeycake, named after Charles Journeycake, the last Delaware chief. People occasionally made fun of the name Journeycake by calling it "Johnny Cake." The community was platted on both sides of Stranger Creek, near the creek's mouth at the Kansas River.

In May 1860, a treaty was signed at Sarcoxieville, 3 miles (4.8 km) northeast of Linwood, by Chief Sarcoxie of the Delaware and by the United States. After the treaty's signature, each member of the tribe was assigned a parcel of land, and the balance of the tribe's territories were sold to the predecessor of the Union Pacific Railroad. Meanwhile, the U.S. government established a trading post near Stranger Creek until the tribe was moved to the Indian Territory in 1867. Located beside the Union Pacific Railroad tracks, the trading post became the first school in the community.

=== Union Pacific Railroad ===
In September 1863, the Union Pacific Railroad began building the main line westward across the Great Plains from Kansas City, Kansas, to Denver, Colorado. This was the long-line railroad in Kansas for 2–3 years. The first 40 miles (64 km) were opened in 1864 from Wyandotte (now a suburb of Kansas City) to Lawrence. William A. Harris moved to Kansas in 1865 employed as a civil engineer for the Union Pacific Railroad. In 1868 it became the Kansas Pacific Railroad.

=== Name change ===
The original community of Journeycake was officially platted as Stranger on July 11, 1867, and recorded at the Leavenworth County Courthouse. When the name Stranger became a problem for the Postal Service. who confused Stranger with a nearby community also named Stranger (referred to as "Big" Stranger), it was renamed Linwood on December 20, 1877. Legend has it that one day when the citizens were cutting wood for the church, Colonel Loring suggested they change the name to Linwood, because of the many linden trees that grew in the area. But, according to the Kansas Historical Collections, the community of Stranger had its name changed to Linwood by Senator William A. Harris because of his great appreciation for the Linden trees that were abundant in the vicinity of Stranger Creek.

=== Senator Harris ===
William A. Harris moved to Kansas in 1865 and worked as a civil engineer for the Union Pacific Railroad until 1868, when he moved to Lawrence, Kansas. He was appointed agent for the railroad companies in the sale of the Delaware Reservation and other lands. In 1884, Harris became a prominent citizen of Linwood, where he engaged in agricultural pursuits and stock raising. He bought about 100 acres (400,000 m^{2}) of land just west of Linwood. On a high hill within sight of the city he built a modest two-story mansion with fifteen rooms, the Harris House. Harris was elected as a Democratic Congressman to the Fifty-third Congress (1893–1895) and as a Populist to the U.S. Senate (1897–1903). He was an unsuccessful candidate for Governor of Kansas in 1906. Harris died in 1909, and is buried in Lawrence, Kansas.

=== Relocation ===
Much of Linwood's commerce came from the sawmills on the river, as the city had grown very near the banks of the Kansas River (known as the "Kaw" River) that flows eastward to the Missouri. After the 1903 flood damaged and endangered much of Linwood, the city was relocated about one mile (1.6 km) north to its present location out of "the bottoms" (as they are still known today) near the river.

=== 21st century ===
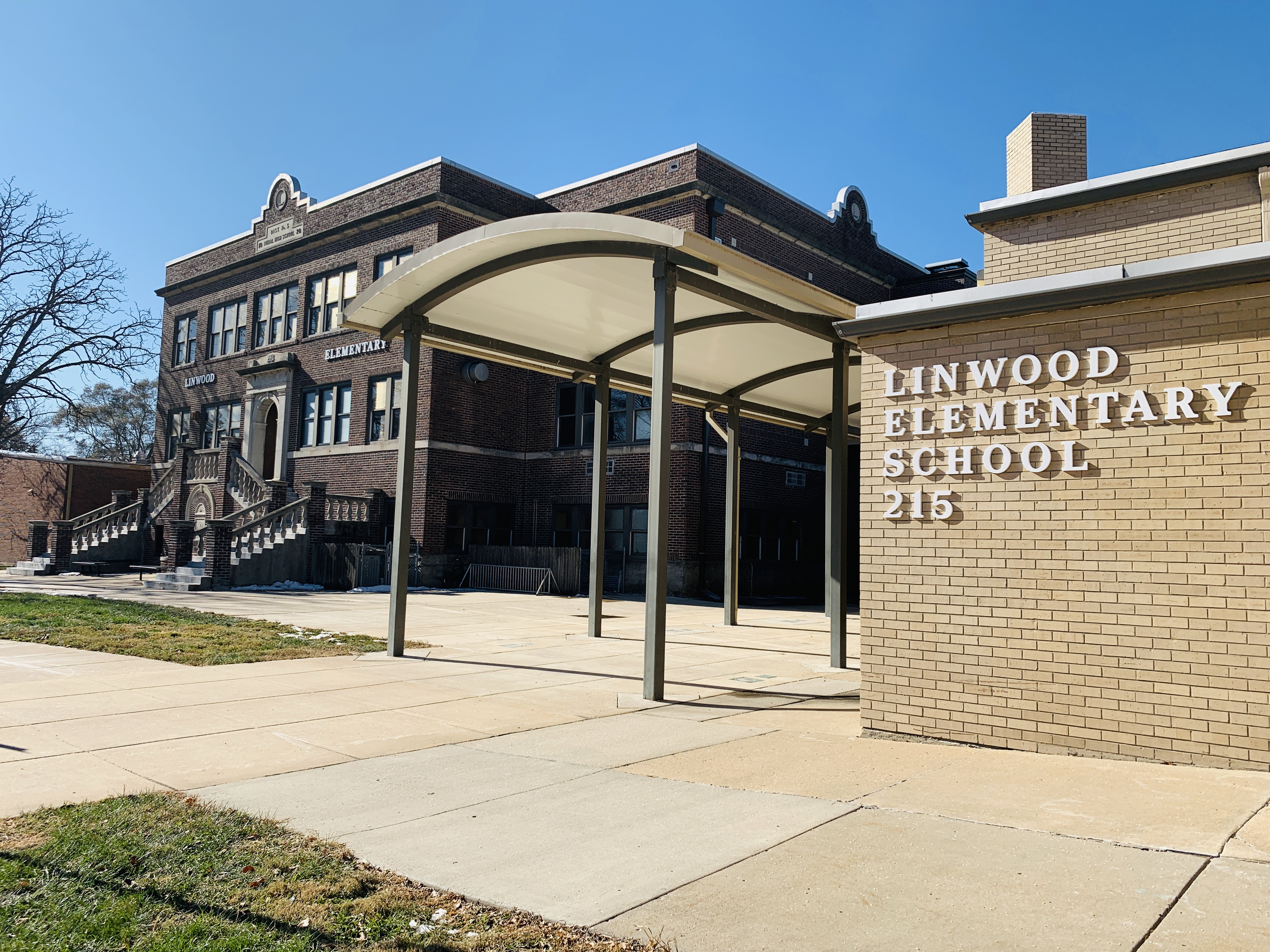
Linwood Elementary School

Present-day Linwood is a small city that is accessed mainly from K-32, as the Golden Road bridge over Stranger Creek collapsed in the early 2000s and has never been rebuilt. Currently, the city has less than 400 people. Since 2019, numerous new homes have been built drawing new families. Linwood has several businesses including a gas station, tavern, landscaping company, salsa plant and a Dollar General retail store.

=== 2019 tornado ===
On May 28, 2019, an EF4 tornado struck the outlying areas of the city and severely damaged homes. At least 13 injuries were reported due to the storm. The city itself was spared any major damage, with just the occasional roof damage and loss of trees and fencing.

== Geography ==
According to the United States Census Bureau, the city has a total area of 0.73 square miles (1.89 km^{2}), of which 0.71 square miles (1.84 km^{2}) are land and 0.02 square miles (0.05 km^{2}) are water. Linwood is situated along the north bank of the Kansas River.

== Demographics ==
Historical population
Census	Pop.	Note	%±
1880	125		—
1890	306		144.8%
1900	349		14.1%
1910	323		−7.4%
1920	364		12.7%
1930	295		−19.0%
1940	299		1.4%
1950	261		−12.7%
1960	375		43.7%
1970	323		−13.9%
1980	343		6.2%
1990	409		19.2%
2000	374		−8.6%
2010	375		0.3%
2020	415		10.7%
U.S. Decennial Census

=== Racial and ethnic composition ===
Linwood city, Kansas – Racial and ethnic composition Note: the US Census treats Hispanic/Latino as an ethnic category. This table excludes Latinos from the racial categories and assigns them to a separate category. Hispanics/Latinos may be of any race.
Race / Ethnicity (NH = Non-Hispanic)	Pop 2000	Pop 2010	Pop 2020	% 2000	% 2010	% 2020
White alone (NH)	326	338	366	87.17%	90.13%	88.19%
Black or African American alone (NH)	2	0	0	0.53%	0.00%	0.00%
Native American or Alaska Native alone (NH)	0	0	2	0.00%	0.00%	0.48%
Asian alone (NH)	0	1	1	0.00%	0.27%	0.24%
Native Hawaiian or Pacific Islander alone (NH)	0	0	0	0.00%	0.00%	0.00%
Other race alone (NH)	0	0	1	0.00%	0.00%	0.24%
Mixed race or Multiracial (NH)	17	10	23	4.55%	2.67%	5.54%
Hispanic or Latino (any race)	29	26	22	7.75%	6.93%	5.30%
Total	374	375	415	100.00%	100.00%	100.00%

=== 2020 census ===
The 2020 United States census counted 415 people, 153 households, and 105 families in Linwood. The population density was 711.8 per square mile (274.8/km^{2}). There were 163 housing units at an average density of 279.6 per square mile (107.9/km^{2}). The racial makeup was 90.84% (377) white or European American (88.19% non-Hispanic white), 0.0% (0) black or African-American, 0.48% (2) Native American or Alaska Native, 0.24% (1) Asian, 0.24% (1) Pacific Islander or Native Hawaiian, 0.24% (1) from other races, and 7.95% (33) from two or more races. Hispanic or Latino of any race was 5.3% (22) of the population.

Of the 153 households, 45.8% had children under the age of 18; 51.0% were married couples living together; 17.0% had a female householder with no spouse or partner present. 24.2% of households consisted of individuals and 8.5% had someone living alone who was 65 years of age or older. The average household size was 2.5 and the average family size was 2.9. The percent of those with a bachelor's degree or higher was estimated to be 9.9% of the population.

26.5% of the population was under the age of 18, 10.1% from 18 to 24, 29.2% from 25 to 44, 22.2% from 45 to 64, and 12.0% who were 65 years of age or older. The median age was 35.1 years. For every 100 females, there were 99.5 males. For every 100 females ages 18 and older, there were 84.8 males.

The 2016–2020 5-year American Community Survey estimates show that the median household income was $52,727 (with a margin of error of +/- $12,418) and the median family income was $53,598 (+/- $2,902). Males had a median income of $37,500 (+/- $4,179) versus $38,125 (+/- $18,993) for females. The median income for those above 16 years old was $37,639 (+/- $7,721). Approximately, 9.7% of families and 11.3% of the population were below the poverty line, including 17.8% of those under the age of 18 and 0.0% of those ages 65 or over.

=== 2010 census ===
As of the census of 2010, there were 375 people, 139 households, and 92 families residing in the city. The population density was 528.2 inhabitants per square mile (203.9/km^{2}). There were 149 housing units at an average density of 209.9 per square mile (81.0/km^{2}). The racial makeup of the city was 92.5% White, 0.3% Native American, 0.3% Asian, 4.0% from other races, and 2.9% from two or more races. Hispanic or Latino people of any race were 6.9% of the population.

There were 139 households, of which 37.4% had children under the age of 18 living with them, 42.4% were married couples living together, 10.8% had a female householder with no husband present, 12.9% had a male householder with no wife present, and 33.8% were non-families. 25.9% of all households were made up of individuals, and 8.7% had someone living alone who was 65 years of age or older. The average household size was 2.70 and the average family size was 3.14.

The median age in the city was 31.8 years. 27.2% of residents were under the age of 18; 12.8% were between the ages of 18 and 24; 30.9% were from 25 to 44; 21% were from 45 to 64; and 8% were 65 years of age or older. The gender makeup of the city was 53.3% male and 46.7% female.

=== 2000 census ===
As of the census of 2000, there were 374 people, 129 households, and 87 families residing in the city. The population density was 902.0 inhabitants per square mile (348.3/km^{2}). There were 146 housing units at an average density of 352.1 per square mile (135.9/km^{2}). The racial makeup of the city was 90% White, 1% African American, 4% from other races, and 5% from two or more races. Hispanic or Latino people of any race were 8% of the population.

There were 129 households, out of which 45% had children under the age of 18 living with them, 47% were married couples living together, 14% had a female householder with no husband present, and 32% were non-families. 26% of all households were made up of individuals, and 9% had someone living alone who was 65 years of age or older. The average household size was 2.9 and the average family size was 3.5.

In the city, the population was spread out, with 35% under the age of 18, 13% from 18 to 24, 30% from 25 to 44, 17% from 45 to 64, and 5% who were 65 years of age or older. The median age was 27 years. For every 100 females, there were 92.8 males. For every 100 females age 18 and over, there were 93.6 males.

The median income for a household in the city was $35,313, and the median income for a family was $39,125. Males had a median income of $26,875 versus $24,896 for females. The per capita income for the city was $13,008. About 6.1% of families and 7.2% of the population were below the poverty line, including 9.5% of those under age 18 and none of those age 65 or over.

== Notable people ==
- William Harris (1841–1909), Kansas senator
- Charles Journeycake (1817–1894), founder of Linwood

== See also ==
- Disappearance of Randy Leach
