= Wecquaesgeek =

Historical Indigenous tribe in New York

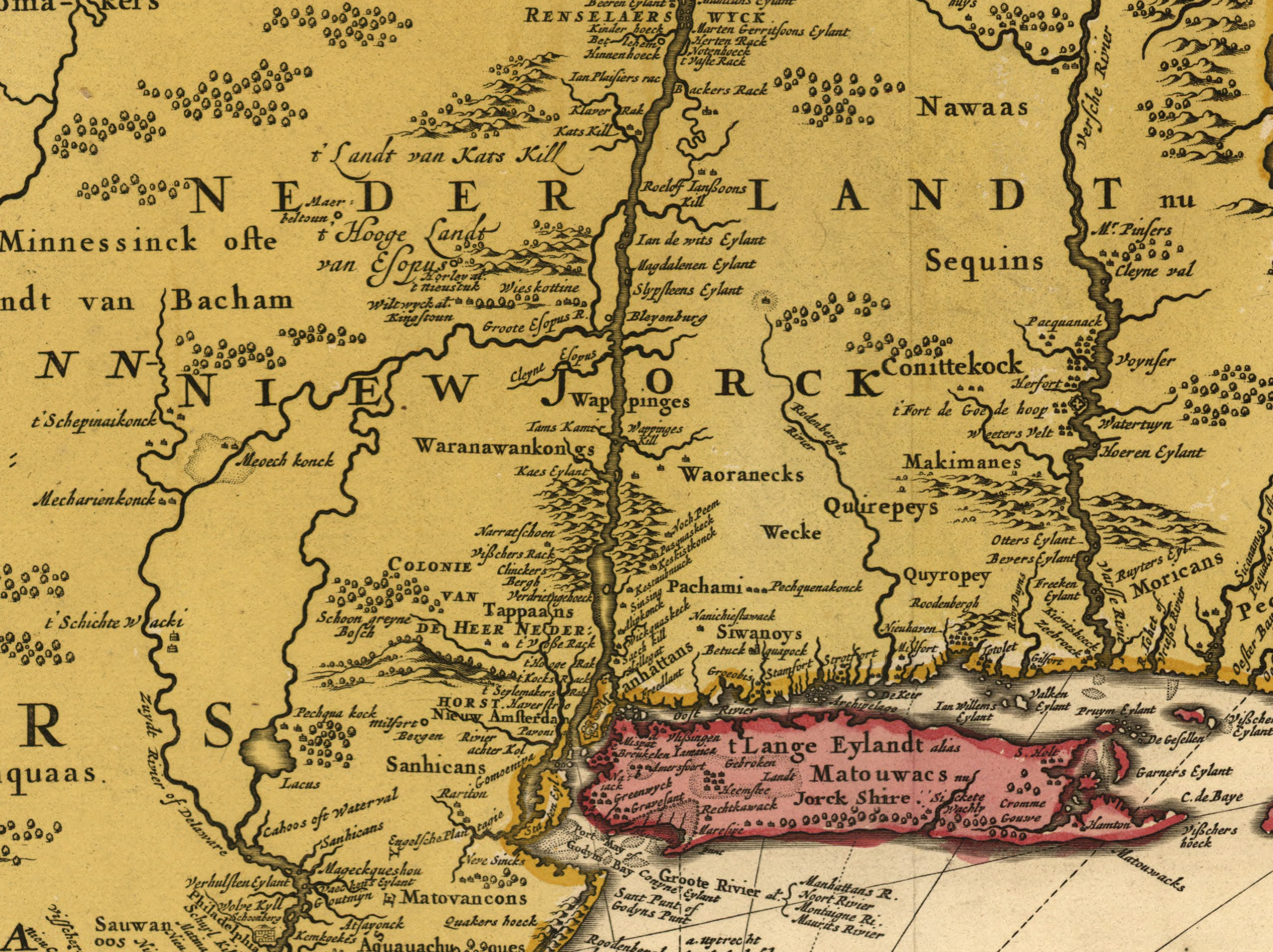
- This 1685 reprint of a 1656 map indicates "Wickquaskeck" in Westchester County above Manhattan island and "Manhattans" on it.

Total population
- No longer a distinct tribe

Regions with significant populations
- New York

Languages
- Munsee language

Religion
- Indigenous religion

Related ethnic groups
- other Lenape tribes

The Wecquaesgeek (also Manhattoe and Manhattan) were a Munsee-speaking band of Wappinger people who once lived along the east bank of the Hudson River in the southwest of today's Westchester County, New York, and down into the Bronx.

== History ==
The Wecquaesgeek resided along the southeastern banks of the Hudson River and fished local streams and lakes with rods and nets.

The Wecquaesgeek faced numerous conflicts with Dutch and English colonists. In 1609 two dugout canoes were sent from the Nipinichsen settlement to threaten Hendrik Hudson's ship in on his return trip down the river.

In the 1640s, the Wecquaesgeek settled the Raritan River and Raritan Bay after the Sanhicans migrated west. Once they settled there, colonists called them the Raritans.

Like other Wappinger people, the Wecquaesgeek suffered losses in Kieft's War between Dutch colonists and Indigenous tribes. Around half of the military-aged men remaining to the tribe died fighting on behalf of the American Revolutionary Army, though none was granted citizenship after victory, because they were considered by earlier treaties to be citizens of a separate nation.

Wicker's Creek in what is now called Dobbs Ferry was the last known residence of the tribe, which they occupied through the 17th century.

== Settlements ==
In his influential Beschryvinge van Nieuw-Nederlant (Description of New Netherland; 1655), large local landowner Adriaen van der Donck provided detailed information about the culture of local Native Americans. He wrote that their custom was to occupy fortified settlements (or "castles" as the Dutch colonists called them) in cold months and move to riverside villages for the summer. Sleepy Hollow historian Henry Steiner cites a 1642 description of one of these "castles" by an anonymous reporter: "...thirty Indians could have stood against two hundred soldiers since the castles were constructed of plank five inches thick, nine feet high, and braced around with thick balk full of port-holes."

The following settlements have been documented in historical accounts:

- Alipconk (Alipconck) – meaning 'a place of elms', located in what is now Tarrytown. It was burned by the Dutch in 1644.
- Nappeckamak – one of the main Weckquaesgeek settlements, which flanked the then Saeck Kill—today's Saw Mill River—at its confluence with the Hudson River in present-day Yonkers
- Nipinichsen – a fortified settlement at the north bank of Spuyten Duyvil Creek
- Rechouwakie – now known as Rockaway
- Rechtauck (Rechgawawank, Reckawawana) – in Lower East Side. In 1643, 40 Weckquaesgeek of all ages and genders were murdered here in the Massacre at Corlears Hook.
- Weckquasguck – a settlement located in what is now known as Dobbs Ferry and Hastings-on-Hudson where numerous artifacts have been found. The settlement ran along the Wysquaqua stream, now known as Wicker's Creek.

The Weckquaesgeek territories were bordered by the Sintsink to the north, below today's Ossining, and inland toward Long Island Sound to that of the Siwanoy, both related Wappinger bands.

To the south their range included the western part of today's Bronx along the Hudson and Harlem Rivers, and included the upper three-quarters of Manhattan island, which they did not permanently occupy but used as a hunting ground. Effectively it was their land that the Canarsee people of today's Brooklyn, who only occupied the very southern end of Manhattan island, an area known as the Manhattoes, sold to the Dutch.

The Dutch ended up with the island, and the Wecquaesgeek being called the "Manhattoe" or "Manhattan" Indians.

Today's Broadway follows one of their original trails, named "Wickquasgeck", after the "birch bark country" that lined it.

== Naming confusion ==
As was common practice early in the days of European settlement of North America, a people came to be associated with a place, with its name displacing theirs among the settlers and those associated with them, such as explorers, mapmakers, trading company superiors who sponsored many of the early settlements, and officials in the settlers' mother country in Europe.

Numerous variants of are found on historical maps and in period documents. These include: Wiechquaeskeck, Wechquaesqueck, Weckquaesqueek, Weekquaesguk, Wickquasgeck, Wickquasgek, Wiequaeskeek, Wiequashook, and Wiquaeskec. The meaning of the name has variously been given as "the end of the marsh, swamp or wet meadow", "place of the bark kettle", and "birch bark country".

Just as a name of one of their trails, the Wickquasgeck, was given to the people so another conflation by white settlers further confounded their identity, when they were mistakenly referred to as the Manhattoes after a place of that name on the southern tip of Manhattan Island. Compounding this was that the Manhattoes was the only part of Manhattan not occupied by the Wecquasgeek; it was a seasonal ground of the Canarsee, an Indigenous people of Long Island who lived across the East River in today's Brooklyn.

== See also ==
- Canarsee, the Native American band that sold Manhattan to the Dutch
