= Canarsee =

Historical Indigenous peoples of New York

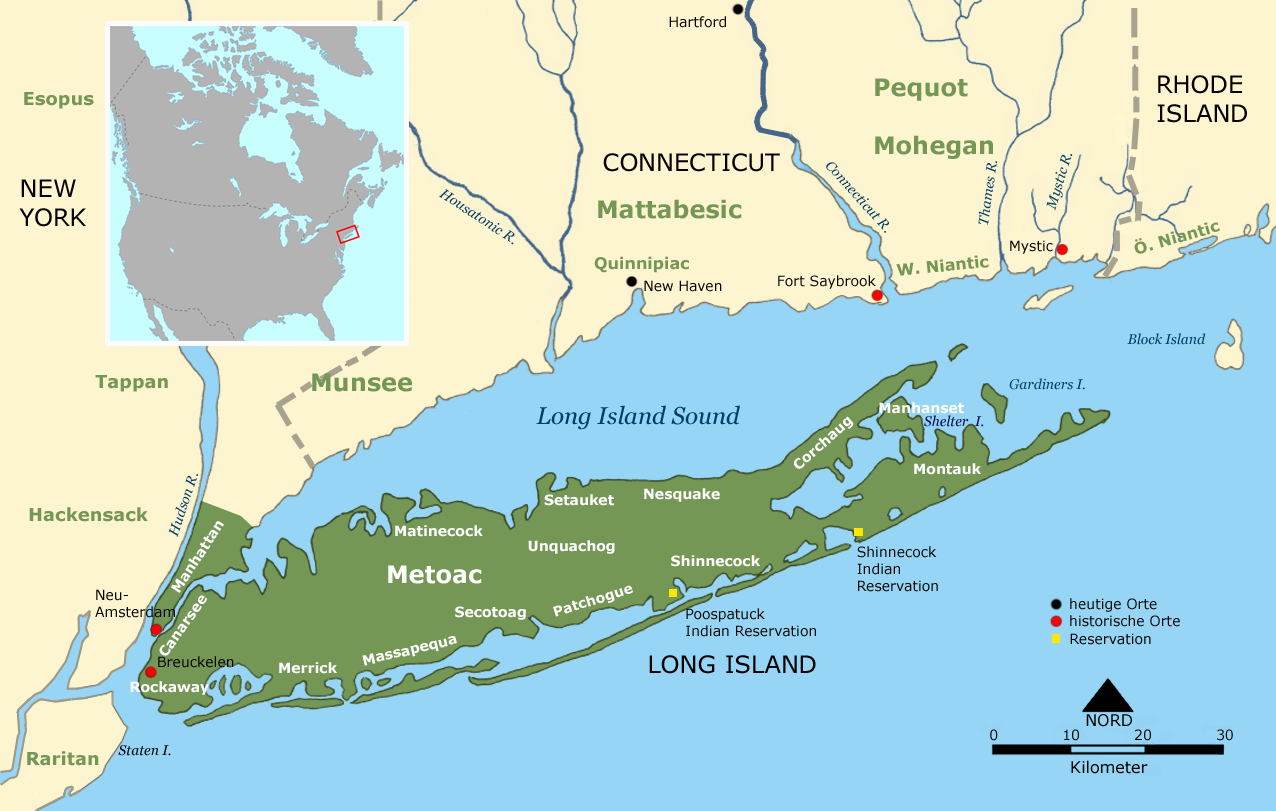
- The "Canarsee" are shown settled where Brooklyn is today.

Total population
- extinct as a tribe

Regions with significant populations
- Kings County, Long Island, and Staten Island, New York, U.S.

Languages
- Munsee language

Religion
- Indigenous religion

Related ethnic groups
- other Munsee people

The Canarsee were a band of Munsee-speaking Lenape who inhabited the westernmost end of Long Island and Staten Island at the time the Dutch colonized New Amsterdam in the 1620s and 1630s.

They are credited with selling the island of Manhattan to the Dutch, even though they only occupied its lower reaches, with the balance the seasonal hunting grounds of the Wecquaesgeek of the Wappinger people to the north.

== Name ==
As was common practice early in the days of white European colonisation of North America, a people came to be associated with a place, with its name displacing theirs among the colonies and those associated with them, such as explorers, mapmakers, trading company superiors who sponsored many of the early settlements, and officials in the colonizers' mother country in Europe. This was the case of the "Canarsee" people, also known as Canarsie and Canarse, as well as Canarise, Canarisse, and Canarsii, whose name, to the extent they identified with one, is lost in history. They were also called the Canarse and Canarsie.

The Canarsee were among the peoples who were inaccurately conflated with other Long Island bands into a supposed group called the "Metoac", an aggregation which failed to recognize their linguistic differences and varying tribal affinities.

The name lives on in Canarsie, a neighborhood of Brooklyn — a part of the City of New York which is on Long Island. Nyack at Fort Hamilton in Brooklyn was likely a Canarsee village.

== Sale of Manhattan ==
It is the "Canarse" [sic] (possibly from the Nyack Tract), who only utilized the very southern end of Manhattan island, the Manhattoes, as a hunting ground, who are credited with selling Peter Minuit the entirety of the island for $24 in 1626. A confusion of possession on the part of the Canarsees who failed to tell the Dutch that the balance of island was the hunting ground of the Wecquaesgeek, a Wappinger band of southwest Westchester County.

== Red Hook Lane Heritage Trail ==
Red Hook Lane, a Canarsee path thru the marshland was in colonial times the main trail from Brooklyn Heights to Red Hook. The Red Hook Lane Heritage Trail in Red Hook marks in a zig-zag fashion where the old indian trail was to Cypress Tree Island. It begins at the Red Hook Lane Arresick.
