= Lenape canoes =

Watercraft of Lenape culture

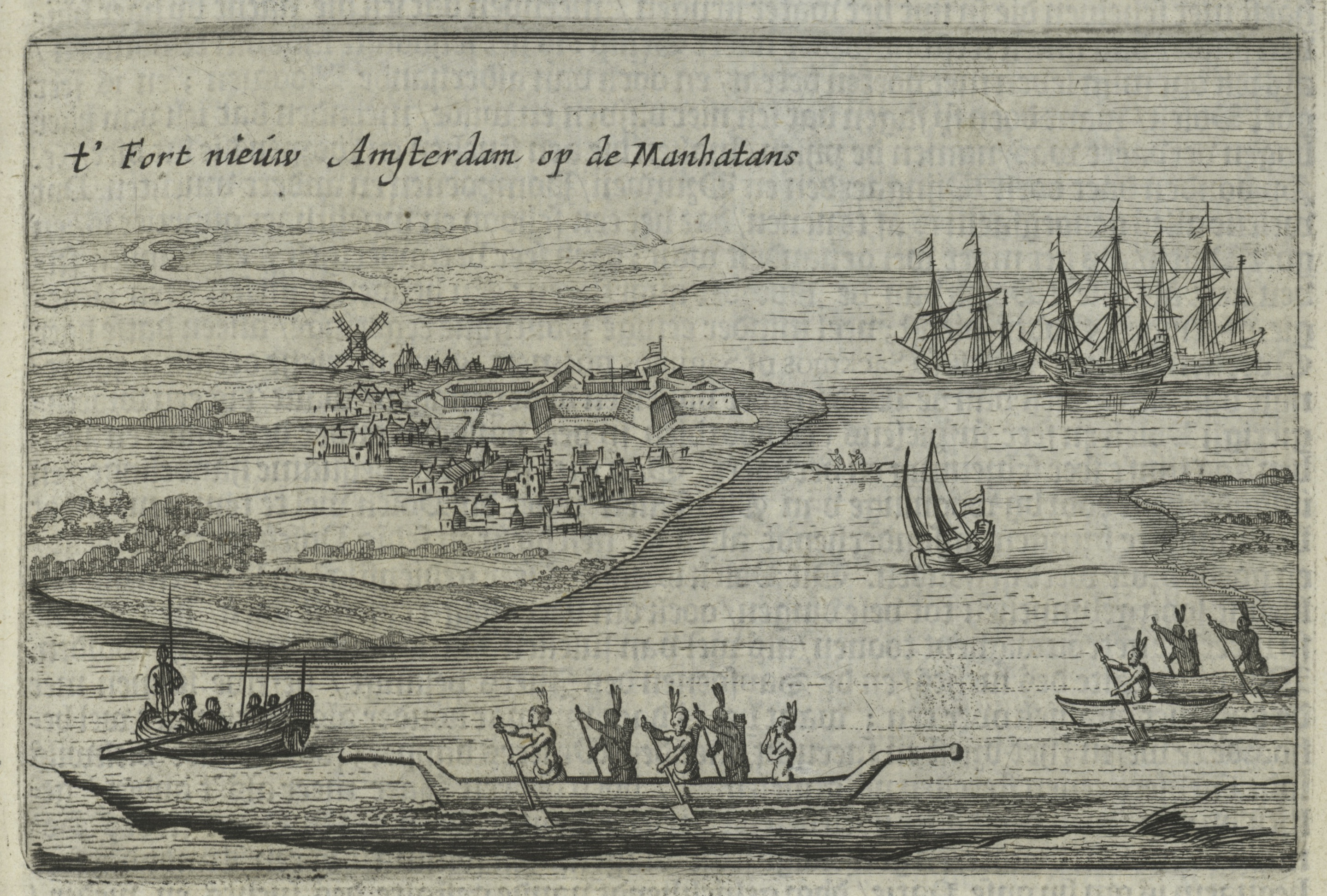
"Hartgers View" of New Amsterdam ca. 1627

Lenape canoes were dugout canoes of Lenapehoking. Tree trunks used were primarily of the American tulip tree (Delaware: mùxulhemënshi, "tree from which canoes are made"), and also of elm, white oak, chestnut or red cedar. Birch bark canoes were not used in the region.

== Design ==
Most examples were vessels intended for inland or harbor waters, of different sizes: mahelo possibly denoted a larger type, and amochol a smaller type. Some larger canoes are depicted in early Dutch illustrations with prow and stern extensions, possibly for tying up with hemp dogbane, though these depictions may be inaccurate. Lenape canoes were related to the mishoon dugouts of southern New England. Peter Lindeström recorded a kind of double-hulled catamaran among Lenape at New Sweden capable of travelling to New England or Virginia.

== Colonial interactions ==
Giovanni da Verrazzano in 1524 and Henry Hudson in 1609 were both met in New York Bay by an assembly of about 30 Lenape canoes.

Both dugout and birch bark canoe designs were copied by European settlers for local use.

In the early 18th century, according to the testimony of Abraham Houpt, Robert Durham of Durham Furnace developed the Durham boat based on an indigenous design, originally meant to haul pig iron down Scotts Creek through the Delaware to Philadelphia, and most famously used in George Washington's crossing of the Delaware River in 1776.

== Legacy ==
A preserved canoe in the Smithsonian National Museum of the American Indian was excavated from the Hackensack River by Frank Speck, and the institution also has a Lenape-attributed canoe paddle from Burlington County, New Jersey. The Bergen County Historical Society also claims to have an indigenous canoe from the Hackensack area. Another possibly indigenous canoe is in the American Museum of Natural History, excavated by New York Edison workers in 1906 from Manhattan's Cherry Street, though a later report describing its shape and repair with "rose-headed" hand wrought nails may exclude this. A dugout found at Wallenpaupack Creek in 1957 and on display at the Wallenpaupack Historical Society is likely too young to be of indigenous origin.

A 1996 Lenapehoking Festival pow wow at Sandy Hook in New Jersey included a canoe race starting at Red Bank's Oyster Point. Since 2002, the Lenape Nation of Pennsylvania has held the Rising Nation River Journey by canoe trip along the Delaware every four years, to commemorate the Treaty of Shackamaxon and to raise awareness for state recognition. The legacy of Lenape canoes is celebrated at the Whitehall Crossing, a 2005 permanent installation of stylized benches at the Staten Island Ferry Whitehall Terminal in New York City. A 2019 living history canoe ride by the Bronx River Alliance also commemorated this heritage.
