= Unami language =

Language spoken by the Lenape people

Unami
- Wënami èlixsuwakàn
- Native to: Eastern United States
- Region: Around the lower Delaware and Hudson rivers in the United States; some Unami groups in Oklahoma
- Ethnicity: Lenape
- Extinct: August 31, 2002, with the death of Edward Thompson
- Revival: Taught as a second language
- Language family: Algic: Algonquian; Eastern Algonquian; Delawaran; Delaware; Unami

Language codes
- ISO 639-3: unm
- Glottolog: unam1242
- ELP: Unami
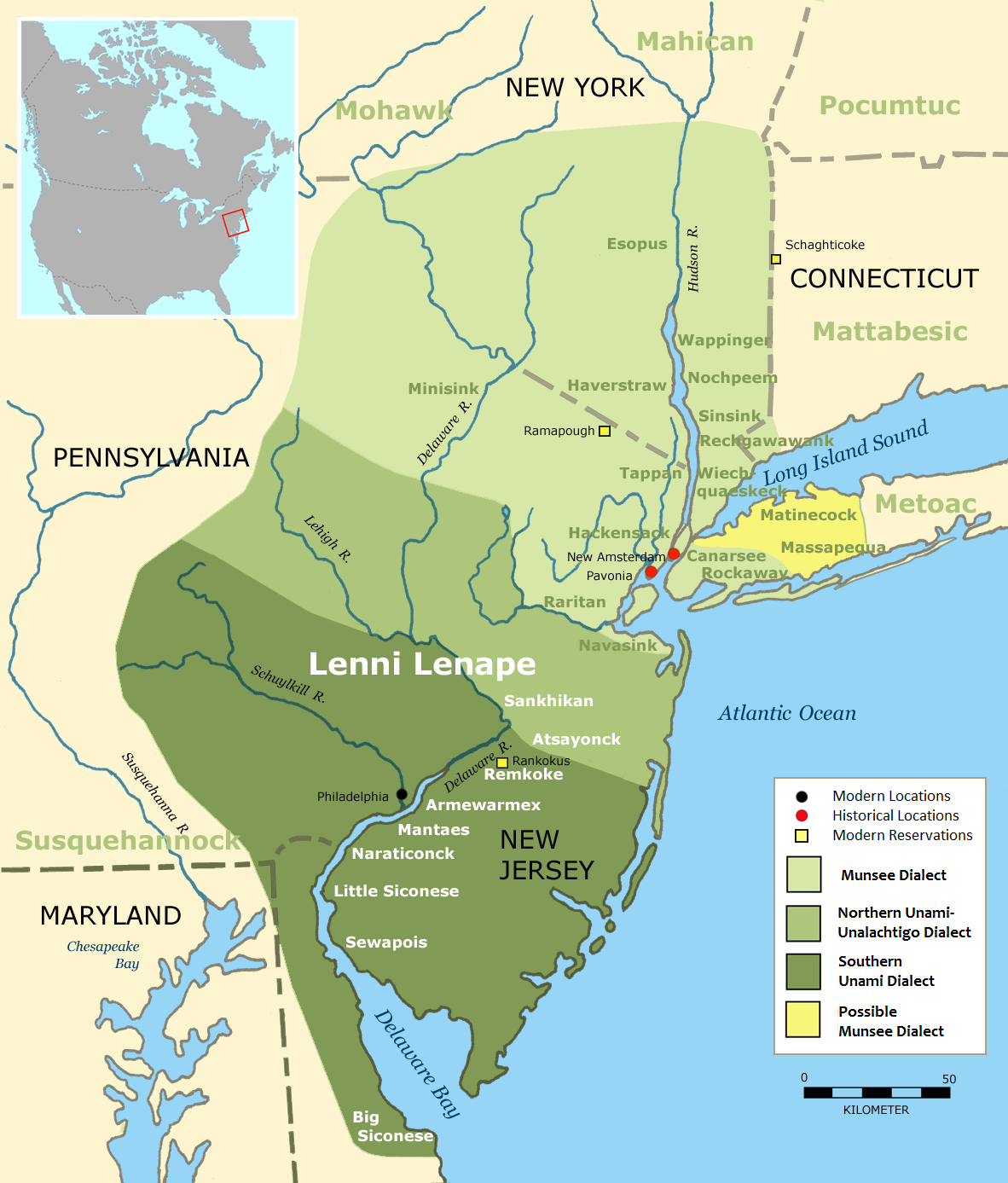
- Map showing the aboriginal boundaries of Delaware territories, with Munsee territory and Unami dialectal divisions indicated. The territory of the Unalachtigo dialect of Unami is not clearly indicated, but is presumed to be approximately in the area of "Sankhikan" on the map.

- Person: Wënami, Lënape
- People: Wënamiyok, Lënapeyok
- Language: Wënami èlixsuwakàn, Lënapei èlixsuwakàn
- Country: Lënapehòkink

Unami (Unami: Wënami èlixsuwakàn) is an Algonquian language initially spoken by southern Lenape people in the late 17th century and the early 18th century, who lived in the southern two-thirds of present-day New Jersey, southeastern Pennsylvania, and the northern two-thirds of Delaware. The Lenape later migrated, largely settling in Ontario, Canada, and Oklahoma. Today, Unami is spoken only as a second language.

Unami is one of two Delaware languages; the other is Munsee. The last fluent Unami speaker in the United States, Edward Thompson, of the federally recognized Delaware Tribe of Indians, died on August 31, 2002. His sister Nora Thompson Dean (1907–1984) provided valuable information about the language to linguists and other scholars.

Lenni-Lenape literally means 'Men of Men', but is translated to mean 'Original People'. The Lenape names for the areas they inhabited were Scheyichbi (i.e. New Jersey), which means 'water's edge', and Lenapehoking, meaning 'in the land of the Lenape'. It describes the ancient homeland of all Lenape-Delaware Indians, both Unami and Munsee.

The English colonists named the river running through much of the traditional range of the Lenape after their first governor of the Jamestown Colony, Lord De La Warr. They consequently referred to the people who lived around the river as "Delaware Indians".

== History ==
Unami is an Eastern Algonquian language. The hypothetical common ancestor language from which the Eastern Algonquian languages descend is Proto-Eastern Algonquian (PEA). An intermediate group, Delawarean, that is a descendant of Proto-Eastern Algonquian consists of Mahican and Common Delaware, the latter being a further subgroup comprising Munsee Delaware and Unami Delaware. The justification for Delawarean as an intermediate subgroup rests upon the high degree of similarity between Mahican and the two Delaware languages, but relatively little detailed argumentation in support of Delawarean has been adduced.

Compared to Munsee, Unami has undergone extensive phonological innovation, coupled with morphological regularization.

The PEA vowel system consisted of four long vowels *i·, *o·, *e·, *a·, and two short vowels *a and ə. The vowel history is as follows:

- *i· (from PEA merger of Proto-Algonquian (PA *i· and *i to PEA *i·),

" *o· (from PEA merger of PA *o· and *o ),

- *e· (from Proto-Algonquian *e·), and
- *a· (from Proto-Algonquian *a·;

The short vowels are:

- *ə (from Proto-Algonquian *e), and
- *a (from Proto-Algonquian *a).

This system was continued down to Common Delaware, but Munsee and Unami have innovated separately with respect to the vowel systems.

== Revival ==
The dominant modern version of the Southern Unami dialect called Lenape is taught by the Delaware Tribe of Indians, headquartered in Bartlesville, Oklahoma, which manages the Lenape Language Preservation Project. The same dialect was spoken by the Delaware Nation in Anadarko in the southwestern part of Oklahoma. Both Oklahoma and Delaware tribes have recorded native speakers and produced written lessons for instruction, which are available for sale from Various Indian Peoples Publishing Company, located in Texas. These efforts, in conjunction with other community efforts, comprise an attempt to preserve the language.

Some descriptions of the Northern Unami dialect as spoken during the 18th century are given by Moravian missionary John Heckewelder.

== Phonology ==
=== Consonants ===
Unami has been analyzed as having contrastive geminate and non-geminate obstruent consonants, although this contrast is relatively weak. A full analysis of the status of the geminates, also known as long consonants, is not available, and more than one analysis of Delaware consonants has been proposed. The long consonants are described as having low functional yield, and they differentiate relatively few pairs of words but occur in contrasting environments. Some examples of contrastive geminate pairs include: ná k·ə́ntka·n 'then you (sg.) danced' versus ná kə́ntka·n 'then there was dancing'; ní p·ɔ́·m 'his thigh' versus ní pɔ́·m 'the ham'; and nsa·s·a·k·ənə́mən 'I stuck it out repeatedly' versus nsa·sa·k·ənə́mən 'I stuck it out slowly'.

There are also rules that lengthen consonants in certain environments. The length mark (ː) is used to indicate gemination of a preceding consonant or vowel length, although in the literature on Unami the raised dot (·) is often used for these purposes, as other diacritics may be used above vowels (see below).

In the following chart, the usual transcription used in the sources is given with the IPA in brackets.

Consonants
	Bilabial	Dental	Postalveolar	Velar	Glottal
Plosive	/p/	/t̪/	/tʃ/	/k/	
Fricative		/s/	/ʃ/	/x/	/h/
Nasal	/m/	/n/			
Lateral		/l/			
Semivowel	/w/		/j/		

=== Vowels ===
Unami vowels are presented as organized into contrasting long–short pairs. One asymmetry is that high short /u/ is paired with long /oː/, and the pairing of long and short /ə/ is noteworthy. /ə/ and /o/ are not distinguishable before /w/, /m/, and /kw/. Additionally, vowels are classified as strong and weak, which plays an important role in determining stress (see below). Long vowels and vowels before consonant clusters are automatically strong. Certain short vowels, which are differentiated with a breve – /ĭ, ĕ, ŏ/ – are also strong vowels because they are treated morphophonemically as long vowels, even though they are pronounced as short. In a sequence of syllables containing a short vowel followed by a consonant (C) or consonant and /w/ (Cw), the odd-numbered vowels are weak, and the even numbered vowels are strong.

Furthermore, some short vowels are strong even in a weakening environment; such exceptions are often marked with a grave accent. Additionally, some vowels which are unaffected by predicted vowel syncope are marked with an acute accent. There is a predictable tendency, additionally, to nasalize and lengthen a vowel before /ns/ and /nš/, so that /lowé·nso/ ('his name is [such]') is realized closer to [luwé̹·su] from underlying /ələwe·nsəw/.

Long vowels
	Front	Central	Back
Close	iː		oː
Mid	eː	əː	ɔː
Open	aː		

Short vowels
	Front	Central	Back
Close	i		u
Mid	e	ə	ɔ
Open	a		

=== Syllable structure ===
Syllable structure is diverse, permitting a certain amount of consonant clustering. The following consonant clusters can occur:

- /m, n/ (which are realized as homorganic nasals) + /p, t, k, s, tʃ, ʃ/. These NC sequences are realized as single consonants, [b, d, ɡ, z, dʒ, ʒ], at the beginning of a word.
- /h/ + /p, t, tʃ, k, m, l/
- /s/ + /p, k/
- /x/ + /p, k/
- /tʃ/ + /k/

Additionally, certain consonants may combine with the semivowel /w/. Some underlying forms may also contain /sw/ and /šw/, but these are always removed by morphophonemic processes.

- /p, m, k, h/ + /w/

=== Stress ===
Stress is generally predictable in Unami. The rightmost nonfinal strong vowel is stressed, or a strong vowel in final position if it is the only one in the word. Often when stress would be expected to fall on the antepenult it is shifted to the penult. This change is found in three conjunct endings: /-ak/, /-at/, and /-an/. In the last case, the accent shifts to the penultimate /-an/ only if it would otherwise fall on an antepenultimate short vowel, and if the consonant between them is voiced.

=== Phonological processes ===
Unami phonology is extremely complex, with various morphophonological rules, and a theoretical form usually undergoes a set of predictable phonological processes to produce the true form found in speech. There are about 17 such rules common to both Munsee and Unami, and another 28 unique to Unami, though this analysis ignores predictable exceptions, such as the class of static words which may skip many of these rules. These rules govern things such as consonant lengthening/shortening, vowel syncopation, metathesis, vowel coloring, etc.

A list of processes unique to Unami follow. These are written in linguistic notation. Thus, {ə,a} → ∅ / _{h, x}V when {ə,a} are weak means that the sounds /ə/ and /a/ become null (disappear) in the context of when they are weak and appear before either /h/ or /x/ and another vowel. The slash means 'in the context of', and the underscore _ indicates where the /ə/ or /a/ must occur. In some notations the pound symbol (#) appears, indicating word boundaries (either the beginning or end). Regular parenthesis indicate optional conditions when framing phonemes or additional information about phonemes: "C=stop". The capital letters C, V, and N mean 'consonant', 'vowel', and 'nasal' respectively.

- U-1: Weak and strong vowel marking
- U-2: Weak short vowel loss before gutturals /h/ and /x/: /kənalhó·xwe/ ('you walk upstream') versus /nalahó·xwe·(w)/ ('he walks upstream')
  - {ə,a} when /ə,a/ are weak→ ∅ / _{h, x}V
- U-3: Vowel-coloring; underlying /ə/ may be color to /i/ /o/ or /a/ in various environments.
  - ə → o / _ {(k)w} -- although Goddard notes that this orthography may be imperfect because surface-phonemic /ə/ and /o/ are not distinct before /w/, /m/ and /kw/. Cf. /pko/ ('vegetable gum', underlying /pəkəw/) with /mpok·ó·yom/ ('my gum') but /mpək·ó·he/ ('I gather gum').
  - ə → i / _ {y}
  - ə → o / _ h{p, kw, m, w}
  - ə → i / _ h elsewhere
  - ə → o / _ {Np, Nkw} and // w_Nk
  - ə → i / _ Nk elsewhere
  - ə → o / _x{p, kw}
  - ə → a / _x elsewhere
- U-4: Vowel shortening before primary cluster of a nasal and another consonant
  - V̄ → V̌ / _ NC
- U-5: Semivowel assimilation
  - {w, y}h → hh / V̌_
- U-6: Stop lengthening
  - C^(vl≠h) → C· / V_(s, š, x) where V is strong
- U-7: /h/-metathesis
  - V̌hC → hV̌C except / VC_ where V is weak
- U-8: An adjustment in vowel length before /hC/ (an /h/ and another consonant)
  - V → V̌ / _hC (voiced C)
  - V → V̄ / _hC (voiceless C)
- U-9: /h/-loss before stop consonant
  - hC (C=stop) → C
- U-10: Nasal assimilation, part 1
  - NC (C=stop) → homorganic nasal + voiced stop
  - NC (C=continuant) → ^{n}C / V_
- U-11: Vowel-weakening and syncope (with certain exceptions)
  - a → ah / CV (/a/ is weak; C=voiceless) except some a (a=weak) → ∅ / #n_CV (C=voiceless)
  - ə → ∅ / _CV (/ə/ is weak; C=voiceless) and / l_{n, l}, y_l, w_w, m_m and / #(n)_{n, l}V
- U-12: Nasal assimilation, part 2
  - nC (C=voiceless; C≠/x,h/) → homorganic nasal + C (C=voiced) / #_
  - V^{n}C → Ṽ·C (most speakers)
- U-13: Voiced consonant assimilation
  - C(x)C(y) (C=voiced constituant) → C^{y}C^{y}
- U-14: Vowel syncope before /xCV/, in which exceptions are marked with a grave accent
  - V̌ → ∅ / _{x, s, š}CV except / VC_ (where V=weak)
- U-15: /h/-loss in clusters
  - h → ∅ / _{CC, C#, Cah}
- U-16: Vowel shortening
  - V̄ → V̌ / _h(ə)CV and // _CC (C=voiced) and / _C·ah
- U-17: /mə/-loss
  - V́hməna· → V́hna·
- U-18: /ə/-insertion
  - ∅ → ə / h_{l, n, m} and / #{l, m}_C (C≠h)
- U-19: Metathesis of /w/. Does not affect the roots /wəl-/ 'well' and /wət-/ 'pull'.
  - w(ə)C^{1}(w) → Cw / #_V if C^{1}=/p, m, k, h/
  - w(ə)C → Cw / #_{ah, a, a·}
  - {/nəw/, /kəw/} → {nw, kw} / #_{ah, a, a·}
  - w{h, x} → {hw, xw} / C_
  - x → xw / o(·)_
  - (k)wx(k) → (k)x(k)w / #_
- U-20: /w/-coloring of /a/-vowels and /w/-loss
  - w{ah, a, a·} → {oh, ɔ, ɔ·} / {#,C,V}_ where C is not /w/ and V is not /o(·)/
  - w → ∅ / V^{1}_V^{2} where V^{1} is not /o(·)/ and V^{2} is not /ə/
  - w → ∅ / (C)_o(·)
- U-21: /y/-adjustment
  - y → ∅ / V̄_V^{1} where V^{1} is not /ə/
  - ∅ → y / V^{1}_V^{2} where V^{1} is a front vowel and V^{2} is a back vowel
  - w → y / _k (only in the suffixes _{1}/-əkw/ and _{1}/-əke·/)
- U-22: Final /l/-loss. The dropping of the /l/ is optional, but the option is exploited differently by the two morphemes it affects.
  - l → (l) / _#
- U-23: Final-vowel shortening
  - V̄ → V̆ / _#
- U-24: Final /h/-, /w/-, and /y/-loss
  - h → ∅ / _#
  - w → (w) / V̄_#
  - w → ∅ / o(·)_#
  - w → ∅ / #_tə{l, n}
  - y → ∅ / i_#
- U-25: Initial cluster and syllable loss. Initial clusters arising from morphophonemic rules U-11 and U-14 above are simplified; many initial weak-vowel syllables are lost. There are many exceptions, however, such that Goddard does not attempt to describe the pattern.
- U-26: Consonant-shortening
  - C·(w) → C(w) / _{ah, oh, C, #}
- U-27: Consonant-lengthening
  - C (C=stop) → C· / #(C)hV̆_V(C)#
- U-28: Negative vowel assimilation in forms with _{5}/-(o·)w(i·)/, which was a recent innovation at the time Goddard was writing.
  - V̄^{x}(w)i → V̄^{x}V̆^{x} / _#

== Morphology ==
=== Nouns ===
Third person participants are marked for gender (animate versus inanimate), obviation (proximate versus obviative), and presence (nonabsentative versus absentative). Generally, the inanimate, obviative, and absentative categories are more marked than their opposites (i.e. animate, proximate, and nonabsentative), but it is not clear whether animacy or inanimacy is the more marked of the opposition. The first and second persons are not marked for presence or obviation and are always animate.

==== Obviation ====
The first mentioned and/or primary animate third person is proximate; all other third persons are obviative, unless they act in conjunction with the proximate participant. Verbs are also inflected to indicate whether the verbal action is proximate on obviate or obviate on proximate.

==== Presence ====
Third-person participants can be marked by a special set of endings indicating their absence from the general area of the focus of discourse. For example, absentative endings are used when speaking of the deceased (even if the corpse is physically present), as in the sentence no·lăčahko·ná·na nkahe·səná·na ('our (excl.) mother (abv.) treated us well'), in which both verb and noun are marked with the absentative /-a/ ending.

==== Gender ====
Nouns in Unami are classified as animate or inanimate, which is reflected in verbal conjugation. Animate nouns denote human beings, animals, spirits, trees, and certain fruits, tubers, root vegetables, and other unpredictable exceptions like ko·n ('snow') and nhíkaš ('my fingernail'). (However, berries, nuts, and vegetables growing above ground are generally inanimate.) Thus, té·hi·m ('strawberry'), xáskwi·m ('corn'), ke·skúnthak ('pumpkin'), mpi ('water'), and nhíka·t ('my leg') are inanimate, while lə́nu ('man'), xho·k ('snake'), mahtán'tu ('Devil') and hɔ́pəni·s ('potato') are animate. However, traditionally inanimate nouns which are directly addressed or personified are treated as animate. Thus, traditionally inanimate ăsǝ́n ('stone') is treated as animate in the sentence šá·i a· ăsǝ́nak kǝnčí·mowak ('the stones would immediately cry out').

=== Verbs ===
Unami is a highly agglutinative, polysynthetic language. Verbs in Unami are marked for person and number, and contain inflectional elements of order (independent, conjunct, and imperative), aspect, and the negative.

A table of the personal pronouns is given below. The first person plural ("we") may be either inclusive (including the addressee) or exclusive.

Personal pronouns
Person	Singular	Plural	
First	ni·	ni·ló·na (exclusive)	ki·ló·na (inclusive)
Second	ki·	ki·ló·wa	
Third	né·k·a	ne·k·a·ɔ	
Indefinite	∅ (zero ending)	∅ (zero ending)	

Following are tables exemplifying verbal paradigms in Unami in the independent order, indicative mood and present tense.

==== Animate intransitive (AI) verbs ====
Animate intransitive independent indicative
Person	/kəntəka·-/ 'dance'	/wəm-/ 'come from'
1,2	nkə́ntka /n-,k--/	no·m /n-,k--/
3	kə́ntke·(w) /-w/	wəm /-w/
1p,12	nkəntkáhəna /n-,k--hməna·/	no·mhóməna /n-,k--hməna·/
2p	kkəntkáhəmɔ /k--hmwa·/	ko·mhómɔ /k--hmwa·/
3p	kəntké·yɔk /-wak/	mo·k /-wak/
X	kə́ntkan /-n/	xahé·lən /-n/

==== Transitive animate (TA) verbs ====
Transitive animate independent indicative, theme 1
	Objective mi·l- 'give to'		Absolute lo·sw 'burn'
Person	3	3p	-
1,2	nǝmí·la /n-,k--a·/	nǝmi·lá·ɔk /n-,k--a·wak/	nló·sa /n-,k--a·/
3	mwi·lá·ɔ /w--a·wa(l)/	mwi·lá·ɔ /w--a·wa(l)/	ló·se·(w) /-e·w/
1p,12	nǝmi·lá·wǝna /n-,k--a·wǝna·/	nǝmi·la·wǝná·na(·)k /n-,k--a·wǝnă̆·k/	nlo·sáhǝna /n-,k--a·hmǝna·/
2p	kǝmi·láwwa /k--a·wǝwa·/	kǝmi·láwwa·ɔk /k--a·wǝwa·wak/	kǝlo·sáhǝmɔ /k--a·hmwa·/
3p	mwi·lawwá·ɔ /w--a·wǝwa·wa(l)/	mwi·lawwá·ɔ /w--a·wǝwa·wa(l)/	lo·sé·yɔk /-ǝ·wak/
X	mí·la·(w) /a·w/	mí·l·á·ɔk /a·wak/	N/A

==== Inanimate intransitive (II) verbs ====
Inanimate intransitive independent indicative
Person	màxhe·- 'be red'	alǝt- 'rot'
IN	máxke·(w) /-w/	alǝ́t /-w/
IN pl.	maxké·yɔ(l) /-wa(l)/	alǝ́t·o(·l) /-wa(l)/

==== Transitive inanimate (TI) verbs ====
The TI themes have the same inflection as AI stems for all conjuncts. (Indefinite subject forms of consonant-final themes are not attested, but the vowel-final themes follow the AI pattern.) Three forms are illustrated from each type.

Transitive inanimate independent indicative
Type	Subjects		
	2	3	3pl
1a	pǝnáman /-aman/	pǝnánk /-ank/	pǝnamhíti·t /-amǝh(ǝ)ti·t/
1b	ló·sǝman /-ǝman/	ló·sink /-ǝnk/	lo·sǝmíhti·t /-ǝmǝh(ǝ)ti·t/
2	wǝlí·taɔn /-awan/	wǝlí·ta·kw /-a·kw/	wǝli·tóhti·t /-o·h(ǝ)ti·t/
3(/-C/)	né·man /-an/	nenk /-ǝk/	ne·mhíti·t /-ǝ·h(ǝ)ti·t/
3(/-V)	mí·č·iyan /-yan/	mí·č·i·t /-t/	mi·č·íhti·t /-h(ǝ)ti·t/

=== Affixes ===
==== Prefixes ====
Verbal prefixes are used only in the independent order, although some forms of the independent order lack a prefix. There are three of them: /n-/ (first person), /k-/ (second person), and /w-/ (third person). If a stem has an underlying initial vowel, a /t/ is inserted after the prefix, and before this and other stem-initial consonants a /ə/ is inserted. Sometimes, this /ə/ contracts with a stem-initial /wə/ to /o·/ except when the /o·/ would be phonetically shortened via rule U-4a. Examples include: /ntá·mwi/ ('I get up from lying') versus /á·mwi·(w)/ ('he gets up'). Two roots with initial /t/ extend the syllable with /-ən/ when adding prefixes; these roots are /tal-/ ('there') and /tax-/ ('so many'), e.g. náni ntəntala·wsí·ne·n ('that is where we live [our lives]') from the animate intransitive stem /tala·wəsi·/.

Prefixes are mutually exclusive and are selected based on the following rule: if one of the participants is second person, the second person prefix is used; if not, if one of the participants is the first person, then the first person prefix is used; if none of these applies, other forms, if they take a prefix, take the third person prefix. This is the well-known Algonquian 2-1-3 precedence rule.

==== Suffixes ====
Suffixes are grouped into eight positional classes. These are:

- Theme
  1. Theme signs
- Thematic affixes
- Diminutive and pejorative
  1. Obviative and plural
  2. Negative; imperative modes
- Desinences (inflectional suffixes)
  5. Central endings
  6. Aspect
  7. Peripheral endings
  8. Mode

===== First position =====
The first position (theme signs) is filled only for transitive verbs and help describe the relationship between the two participants by indicating which is the agent and which is the object. The direct and inverse theme signs indicate the direction of the verb along a spectrum what might be called distance. From least to most distant the participants are: (1) first or second; (2) indefinite (only as subject); (3) proximate third person; (4) obviative third person; (5) farther obviative third person; (6) inanimate (subject only). If the subject is less distant than the object, the direct theme is used; if the subject is more distant, the inverse signs are used. After transitive animate (TA) verb stems appear one of the four following theme signs:

- Theme 1: _{1}/-a·/ ~ _{1}/-∅/; makes direct forms
- Theme 2: _{1}/-əkw/ ~ _{1}/-əke·/; makes inverse forms
- Theme 3: _{1}/-i·/; makes first person object forms
- Theme 4: _{1}/-əl/; makes second person forms

For transitive inanimate (TI) verbs, there appears the theme sign pertaining to the appropriate TI class:

- Class 1a: _{1}/-am/
- Class 1b: _{1}/-əm/
- Class 2: _{1}/-o·/ ~ _{1}/-aw/
- Class 3: no theme sign

For Class 2 TI theme signs, in certain derivational categories, the theme sign is retained even when the thematic element is dropped. The contrast between both categories is sharper in the Central Algonquian languages, whose theme sign has a more complex series of alternants.

===== Second position =====
The second position consists of diminutives in _{2}/-tī/ and pejoratives in _{2}/-šī/ (in both of these, the /-ī/ is unstable.) An example of a diminutive is /pé·t·o/ ('the little one comes'), contrasted with the pejorative /pé·šo/ ('the undesirable one came'). The use of /t/ in the formation of diminutives seems to be an innovation of Unami, as many other Algonquian languages use */s/ or */ʃ/ (in fact, the diminutive of Munsee is /-šī/).

===== Third position =====
In position three are the affixes _{3}/-lī/, which marks the obviative third person, and _{3}/-h(ə)tī/, which marks the plural.

===== Fourth position =====
Position four contains the negative affix _{4}/-(ō)w(ī)/ and prohibitive imperative and future imperative forms, which have complex series of alternants.

===== Fifth position =====
Position five contains the central endings which index the central participant of each form, except those using TA theme signs _{1}/-i·/ and _{1}/-əl/;

===== Sixth position =====
Position six contains the affix endings: /-pan/ marks the preterite, and /sa/ ~ /shan/ mark the present.

===== Seventh position =====
Position seven contains peripheral endings, which are used to mark the nominal category of some 3rd person participants in forms in the independent and conjunct (but not imperative) orders.

===== Eighth position =====
Position eight reflects the subjunctive, prohibitive, and future modes.

== Syntax ==
Unami is, like many Algonquian languages, polysynthetic and highly agglutinative. This means that most of the information is encoded in the verb (sometimes with whole words being incorporated into the stem), making word order more fluid than in English. Syntax is one of the least studied aspects of the Unami language; there is much more data on morphology, because of an especial focus on reconstructing Proto-Algonquian.

Some examples of complex sentences in Unami include:

- ta heč tɔllí·ksi·n ne·k ma·nšá·p·iyak? ('what color are those beads?')
- še· lah ni e·k·aɔ́·kwe [tali-]phɔkhakéhɔ·n ní·ša awé·ni·k ('over there under the trees two people were buried')
- mi·mə́nsak šokw təli-ahi-pe·nháto·n ('but the children's footprints are numerous')
- na hont náni tənnə́mən níkahke pi·lae·č·əč·ínka ('then that's what those boys did')
