= Delaware Tribe of Indians =

Federally recognized Lenape tribe in Oklahoma

Delaware Tribe of Indians Lënape (Unami)
- Domestic dependent nation
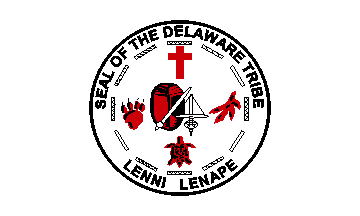
- Flag

- Location in the United States
- Coordinates: 36°45′29.52″N 95°55′8.15″W
- First U.S. Recognition: 1975
- Second Recognition: 1991
- Third Recognition: 2009
- Capital: Bartlesville, OK

Government
  - Type: Tribal Council
  - Chief: Brad KillsCrow
  - Assistant Chief: Tonya Anna
- Demonym: Lenape

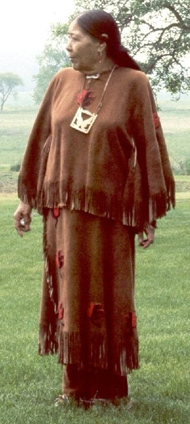
Nora Thompson Dean (1907–1984), a tribal citizen, language educator, and herbalist, c. 1973

The Delaware Tribe of Indians based in Bartlesville, Oklahoma, is one of three federally recognized tribes of the Lenape people in the United States. The others are the Delaware Nation based in Anadarko, Oklahoma, and the Stockbridge-Munsee Community of Wisconsin. More Lenape or Delaware people live in Canada.

They have also been called the Eastern Delaware, Cherokee Delaware, and the Delaware Tribe of Eastern Oklahoma.

== Government ==
The Delaware Tribe of Indians is headquartered in Bartlesville, Oklahoma (Delaware: Kamink). They have no tribal jurisdictional area.

As of 2025, the current administration is:

- Chief: Brad KillsCrow
- Assistant Chief: Tonya Anna
- Treasurer: Rusty Creed Brown
- Member: Kay Anderson
- Member: Bonnie Jo Griffith
- Member: Lindsey Harris
- Member: Shaunda Stanley

== Enrollment ==
Tribal citizenship is limited exclusively to descendants of Lenape people on the 1906 tribal rolls from Indian Territory. Enrollment is based on lineal descent; that is, there are no minimum blood quantum requirements.

== Economic developments ==
Their annual tribal economic impact is $2 million.

The tribe's housing program covers Washington, Nowata, Rogers, Craig, and part of Tulsa counties.

The tribe owns Tahkox E2, Lenape Reserve, a ranch, and Teton Trade Cloth by Lenape.

== Culture ==
The Council of Lenape Elders works to sustain traditional dances, culture, and the tribal language, and works with the Delaware Gourd Society. The tribe maintains the Delaware Center on an 80-acre (320,000 m^{2}) parcel of land in Bartlesville. Delaware artists are known for their wood carving and ribbon work skills.

== History ==
The historically Algonquian-speaking Delaware refer to themselves as Lenape. At first European contact in the early 17th century, the tribe lived along the Delaware River, named for Lord de la Warr, territory in lower present-day New York State, including and western Long Island, New York, and Eastern New Jersey.

The Lenape were the first tribe to sign a treaty with the new United States. They signed the treaty on September 17, 1778. Despite the treaty, the Lenape were forced to cede their Eastern lands and moved first to Ohio and later to Indiana (Plainfield), Missouri, Kansas, and Indian Territory. The ancestors of the Delaware Nation, following a different migration route, settled in Anadarko. Other Lenape bands moved north with the Iroquois after the American Revolutionary War to form two reserves in Ontario, Canada.

Traditionally, the Lenape were divided into the Munsee, Unami, and Unalachtigo, three social divisions determined by language and location.

== Federal recognition ==
=== First recognition ===
After dealing with the United States on a government-to-government basis as a domestic dependent nation, the ancestors of the Delaware Tribe of Indians agreed in 1867 to relocate to the Cherokee Nation in what was then Indian Territory. The Delaware Tribe of Indians operated autonomously on a tract of land they thought they had outright purchased in the lands of the Cherokee Nation.

Following passage of the 1972 Appropriations Act, the Bureau of Indian Affairs (BIA) reviewed the 1958 Bylaws of the Delaware Tribe of Indians. It recommended that the tribe adopt enrollment criteria to comply with the distribution requirements of the Act. In a General Council meeting, the Delaware Tribe amended its bylaws to include such criteria, and the BIA approved the amendments on September 30, 1974. In 1975, the BIA certified that the Delaware Tribe's amended bylaws provided "the legal entity which in the judgment of the Secretary of Interior adequately protects the interest of the Delaware Tribe of Indians pursuant to the [1972 Appropriations Act]." Due to a suit filed by the Kansas Delaware, a non-recognized tribe, BIA reviewed all federally recognized Delaware tribes' legal documents. Then in 1979, BIA revoked the Delaware Tribe of Indians' status, stating that the removal to Oklahoma in 1879 with the Cherokees effectively placed the tribe under the authority of the Cherokee Nation. The BIA had determined that the Department of the Interior would generally engage in government-to-government relations with the Delaware Tribe only indirectly through the Cherokee Nation, and that the Department would engage in direct relations with the Delaware Tribe solely with respect to the Tribe's claims against the United States.

=== Second recognition ===
The Delaware Tribe of Indians regained their federal recognition by the Secretary of the Interior in 1991, when the BIA rescinded its 1979 decision. However, the Cherokee Nation disagreed with the decision and filed suit against the BIA and the Secretary of their decision. The Cherokee Nation's position was upheld in court, leading to the Delaware Tribe's loss of federal recognition in 2004. After years of negotiations, the two tribes resolved their differences through an agreement in October 2008. Delaware voters approved the agreement and voted to reorganize in May 2009, under the authority of the Oklahoma Indian Welfare Act.

=== Third recognition ===
On July 28, 2009, the United States Department of the Interior notified the tribal office in Bartlesville that the Delaware were again officially recognized by the U.S. government.

== Notable tribal citizens ==
- Joanne Barker, professor, author
- Dan Barker, author, musician, activist
- Joseph L. Bull, biomedical engineer and the first enrolled tribal citizen to serve as a dean of an engineering college in the United States
- Nora Thompson Dean (Touching Leaves Woman, 1907–1984), traditionalist, herbalist, and language instructor
- Charles Journeycake, Neshapanacumin (1817–1894), Principal Chief of the Delaware Tribe

== See also ==
- List of federally recognized tribal governments of Lenape
  - Delaware First Nation of Six Nations, Ontario (member of the Haudenosaunee Confederacy)
  - Delaware Nation, Oklahoma
  - Delaware Nation at Moraviantown, Ontario (Christian Munsee)
  - Delaware Tribe of Indians, Oklahoma
  - Munsee-Delaware Nation, Ontario
  - Stockbridge-Munsee Community, Wisconsin (Partially Lenape, also Mohican)
