= Disappearance of Randy Leach =

1988 disappearance in Kansas, U.S.

- Leach in an undated photograph
- Born: July 25, 1970
- Disappeared: April 16, 1988 (aged 17); Linwood, Kansas, US
- Status: Missing for 38 years, 5 months and 27 days

In the early morning hours of April 16, 1988, 17-year-old Randy Wayne Leach disappeared from a house party in rural Linwood, Kansas. Numerous theories have been proposed in relation to the case, including the possibility of satanism being involved and that Leach had driven a car off Golden Road into a creek.

== Disappearance and search efforts ==
On April 15, 1988, Leach attended a party hosted at the Erwin residence located east of Linwood; 70 to 150 others were in attendance. At the time he was a week away from graduating Basehor-Linwood High School. He had arrived at the party after 9:00 p.m., and within an hour became drunk. He was observed laying on the hood of his vehicle before disappearing from the party. The following day, his mother alerted authorities to the fact that he had failed to return home. Police had initially suspected that Leach may have run away but a more in-depth investigation by the Kansas Bureau of Investigation (KBI) had determined that foul play was involved in relation to the case and that he had not left of his own accord. The 1985 Dodge 600 sedan with license plate LVJ8721 that he had driven to the party also went missing. By 7:00 a.m. police had arrived at the home, although there had been no sign that a party had ever taken place. The house where the party was held burned to the ground shortly after his disappearance; the local sheriff determined that the fire may have had a suspicious origin.

Two days later, a classmate alleged that someone had brandished a knife in a Walmart parking lot and that he had stated "this is what we used to sacrifice Randy". Two knives and a Dungeons & Dragons manual were confiscated in relation to Leach's disappearance, triggering what became known in town as the "satanic panic". It was additionally rumored that Leach had died in caves located at 12755 Loring Drive. At one point during the investigation, authorities received a tip that a man had been abducted and taken to the caves, where he had seen a person hanging that looked similar to Leach.

The possibility of Leach driving his car into the Stranger Creek on Golden Road was proposed by KBI investigator Timothy Dennis. It was initially met with pushback by other investigators due to the creek's depth but observations of the creek and data from the United States Army Corps of Engineers determined that the creek could reasonably conceal a vehicle throughout an entire year. A sonar search of the creek detected a vehicle, and a piece of plastic molding was recovered by divers. The vehicle was determined not to be involved in Leach's disappearance; a separate stolen vehicle found during another search of the creek was also determined to be uninvolved. It was noted that the creek's current pushed the stolen vehicle past pilings on a bridge along the creek and that Leach's vehicle may have suffered a similar fate, being driven into the creek and carried by the current an undetermined distance.

In August 2026, it was announced that a possible location was under investigation by a former police officer in relation to his disappearance.

The Kansas Bureau of Investigation offered $5,000 for any information leading to a successful solving of the disappearance.

== 2006 play ==
In 2006, Tim Macy wrote a play based on Leach's disappearance titled Leaves of Words. The play chronicles the events leading up to and following his disappearance; it is from the perspective of Randy's father.

== See also ==
- List of people who disappeared mysteriously (1980s)
- List of murdered American children
