= Jasper Danckaerts =

Founder of a Labadist colony in modern-day Maryland, USA

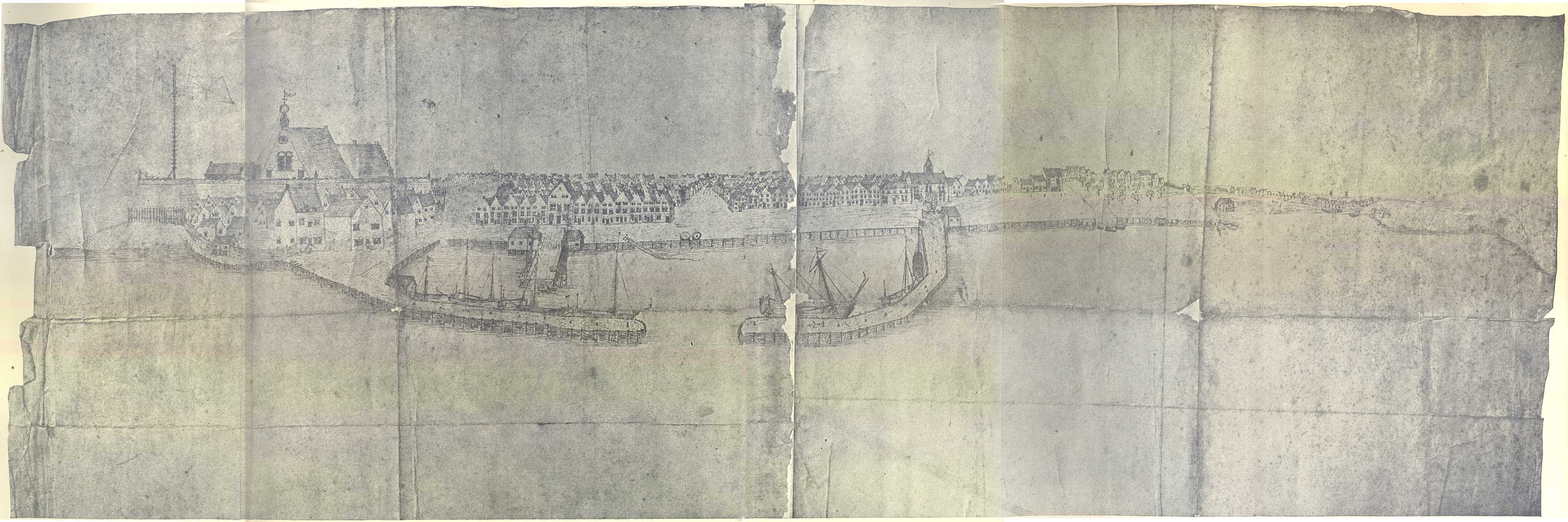
Map of New York from Brooklyn Heights, based on a 1679 original by Danckaerts

Jasper Danckaerts (7 May 1639, in Vlissingen – 1702/04, in Middelburg) was the founder of a colony of Labadists along the Bohemia River in what is now the US state of Maryland. He is known for his journal, kept while traveling through the territory which had previously been part of the New Netherland. Documenting his journey in 1679–1680, it offers a description of the landscape and the lifestyle of inhabitants of the region in the late 17th century.

The diary journals the travels of Danckaerts and Peter Sluyter (1645 in Wesel – 1722), two emissaries of Friesland pietists known as Labadists, journeying to North America to find a location for the establishment of a community. It is one of the earliest descriptions of the region that had been part of New Netherland, now New York, New Jersey and Delaware. Danckaerts and Sluyter eventually met Ephraim George Herman, the son of Augustine Herman, and he introduced them to his father in 1679. Initially Herman did not want to grant land to them, only permit their settlement, but in 1683, he conveyed a tract of 3,750 acres (15 km^{2}) to them because of legal issues. The group established a colony, with Peter Sluyter as the principal administrator, but it was not very successful, not growing larger than 100 people. The settlement ceased to exist after 1720.

The original Dutch manuscript was acquired in 1864 by Henry C. Murphy, then corresponding secretary of the Long Island Historical Society, in an old book-store in Amsterdam. Murphy published an English translation in 1867. A revised edition appeared as Original Narratives of Early American History, edited by J. B. Bartlett of the Maryland Historical Society and J. F. Jameson, director of the Department of Historical Research in the Carnegie Institutions of Washington in 1913.

Danckaert and Sluyter returned to Europe on July 23, 1680, and came back the same year with the people who would form the colony. Danckaert then went to the settlement of La Providence in Dutch Guiana, which lasted very briefly. In 1684 he became a citizen of Maryland, but soon returned to the Netherlands. Living most of the rest of his life in Wieuwerd, he died in Middelburg between 1702 and 1704.
