= Nora Thompson Dean =

American Lenape traditionalist and youth mentor (1907 – 1984)

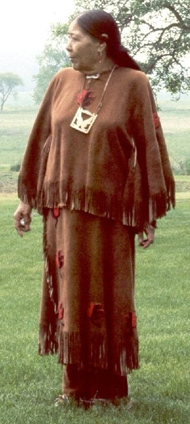
Dean in a buckskin dress on a visit to Pennsylvania, c. 1973

Nora Thompson Dean or Weènchipahkihëlèxkwe (July 3, 1907 – November 29, 1984) was a member of the Delaware Tribe of Indians from Dewey, Oklahoma. As a Lenape traditionalist and one of the last fluent speakers of the southern Unami dialect of the Lenape language, she was an influential mentor to younger tribal members and is widely cited in scholarship on Lenape (/luh-NAH-pay/) culture.

Nora was also known by her indigenous blessing name, Weènchipahkihëlèxkwe, ‘Touching Leaves Woman.’ The Unami (= /w’NAH-mee/ ‘downriver [person]’) name of Nora Thompson Dean and the genealogy of her ancestors is now readily accessible on the Internet after someone in 2008 adapted the spelling Wenjipahkeehlehkwe, intending it to be limited to one cultural event, but it spread widely on the Internet. Its modern spelling is Weènchipahkihëlèxkwe, ‘Touching Leaves Woman’, or, as Nora had proposed, ‘Leaves-that-touch-each-other-from-time-to-time woman.’ It is phonetically written as Weεnčipahkihəlεxkwe, /way-en-jee-paH-kee-hull-EKH-kway/. The morphological segments are as follows: (We:εnt-ipahk-ihəle:)-xkwe, ‘on.both.sides/on.either.side/together-leaves-moving–woman’. The initial stem shows a reciprocal reduplication, rare for Unami, (*we:we:- instead of wë-), ‘the leaves (of the trees) on either side (of the path) come together (overhead rustling)’. This is a blessing name that is derived from a vision recitation. Her name was bestowed on her by her mother, Sarah Wilson Thompson. The woman with whom Sarah Wilson was riding on a horse was not her biological mother but her aunt, Way-lay-luh-mah (‘the esteemed one’), as supplied by Weslager, and it was not Kweiti, Sarah's biological mother, but Way-lay-luh-mah who raised her and whom she called her mother, and so Nora called Way-lay-luh-mah her grandmother. This naming pattern is in line with Lenape kinship ideas. The vision occurred after Sarah was riding horseback one day holding onto Way-lay-luh-mah's waist when Way-lay-luh-mah had fainted from a probable heart attack. Sarah tried to hold her, but her grip slipped, and both had fallen off the horse. Sarah was very frightened, but some of the trees turned into people who told her not to be afraid and wanted to help her. Sarah stood listening, and the tree leaves by rustling started to sing a song to her, one that she sang in the Big House. (Note: Paraphrased by Carl Masthay per NTD's interview by Katherine Red Corn, April 1968, and compiled with help from Ives Goddard, Raymond Whritenour, and James Rementer.)

== Early life and education ==
Thompson was born in roughly ten miles east of Bartlesville, Oklahoma in Glen Oak, Oklahoma, on July 3, 1907, to James H. and Sarah (Wilson) Thompson, both full-blood Delawares. She received her education in Oklahoma's public schools. She graduated from Midway School in 1921, as salutatorian, and from Dewey High School in Dewey, Oklahoma, in 1925. Thompson also had some nursing training and several university credits.

In 1941, she married Charley Dean, who was also born and raised in northeastern Oklahoma.

== Cultural revitalization efforts ==
Dean was raised in the traditional ways of her people, and she dedicated herself to keeping these alive. Throughout her adult life, she taught about the Lenape religious ceremonies, social functions, dances, craftwork, herbal medicines, and language. She was consulted by tribal members and numerous academic specialists, including anthropologists, linguists, historians, botanists, and ethnomusicologists.

In 1967, Dean founded a mail-order business, Touching Leaves Indian Crafts, through which she sold the traditional clothing of the Lenape and other items. Dean received awards for her craftwork, and in recognition of her work to promote the traditional ways of her Lenape people. These included commendations from the Oklahoma House of Representatives and the Governors of Oklahoma, Delaware, and Pennsylvania, and a Fellowship Award from the Archaeological Society of New Jersey.

In 1972, Dean participated in the Delaware Indian Symposium, which brought together scholars and tribal members from Oklahoma and Canada. She also presented at another Delaware cultural gathering in 1981.

In the later part of her life, Dean divided her time between artwork, working with students who came to her home to study, lecturing at universities, working at museums demonstrating Lenape artwork, working at different universities as a resource person, and preparing educational material for sale through her business.

Oklahoma governor George Nigh declared Dean an Oklahoma Ambassador of Good Will.

The year after her death, Dean's husband donated seeds of Lenape Blue Corn to the U.S. Department of Agriculture, a variety of corn cultivated by the Lenape that was brought west by Dean's mother.

Dean created material including four Lenape Language Lessons; these sound recordings, as well as others made with Dean and other Lenape elders during the twentieth century, have been digitized to provide the voices of the Lenape Talking Dictionary, a project funded by the National Science Foundation. Dean's brother Edward Leonard Thompson (1904–2002) was the last living native speaker of Unami in the United States.

== Death ==
Dean died on November 29, 1984 and is buried in the Delaware Indian Cemetery in Dewey, Oklahoma.

== Selected bibliography ==
=== Works authored or co-authored by Nora Thompson Dean ===
- "Recipes of Indian Dishes." American Indian Crafts and Culture 7:8 (October 1973) 21.
- "A Personal Account of the Unami Delaware Big House Rite." Pennsylvania Archaeologist 48 (April 1978) 39–43. Co-authored by Jay Miller.
- "Delaware Indian Reminiscences." Bulletin of the Archaeological Society of New Jersey 35 (1978) 1–17.
- Lenape Language Lessons: Lessons One and Two. Dewey, OK: Touching Leaves Indian Crafts, 1979. (Tape and book.)
- Lenape Language Lessons: Lessons Three and Four. Dewey, OK: Touching Leaves Indian Crafts, 1980. (Tape and book.)
- Songs of the Lenape: Social Dance Songs, Tape 1, Dewey, OK: Touching Leaves Indian Crafts, 1980. (Tape and written insert.)
- Songs of the Lenape: War Dance and Social Dance, Tape 2, Dewey, OK: Touching Leaves Indian Crafts, 1982. (Tape and written insert)
- "A Baker's Dozen Do-Nots: Some Guidelines for Linguists, Anthropologists, and Their Related Tribal Members," Algonquian and Iroquoian Linguistics7:2 (1982)
- Touching Leaves Woman, "Some of the Ways of the Delaware Indian Women," in NOW Yellow Pages: A Feminist Guide to North Eastern Oklahoma, Bartlesville, Oklahoma, 1983. Also published in: Turtle Children: A Handbook for Delaware Children, Anadarko, OK: Delaware Tribe of Western Oklahoma, 1985.
- The Spiritual World of the Lenape or Delaware Indians, in Many Trails: Indians of the Lower Hudson Valley, Katonah, NY: The Katonah Gallery, 1983. (Exhibition catalog.)
- "Remembrances of the Big House Church," in Herbert C. Kraft, ed. The Lenape Indian: A Symposium. South Orange, NJ: Archaeological Research Center, Seton Hall University, 1984.
- "Lenape Funeral Customs," in Herbert C. Kraft, ed. The Lenape Indian: A Symposium. South Orange, NJ: Archaeological Research Center, Seton Hall University, 1984.
- Lenape Indian Cooking with Touching Leaves Woman, James Rementer, ed. Dewey, OK: Touching Leaves Indian Crafts, 1991.
- “Delaware Indian Religion: A Talk by Nora Thompson Dean.” James Rementer, ed. Bulletin of the Archaeological Society of New Jersey 50 (1995) 27–30.

=== Works for which Nora Thompson Dean was a consultant ===
- Adams, Richard C. Legends of the Delaware Indians and Picture Writing, ed. by Deborah Nichols, Syracuse University Press, 1997.
- Cranor, Ruby. Talking Tombstones. Bartlesville OK: R.A. Cranor, 1983.
- Cranor, Ruby. Caney Valley Ghost Towns and Settlements. Bartlesville, OK: R.A. Cranor, 1985.
- Goddard, Ives. Delaware Verbal Morphology: A Descriptive and Comparative Study. Garland Publishers, 1979
- Hilbert, Alfred G. "That Word 'Chemung' - What It Means" The Chemung Historical Journal 20: 3 (March, 1975)
- Hill Jr., George A. Delaware Ethnobotany Newsletter of the Oklahoma Anthropological Society (March 1971).
- Howard, James H. "The Nanticoke-Delaware Skeleton Dance." American Indian Quarterly, (Spring 1975) 1–13.
- Howard, James H. "Ceremonial Dress of the Delaware Man." Bulletin of the Archaeological Society of New Jersey, 1976
- Howard, James H. Shawnee! The Ceremonialism of a Native American Tribe and Its Cultural Background OH: Ohio University Press, 1981.
- Kraft, Herbert C. "Archaeological Evidence for a Possible Masking Complex among the Prehistoric Lenape in Northwestern New Jersey." Bulletin of the New York State Archaeological Association 56 (1972) 1–11.
- Kraft, Herbert C. ed. A Delaware Indian Symposium, PA: The Pennsylvania Historical and Museum Commission, 1974.
- Kraft, Herbert C. The Archaeology of the Tocks Island Area NJ: Seton Hall University Museum, 1975.
- Kraft, Herbert C. The Lenape: Archaeology, History, and Ethnography, Newark, NJ: New Jersey Historical Society, 1986.
- Kraft, Herbert C., and Kraft, John T. The Indians of Lenapehoking. NJ: Seton Hall University Museum, 1985.
- Lederer Jr. Richard M. The Place-Names of Westchester County in New York. Harrison NY: Harbor Hill Books, 1978.
- Masthay, Carl. ed. Schmick's Mahican Dictionary, Philadelphia, PA: American Philosophical Society, vol. 197, 1991.
- Miller, Jay. "Kwulakan: The Delaware Side of Their Movement West." Pennsylvania Archaeologist (December, 1975)
- Miller, Jay. "Delaware Alternative Classifications," Anthropological Linguistics, 17: 9 (December, 1975) 434–444.
- Miller, Jay. "Delaware Anatomy." Anthropological Linguistics 19:4 (April 1977) 144–166.
- Newcomb Jr., William W. "The Culture and Acculturation of the Delaware Indians," Anthropological Papers 10 Ann Arbor, University of Michigan, 1956.
- Oestreicher, David M. "Unmasking the Walam Olum: A 19th-Century Hoax." Bulletin #49 of the Archaeological Society of New Jersey, 1994.
- Pearson, Bruce L. "A Grammar of Delaware: Semantics, Morpho-Syntax, Lexicon, Phonology (dissertation)." (©1972 Bruce L. Pearson), Touching Leaves Co., 1988.
- Prewitt, Terry J. "Tradition and Culture Change in the Oklahoma Delaware Big House Community: 1867 - 1924" Contributions in Archaeology no. 9, University of Tulsa, 1981.
- Rementer, James A. "A Lenape Family Named Thompson." Bulletin #49 of the Archaeological Society of New Jersey, 1994.
- Stewart, Ty. "Oklahoma Delaware Women's Dance Clothing." American Indian Crafts and Culture Magazine (1973).
- Teague, Margaret W. History of Washington County and Surrounding Area, Bartlesville, OK: Bartlesville Historical Commission, 1967.
- Twaddle, Andrew C. and Hessler, Richard M. A Sociology of Health. The C. V. Mosby Co., 1977.
- University Forum: The Delaware Indians Then and Now, a two-part educational video featuring Nora Thompson Dean and Terry J. Prewitt, hosted by Fran Reingold, University of Tulsa, 1980
- Weslager, C.A. "Name-Giving among the Delaware Indians." Names, Journal of the American Name Society (December 1971).
- Weslager, C.A. The Delaware Indians: A History. New Brunswick: Rutgers University Press, 1972.
- Weslager, C.A. Magic Medicines of the Indians NJ: Middle Atlantic Press, 1973.
- Weslager, C.A. "The Wolf, Turkey, and Turtle." Delaware Conservationist, 18: 4 (Winter 1974) 75.
- Weslager, C.A. Red Men on the Brandywine, 2nd ed. Wilmington, DE: Delmar Agency, Inc., 1976.
- Weslager, C.A. "New Castle, Delaware - And Its Former Names." Names, the Journal of the American Name Society, June, 1976
- Weslager, C.A. The Delaware Indian Westward Migration. NJ: Middle Atlantic Press, 1978.
- Weslager, C.A. "Lenape Ethnology from William Penn's Relation of 1683." Bulletin of the Archaeological Society of Delaware18 New Series (1985)
- Williams, Joe. Bartlesville: Remembrances of Times Past, Reflections of Today. Bartlesville OK: TRW Reda Pump Division, 1978.
