= Charles Journeycake =

Lenape leader

Reverend Charles Journeycake
- Neshapanacumin
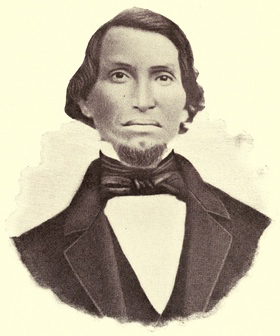
- Charles Journeycake, 1854
- Born: December 16, 1817; Upper Sandusky River, Ohio, US
- Died: January 3, 1894 (aged 76)
- Resting place: Nowata, Oklahoma, US
- Citizenship: Delaware Tribe of Indians
- Occupations: diplomat, chief, Baptist minister
- Years active: 1872–1894
- Era: Reservation Era
- Employer: American Baptists
- Children: Jane Sosha Journeycake
- Parents: Solomon Journeycake (father); Sally Williams (mother)

Charles Journeycake (December 16, 1817 – January 3, 1894) also known as Ne-sha-pa-na-cumin or Neshapanacumin, was a Native American chief and Baptist minister. He was Lenape and part of the Eastern Delaware.

He visited Washington, DC, 24 times on behalf of his people starting in 1854 and was the founder of Linwood, Kansas.

== Early life ==
Charles Journeycake was born near the Upper Sanducky River in Ohio on December 16, 1817. He belonged to the Wolf clan of the Delaware and was also of Wyandotte and French descent. His parents were Sally Williams (Wyandotte) and Solomon Journeycake (Delaware), a chief.

In 1828, Journeycake and his band were forced from Ohio into northeastern Kansas. They arrived on their Indian reservation in 1829. In 1833, he was baptized, and in 1872, he was ordained as a minister in the American Baptist Church.

He married Jane Sosha Journeycake.

== Diplomacy ==
Journeycake was a signatory of the 1854 treaties that ceded Lenape lands in the West, except their reservation land in Kansas. He also signed the allotment treaty of 1861 and the 1866 treaty for removal of the Eastern Delaware to Indian Territory, which became Oklahoma. These treaties were signed under duress, especially the 1866 treaty following the American Civil War, since whites were stealing from Delaware's farms. The Delaware had no legal recourse.

In 1867, his band of Eastern Delaware purchased land from the Cherokee Nation and settled there. His settled near Alluwe in present-day Nowata County, Oklahoma.

He supported Bacone College, a Native college founded by the Baptists in Muskogee, Oklahoma.

== Death ==
Journeycake's wife Jane died in 1893, and he died on January 3, 1894. His grave was moved to Nowata when his original burial place was flooded by the Oologah Dam.
