= Anna Lavinia Van Benschoten =

American mathematician (1886–1927)

- Born: August 12, 1866; Elmira, New York
- Died: September 18, 1927 (aged 61); Whittier, California
- Burial place: Binghamton, New York
- Education: Cornell University
- Occupations: Mathematician and university professor
- Employer(s): Binghamton Central High School, Wells College, Whittier College

Anna Lavinia Van Benschoten (August 12, 1866 – September 18, 1927) was an American mathematician and university professor. She was one of the few American women awarded a PhD in mathematics before World War II.

== Biography ==
Van Benschoten was born August 12, 1866 in Elmira, New York, the daughter of music teacher Mary Jane Pugsley and Moses M. Van Benschoten. She attended the Public School of Binghamton in Binghamton and left Binghamton Central High School in 1886, a year after her mother's death. From 1891 to 1894, she studied mathematics at Cornell University and, after receiving her bachelor's degree, taught at Binghamton Central High School until 1898. She spent the summers of 1897 and 1898 and the following two academic years at the University of Chicago, to earn her master's degree in mathematics and astronomy in 1900. With her master's in hand, she traveled to Europe and attended lectures in mathematics and astronomy at the University of Göttingen, including those given by Felix Klein. In doing so, she joined other female mathematics students from the United States who were studying the subject with Klein and others at the university.

In 1901, when Annie MacKinnon married, which forced her to vacate her position as professor at Wells College, a private women's college in Aurora, New York, Van Benschoten assumed that position and remained there until 1920. She was elected a member of the American Mathematical Society in 1903. In 1906, she returned to Cornell to continue her PhD studies under Virgil Snyder and received her doctorate in 1908 with the dissertation: The Birational Transformations of Algebraic Curves of Genus Four.

In 1918, she taught the "boys of the Student Army Corps" at the University of Arizona. During her lifetime, she traveled to Norway, Sweden, Russia, Germany, Alaska and Jamaica.

In 1921, she moved to Whittier, California, and lived with Amy J. Douglass but had to stop teaching due to her rheumatoid arthritis. She taught privately from January to April 1924 at Whittier College, when she was substituting for another faculty member.

Van Benschoten died at 61 on September 18, 1927, in Whittier, California. Her remains were interred in Binghamton, New York.

== Memberships ==
Organizational affiliations, according to Green.

- American Mathematical Society (AMS)
- Mathematical Association of America (MAA) - charter member
- Kappa Kappa Gamma
