= Peach War =

1655 North American conflict

- Part of the American Indian Wars
- The borders of New Netherland and New Sweden in 1650
Date	September 15, 1655
Location	New Amsterdam, Staten Island, and Pavonia, New Netherland
Result	Munsee victory

Belligerents
Munsee	New Netherland

Commanders and leaders
Unknown	(Dutch Republic) Peter Stuyvesant (Dutch Republic) Cornelis van Tienhoven

Strength
500; 64 war canoes	Unknown

Casualties and losses
At least 3 killed	43 killed 100 captured

The Peach War, sometimes called the Peach Tree War, was a one-day occupation of New Amsterdam on September 15, 1655, by several hundred Munsee, followed by raids on Staten Island and Pavonia (today's Jersey City). Forty-three colonists were killed and over 100, mostly women and children, were taken captive, but released later.

The cause of the Peach War has been the subject of debate. The armed protest and raids may have been triggered by the murder of a Munsee woman who was stealing peaches from the orchard of Dutch colonist Hendrick van Dyck. Some writers, however, have speculated that the Peach War was orchestrated by the Susquehannock in response to the Dutch conquest of New Sweden.

== Background ==
New Amsterdam was established on Manhattan by the Dutch West India Company in 1624. The surrounding area was occupied by various Munsee bands including the Wappinger, Hackensack, Raritan, Navesink, and Tappan. The relationship between the Dutch and the Munsee was often strained particularly in the aftermath of Kieft's War.

In 1655, the Dutch West India Company ordered Director-General Peter Stuyvesant to conquer the colony of New Sweden. New Sweden had been established on the Delaware River in 1638 in territory claimed by the Dutch and had developed a close trading relationship with the Susquehannock who inhabited the lower Susquehanna River valley. In late August 1655, Stuyvesant with seven armed vessels and 317 soldiers sailed from New Amsterdam for Delaware Bay. On September 15, 1655, Governor Johan Risingh surrendered Fort Christina and the colony without a fight.

== Occupation and attacks ==
At daybreak on September 15, 1655, about 500 Munsee in 64 canoes landed near the southern end of Manhattan. They proceeded to break down doors, ransack houses, and threaten or beat some of the occupants, although no deaths or serious injuries occurred. The sachems met with members of the colony's governing council at Fort Amsterdam and agreed to withdraw at sunset. Meanwhile, the councilors called the citizens to arms and a guard was mounted. As the Munsee gathered at the riverbank to depart, Hendrick van Dyck was shot and wounded by an arrow. In response, New Netherland's fiscal, Cornelis van Tienhoven, urged the guard to open fire. In the ensuing skirmish, three Munsee and three colonists were killed.

One group of Munsee then crossed the Hudson River and attacked Pavonia while a second group raided Staten Island. Stuyvesant later reported that in the attacks "40 Christians" were killed and 100, mostly women and children, taken captive. He further reported that 28 farms had been destroyed, 12,000 skipples (9,000 bushels) of grain burned, and 500 head of cattle taken or killed. There were also ransacking of farms in Harlem and the Bronx, including Colen Donck.

== Cause ==
Based on the reports of Stuyvesant, van Tienhoven, and members of the governing council, the directors of the Dutch West India Company concluded that the occupation of New Amsterdam was prompted by Hendrick van Dyck's murder of the Munsee woman he caught picking peaches in his orchard. The attacks on Pavonia and Staten Island were blamed on the actions of Cornelis van Tienhoven on the evening of the 15th: "Whoever considers only his last transaction with the savages, will find that with clouded brains, filled with liquor, he was a prime cause of this dreadful massacre."

A number of historians have speculated that the Susquehannock were behind the armed protest. In a letter to Stuyvesant, the governing council reported the presence of a Minqua (Susquehannock) sachem during the riot. Because of their close relationship with the Swedes, the Susquehannock are thought to have encouraged the Munsee to occupy New Amsterdam to force Stuyvesant to abandon his attack on New Sweden. While the Peach War is often described as a retaliatory attack on New Amsterdam, no blood was spilled until the evening of the 15th. University of Iowa historian Tom Arne Midtrød observed: "If the Natives meant to launch a military attack on New Amsterdam, they could have done far more damage." American historian Allan Trelease, however, noted that direct action on the Delaware by the Susquehannock would have been more to the point.

== Aftermath ==
The Hackensack began releasing their captives in October with other Munsee bands following suit. During negotiations for the release of captives, Captain Adrian Post repeatedly traveled between New Amsterdam and the Hackensack encampment at Paulus Hook. By October 21, 1655, 56 captives had been released in exchange for powder, lead, guns, blankets, and wampum. Further negotiations secured the release of almost all other prisoners. A year later Stuyvesant was able to report that only two or three children had not been returned to their families.

The nascent colony of Cornelis Melyn on Staten Island was abandoned. Stuyvesant repurchased the right to settle the area between the Hudson and Hackensack rivers (present-day Hudson County, New Jersey from the Lenape and established the fortified hamlet of Bergen (at today's Bergen Square in Jersey City), and required blockhouses to be established there and other outlying towns.

Stuyvesant was strongly opposed to taking military action against the Munsee. The director-general ordered that new settlements include a blockhouse for defense, that alcohol not be to given to Indigenous people nor their muskets repaired, and that trade be restricted to a single location. Van Tienhoven disagreed with Stuyvesant's approach arguing that it was "just and lawful to undertake war" against the Munsee.

In 1656, the Dutch West India Company ordered Cornelis van Tienhoven relieved of his post as fiscal due to "manifold complaints" and allegations of fraud. Several months later his hat and cane were found floating in the Hudson River although it is not known if he drowned or absconded.
