= Helen Brewster Owens =

American mathematician

- Born: April 2, 1881; Pleasanton, Kansas, US
- Died: June 6, 1968 (aged 87); Martinsburg, West Virginia, US
- Education: University of Kansas; Cornell University
- Scientific career
- Fields: Mathematics; Women's suffrage
- Workplaces: Wells College; Cornell University; Pennsylvania State University
- Doctoral advisor: Virgil Snyder

Helen Brewster Owens (April 2, 1881 – June 6, 1968) was an American suffragist and mathematician.

== Early life and education ==
Helen Brewster Owens was born April 2, 1881, in Pleasanton, Kansas, to Clara (née Linton) and Robert Edward Brewster. Her mother, who was a teacher and president of the Lincoln County Women's Suffrage Association, prompted Brewster's interest in the movement from a young age. As a girl, she attended the 1893 County Fair with her mother where she helped distribute flyers of Frances Willard.

Brewster Owens received a B.A. degree in mathematics from the University of Kansas in 1900 and her master's degree one year later from the same institution. Her master's thesis was titled "Collineations of Space which Leave Invariant a Quadric Surface," and it built off of the work of Ruth G. Wood, a groundbreaking woman in mathematics in her own right. She continued her graduate studies at the University of Chicago, but she and her family moved to Ithaca, New York, before she could complete a PhD. She finally received her doctorate in mathematics in 1910 at the age of 29 from Cornell University, advised by Virgil Snyder.

== Mathematical career ==
Brewster Owens taught math at the University Preparatory School in Ithaca, New York, from 1910 to 1912. In 1914, she was hired as an assistant professor of mathematics at Wells College in Aurora, New York. Next, she served as a mathematics instructor at Cornell University from 1917 to 1920. After several more interruptions to her profession due to moves for her husband's career, she reached the next stepping stone in her career when she was appointed an associate editor of the American Mathematical Monthly. In 1936, Brewster Owens began a major research project on the history of women in mathematics. From 1941–1949, she taught at Penn State University as an assistant professor.

== Suffrage activism ==
Brewster Owens kept up her suffrage career from that first visit to the 1893 County Fair with her mother throughout her life. In 1910, she was elected to the board of the Resolutions Committee of the New York State Woman Suffrage Association. In 1911, she returned to Kansas for a spell to continue the fight for suffrage there. Soon after, Anna Howard Shaw, president of the National American Woman's Suffrage Association asked Brewster Owens to return to Kansas as her personal representative. Working there throughout 1912, Brewster Owens bore witness to the state's ratification of the suffrage amendment - by 16,000 votes, the greatest majority of any state up until that point. She then returned to New York to fight for suffrage there.

== Personal life ==
Brewster Owens married her classmate, Frederick William Owens, in 1904. She gave birth to her first daughter, Helen, upon their move to Chicago one year later. She died on June 6, 1968, in Martinsburg, West Virginia.
