= Edward French =

Edward French may refer to:

- Gerald French (Edward Gerald Fleming French, 1883–1970), English cricketer
- Edward French (professor), lawyer, civil war veteran, professor at Wells College, and pioneer to California
- Edward French (bishop) (died 1810), Irish Roman Catholic clergyman; Bishop of Elphin, 1787–1810
- Edward French (make-up artist) (born 1951, also known as Ed French), American make-up artist
- Edward L. French (1860–1947), American politician
- Edward Lee French (1857–1916), English-born officer in the Indian Police Force
- Ed French, actor in the film Blood Rage
