= Emil Carl Wilm =

American philosopher

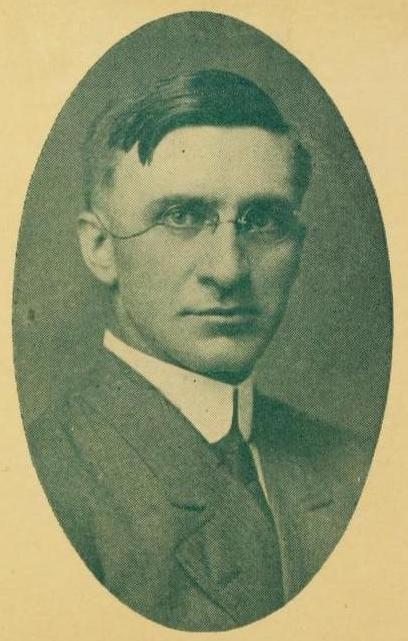
Wilm in the cover photograph of The Problem of Religion (1912).

Emil Carl Kunibert Wilm (1877 – January 31, 1932) was an American philosopher. His published scholarship, often written for a popular audience, was mainly in the history of philosophy and psychology.

== Early life and education ==
Wilm was born in 1877 in Margonin, then part of Prussia and now in Poland. He moved to the United States in 1890, at age 13. He received a bachelor of arts from Southwestern University in 1902, a master of arts from Vanderbilt University in 1903, and a PhD from Cornell University in 1905.

== Academic career ==
From 1905 to 1911, Wilm was a professor of philosophy at Washburn College; from 1911 to 1912 he was an assistant and docent in philosophy at Harvard University and Radcliffe College; and from 1912 to 1914 he was a professor of philosophy and education at Wells College. In 1912, while working as an assistant professor at Harvard, Wilm gave a lecture series on Henri Bergson. In the 1914–15 academic year, he was a lecturer at Bryn Mawr College.

Wilm taught philosophy as the Borden P. Bowne Chair at Boston University from 1915 to 1926, when he moved to Colorado College. As of his death, he taught philosophy and psychology at Stanford University and lectured at the College of the Pacific.

Wilm died on January 31, 1932, in California.

== Writing ==
Wilm's The Philosophy of Schiller in Its Historical Relations (1912), examined the thought of German philosopher Friedrich Schiller. The book considers the historical development of Schiller's thought and argues that it was the product of numerous, conflicting tendencies. In particular, it discusses German idealism and the influence of Immanuel Kant on Schiller. W. D. Zinnecker, in a review for The Philosophical Review, called The Philosophy of Schiller "an appreciative and fairly comprehensive study of Schiller's philosophical thinking".

The Problem of Religion, also published in 1912, is a general survey of the connections between philosophy and religion, covering topics such as the problem of evil. A reviewer for The Philosophical Review was unimpressed with Wilm's efforts in the book: "Professor Wilm's book can scarcely be regarded as a contribution or even as a summary of the work at present being done in the field of religious inquiry, yet it represents perhaps the most widespread of religious attitudes." Henri Bergson: A Study in Radical Evolution (1914) is a breezy study of Henri Bergson intended for a popular audience, with particular emphasis on Bergson's religious thought (of which Wilm approved) and metaphysics (of which he did not).

The Theories of Instinct (1925) is a wide-ranging monograph that synthesizes thinking on instinct from the pre-Socratics, to Descartes, to Darwin. It devotes particular attention to the mind–body problem.

== Publications ==
=== Monographs ===
- The Philosophy of Schiller in Its Historical Relations. Boston: John W. Luce and Company. 1912.
- The Problem of Religion. Boston; New York: The Pilgrim Press. 1912. ISBN 978-0-7905-9764-5. OCLC 1050789078.
- Henri Bergson: A Study in Radical Evolution. New York: Sturgis & Walton. 1914. OCLC 1046041295.
- Klemm, Otto (1914). A History of Psychology. Translated by Wilm, Emil Carl; Pintner, Rudolf. New York; Chicago: Charles Scribner's Sons. OCLC 1046518955.
- Religion and the School. New York; Cincinnati: Abingdon Press. 1918. OCLC 1052547937.
- The Theories of Instinct: A Study in the History of Psychology. New Haven, Connecticut: Yale University Press. 1925. OCLC 881360737.

=== Articles and chapters ===
- Wilm, E. C. (1908). "The Kantian Studies of Schiller". Journal of English and Germanic Philology. 7 (2): 126–133. ISSN 0363-6941. JSTOR 27699920.
- Wilm, E. C. (1913). "Bergson and the Philosophy of Religion". The Biblical World. 42 (5): 279–283. doi:10.1086/474922. ISSN 0190-3578. JSTOR 3142132. S2CID 145129142.
- Wilm, Emil Carl (1914). "The Religious Life of the High School Student". In Johnston, Charles Hughes (ed.). The Modern High School: Its Administration and Extension. New York; Chicago: Charles Scribner's Sons. pp. 736–759. OCLC 1049665221.
