= Henry B. Phillips =

American mathematician (1881–1973)

Henry Bayard Phillips (September 27, 1881 – 1973), often cited as H. B. Phillips, was an American mathematician.

== Career ==
Phillips studied at Erskine College, receiving his bachelor's degree in 1900, and earned his PhD in 1905 from Johns Hopkins University under Frank Morley with the dissertation Some Invariants and Covariants of Ternary Collineations. From 1905 to 1907 he was an instructor at the University of Cincinnati, then joined the Massachusetts Institute of Technology as an instructor, where he was promoted to professor in 1915. He served as head of the mathematics department from 1934 to 1947 and became emeritus in 1947.

Phillips co-authored work on vector analysis with C. L. E. Moore and published several textbooks on calculus and geometry. With Norbert Wiener, he published on numerical solutions of partial differential equations.

Phillips received an honorary doctorate (LL.D.) in 1939. He was elected a Fellow of the American Academy of Arts and Sciences in 1918.

In 1929 he married Charlotte T. Perry.

== Selected works ==
=== Papers ===
- Moore, C. L. E.; Phillips, H. B. (1918). "The Dyadics Which Occur in a Point Space of Three Dimensions". Proceedings of the American Academy of Arts and Sciences. 53 (5): 387–438. JSTOR 20025652.
- Phillips, H. B.; Wiener, Norbert (1923). "Nets and the Dirichlet problem". Journal of Mathematical Physics. 2: 105. doi:10.1002/SAPM192321105.

=== Books ===
- Analytic Geometry. Wiley, 1915.
- Differential Calculus. Wiley, 1916.
- Differential Equations. Wiley, 1916 (revised edition 1922).
- Integral Calculus. Wiley, 1917.
- Vector Analysis. Wiley, 1933 (revised edition 1947).
- Analytic Geometry and Calculus. Addison-Wesley, 1942.

=== Essays ===
- Phillips, H. B. (October 1945). "On the Nature of Progress". American Scientist. 33 (4): 253–259. JSTOR 27826083.
