= Margaret Reesor =

Classicist

Margaret E. Reesor

Academic background
- Education: Bryn Mawr College
- Thesis: The political theory of the old and middle Stoa (1951)

Margaret Elaine Reesor (3 May 1924 - 21 January 2010) was a classics professor who is known for her work on pre-Socratic, Stoic, and Epicurean philosophers.

== Early life ==
Reesor was born on May 3, 1924 in Toronto, Canada.

== Career ==
Reesor received her B.A. and M.A. from the University of Toronto in 1945 and 1946 respectively, and was awarded her Ph.D. from Bryn Mawr College in 1951. From 1950 to 1953 she worked as instructor in classics at Wells College. She then worked in the Woman's College at the University of North Carolina from 1954 to 1958, before joining the University of North Carolina at Chapel Hill until 1960. Reesor then became the first woman to teach at the University of Kentucky, remaining there until 1961. From 1961 until 1987 she worked at Queen's University, Ontario, acting as a lecturer. She also worked as a visiting fellow at Princeton University from 1973 to 1974 and from 1980 to 1981.

== Death ==
Reesor died on the 21 January 2010, in Kingston, Canada.

== Selected publications ==
- Reesor, Margaret E. (1951). The political theory of the old and middle Stoa. New York: J.J Augustin. OCLC 360247.
- Reesor, Margaret E. (1951). "The "Indifferents" in the Old and Middle Stoa". Transactions and Proceedings of the American Philological Association. 82: 102–110. doi:10.2307/283423. JSTOR 283423.
- Reesor, Margaret E. (1954). "The Stoic Concept of Quality". The American Journal of Philology. 75 (1): 40–58. doi:10.2307/291904. JSTOR 291904.
- Reesor, Margaret E. (1965). "Fate and Possibility in Early Stoic Philosophy". Phoenix. 19 (4): 285–297. doi:10.2307/1085828. JSTOR 1085828.
- Reesor, Margaret E. (1989). The Nature of Man in Early Stoic Philosophy. London: Bloomsbury Academic. ISBN 978-0-7156-2256-8.
