= Temple Rice Hollcroft =

American mathematician (1889–1967)

Temple Rice Hollcroft, Sr. (8 April 1889, Alton, Indiana – 1967) was an American mathematician and local historian.

Hollcroft received B.S. in 1912 and A.B. in 1914 from Hanover College and then A.M. in 1915 from the University of Kentucky. He received in 1917 his Ph.D. from Cornell University under Virgil Snyder and during WW I served in France as a second lieutenant in the Field Artillery. Hollcroft was a mathematics professor at Wells College from 1918 to 1954, when he retired as professor emeritus. He served for 14 years as associate secretary of the American Mathematical Society. In 1932 in Zurich he was an Invited Speaker of the ICM, with talk The general web of surfaces and the space involution defined by it.

The Temple Rice Hollcroft Collection at Wells College contains documents related to the history of Wells College, Henry Wells, Edwin B. Morgan, Wells Fargo, and American Express. The collection also contains some Alonzo Delano papers, Henry Warner Slocum autograph letters, and miscellaneous documents related to the history of Cayuga County, New York.

== Selected publications ==
- Singularities of curves of given order. Bull. Amer. Math. Soc. 29 (1923) 407–414. doi:10.1090/S0002-9904-1923-03765-8
- Limits for actual double points of space curves. Bull. Amer. Math. Soc. 31 (1925) 42–55. doi:10.1090/S0002-9904-1925-03997-X
- Singularities of the Hessian. Bull. Amer. Math. Soc. 33 (1927) 90–96. doi:10.1090/S0002-9904-1927-04320-8
- Multiple points of algebraic curves. Bull. Amer. Math. Soc. 35 (1929) 841–849. doi:10.1090/S0002-9904-1929-04802-X
- Invariant postulation. Bull. Amer. Math. Soc. 36 (1930) 421–426. doi:10.1090/S0002-9904-1930-04964-2
- The bitangential curve. Bull. Amer. Math. Soc. 37 (1931) 82–84. doi:10.1090/S0002-9904-1931-05107-7
- The general web of algebraic surfaces of order n and the involution defined by it. Trans. Amer. Math. Soc. 35 (1933) 855–868. doi:10.1090/S0002-9947-1933-1501719-4
- Characteristics of multiple curves and their residuals. Bull. Amer. Math. Soc. 39 (1933) 959–961. doi:10.1090/S0002-9904-1933-05783-X
- The web of quadric hypersurfaces in r dimensions. Bull. Amer. Math. Soc. 41 (1935) 97–103. doi:10.1090/S0002-9904-1935-06022-7
- The web of quadrics. Bull. Amer. Math. Soc. 42 (1936) 937–944. doi:10.1090/S0002-9904-1936-06473-6
- The Binet of quadrics in S_{3}. Trans. Amer. Math. Soc. 42 (1937) 32–40. doi:10.2307/1989673
- Branch-point manifolds associated with a linear system of primals. Bull. Amer. Math. Soc. 43 (1937) 379–383. doi:10.1090/S0002-9904-1937-06555-4
- The existence of algebraic plane curves. Bull. Amer. Math. Soc. 43 (1937) 503–521. doi:10.1090/S0002-9904-1937-06584-0
- The maximum number of distinct contacts of two algebraic surfaces. Bull. Amer. Math. Soc. 45 (1939) 158–163. doi:10.1090/S0002-9904-1939-06929-2
- Anomalous plane curve systems associated with singular surfaces. Bull. Amer. Math. Soc. 46 (1940) 252–257. doi:10.1090/S0002-9904-1940-07182-4
