= Virginia Jones =

Virginia Jones may refer to:

- Virginia Lacy Jones (1912–1984), American librarian
- Virginia Clara Jones (1920–2005), American actress better known by her stage name, Virginia Mayo
