= Annie MacKinnon =

American mathematician (1868–1940)

Annie Louise MacKinnon Fitch (June 1, 1868 – September 12, 1940) was a Canadian-born American mathematician who worked with Felix Klein and became a professor of mathematics at Wells College. She was the third woman to earn a mathematics doctorate at an American university.

== Early life and education ==
Annie Louise MacKinnon was born June 1, 1868, in Woodstock, Ontario; her parents were also both originally from Ontario. She moved with her family as an infant to Concordia, Kansas, where her father worked as a realtor and hardware salesman. After graduating from Concordia High School, she became a student at the University of Kansas, which had been coeducational since it was founded in 1866. She graduated in 1889, and remained at the University of Kansas for graduate study in mathematics, becoming the third mathematics graduate student at the university and the first woman. She earned a master's degree in 1891, remaining one more year at the university to work there with Henry Byron Newson.

In 1892, MacKinnon transferred to Cornell University. She finished her doctorate there in 1894, supported as an Erastus Brooks fellow. Her dissertation, Concomitant Binary Forms in Terms of the Roots, was supervised by James Edward Oliver, and also thanked James McMahon as a faculty mentor. This made her the third woman to earn a mathematics doctorate at an American university, following Winifred Edgerton Merrill in 1886 at Columbia University in 1886 and Ida Martha Metcalf at Cornell in 1893.

From 1894 to 1896 she continued to study mathematics at the University of Göttingen, working there with Felix Klein, supported in the first year by the Association of Collegiate Alumnae European Fellowship and in the second year by the Women's Education Association of Boston European Fellowship.

== Career and later life ==
MacKinnon taught high school mathematics in Lawrence, Kansas from 1890 to 1892. After her return from Europe in 1896, she became professor of mathematics at Wells College, a women's college in Aurora, New York; she was the only mathematician on the faculty. She also served as registrar for the college for 1900–1901.

In 1901, MacKinnon married Edward Fitch, an American classics scholar who had been at Göttingen at roughly the same time as MacKinnon, and later taught at Hamilton College. After marrying, she gave up her mathematical career.

She died on September 12, 1940, in Clinton, New York. A scholarship in mathematics at Hamilton College was established in her name by her husband.
