= Sisam (disambiguation) =

Sisam is the Ottoman Turkish name for the island of Samos, Greece.

Sisam may also refer to:

- Ainu word for a Japanese person
- Sisam hypothesis on royal genealogies
- Syresham, UK village from which the English name Sisam is derived

== People with the surname Sisam ==
- Charles Herschel Sisam (1879–1964), an American mathematician
- Kenneth Sisam (1887-1971), a New Zealand academic and publisher
