= Milicent Hathaway =

American nutritionist

Milicent Louise Hathaway
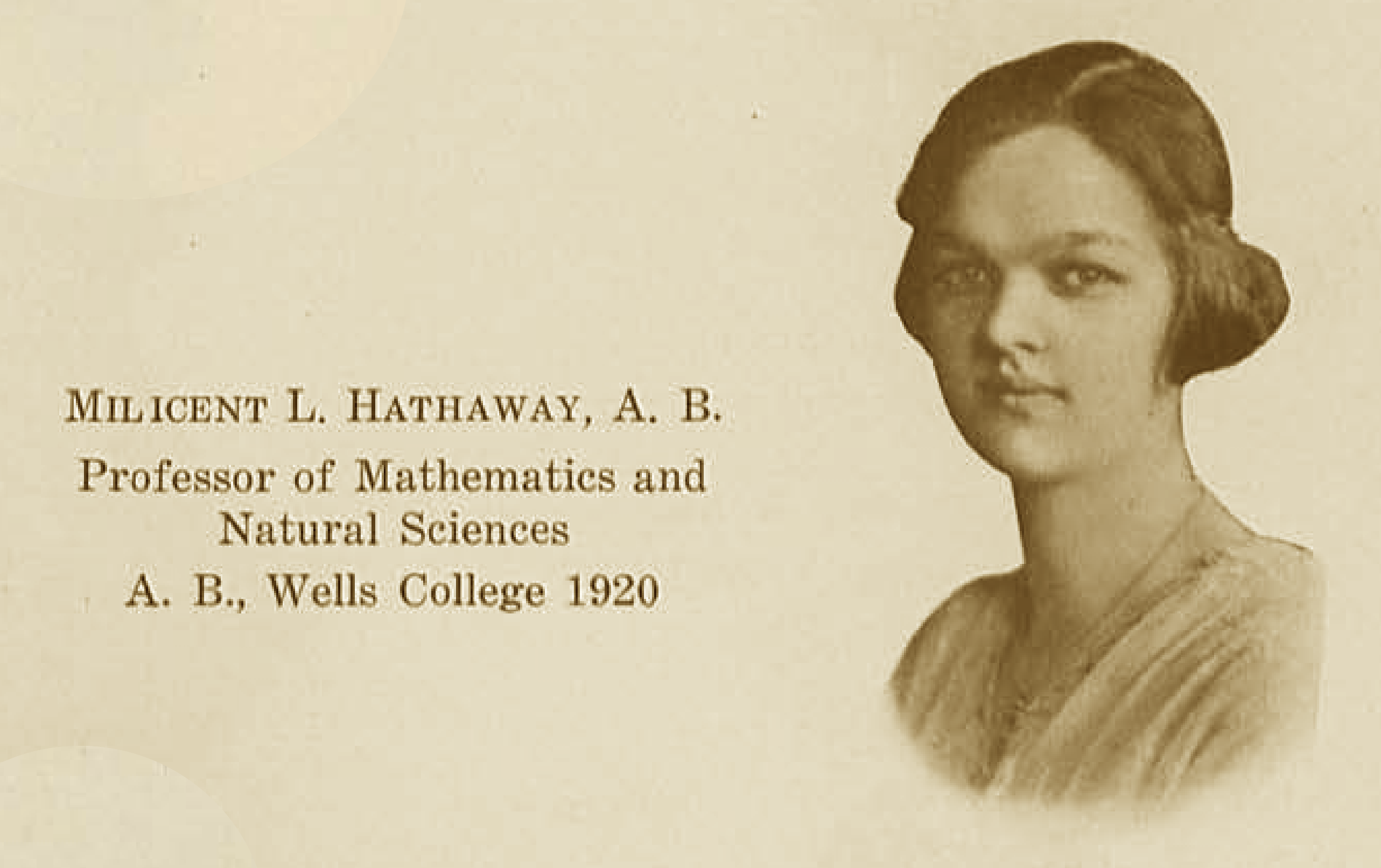
- Cedarville University, Fall 1921
- Born: 1898
- Died: 1974 (aged 75–76)
- Education: Wells College A.B., 1920 University of Buffalo A.M., 1920 University of Chicago Ph.D., 1932
- Occupations: Nutritionist and physiological chemist

Milicent Louise Hathaway (1898–1974) was an American nutritionist and physiological chemist best known for her research on human metabolism. She taught at several colleges from 1930 to 1966 and worked for the U.S. Department of Agriculture in the postwar period.

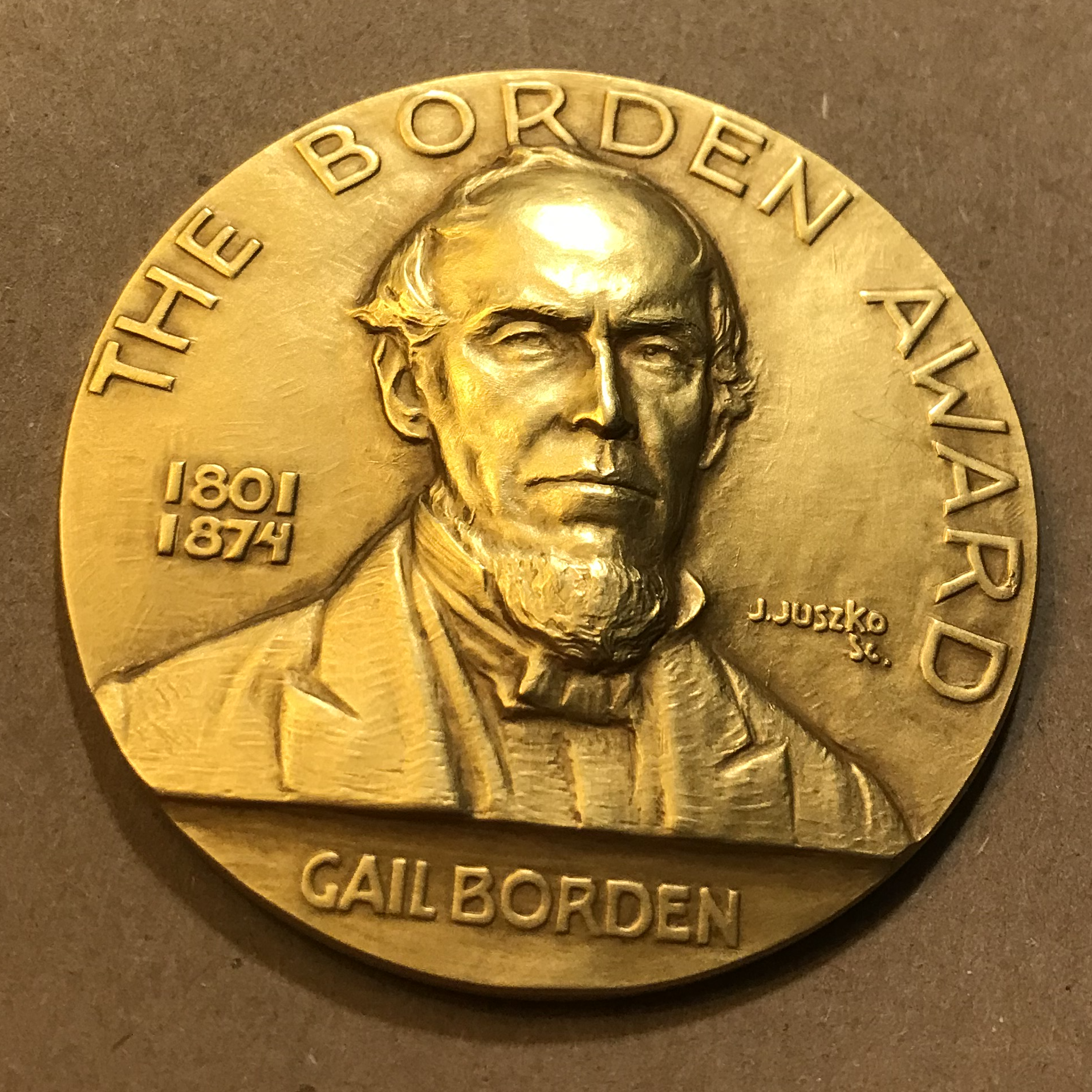
The Borden Award

== Biography ==
Hathaway earned her A.B. from Wells College in 1920 and an A.M. in chemistry from the University of Buffalo in the same year. She then taught science and mathematics at several high schools before returning to school in 1931 to study biochemistry at the University of Chicago. After earning her Ph.D., she taught as an instructor in the chemistry department before moving on to the College of Medicine of the University of Illinois. She taught home economics there before moving on to Cornell University. After the Second World War, she took a job as a nutrition specialist at the U.S. Department of Agriculture. She ended her career teaching home economics at Howard University from 1962 to 1966.

She is the author or co-author of more than twenty-five technical publications and papers and was the recipient of the Borden Award, given by the American Association of Home Economics in 1947. [American Association of Family and Consumer Sciences (AAFCS), Home Economics]

A member of numerous professional societies, her name has also been listed in Who's Who of American Women and in American Men of Science.

== Published works ==
Hathaway, Milicent Louise, Provitamin D Potencies, Absorption Spectra, and Chemical Studies of Heat-Treated Cholesterol. Baltimore, 1935, Ph.D. dissertation.

Hathaway, Milicent Louise, Heights and Weights of Children and Youth in the United States. Washington, D.C.: Institute of Home Economics, U.S. Agricultural Research Services, U.S. Government Printing Office, 1957.

Milicent L. Hathaway, Frieda L. Meyer, and Sadye F. Adelson “School Lunches: Their Nutritive Value and Relation to the Health and Diet of Children”, 40, no. 9 (September 1, 1950): pp. 1096-1100. https://doi.org/10.2105/AJPH.40.9.1096 PMID 15432800

Further Studies on the Calcium Requirement of Preschool Children: Two Figures Dorothy Sheldon McLean, Gladys Kinsman Lewis, Elizabeth Jensen, Milicent Hathaway, Herta Breiter, Julia Outhouse Holmes The Journal of Nutrition, Volume 31, Issue 1, January 1946, Pages 127–140, https://doi.org/10.1093/jn/31.1.127
