= Lynne Huffer =

- Born: 1960 (age 65–66)
- Education: University of Michigan
- Awards: Modern Languages Association Florence Howe Award for feminist scholarship in English (2011)
- Scientific career
- Fields: Queer theory and Foucault
- Workplaces: Emory University
- Website: Official website

Lynne Huffer (born 1960) is Samuel Candler Dobbs Professor of Philosophy at Emory University and widely known for her work on queer theory and Foucault. In her career at Yale, Rice, and Emory Universities, she has won numerous awards, including four major teaching prizes at Emory and Rice Universities, as well as the Modern Languages Association Florence Howe Award for feminist scholarship in English (2011). Huffer is also co-editor, with Shannon Winnubst, of philoSOPHIA: A Journal of Continental Feminism.

== Education and career ==
Huffer began her studies at Wells College in 1978 and then moved to Ohio University, where she graduated in 1984 with high honors in French Literature. At the University of Michigan, Ann Arbor, she received a master's degree in French literature in 1985, and a Ph.D. in French Literature with a certificate in women's studies in 1989.

Huffer taught at Yale University from 1989 to 1998 and Rice University, at the rank of full professor, from 1998 to 2005. She joined the faculty at Emory University in 2005 and was awarded the Samuel Candler Dobbs Professorship in 2012. In addition to her appointment in the department of Women's, Gender, and Sexuality Studies, she is affiliated faculty in philosophy.

== Research areas and publications ==
Huffer is the author of four books and numerous articles and chapters. Summarizing her two most recent books, one reviewer wrote, "In Are the Lips a Grave Lynne Huffer brings together her work in feminist and queer theory to continue the project that she began in her previous book, Mad for Foucault—the rethinking of the foundations of queer, and now feminist, theory in order to develop a relational ethics, which she sums up as “an erotic, desubjectivating practice of freedom in relation to others.” In addition to Are the Lips a Grave? (2013) and Mad for Foucault (2010), she has written Maternal Pasts, Feminist Futures (1998); and Another Colette (1992); and numerous articles on feminist theory, queer theory, French literature, and ethics.

Huffer has also written personal essays and creative nonfiction which have been or are appeared or are forthcoming in Wild Iris Review, Blue Lake Review, Forge, Cadillac Cicatrix, Dos Passos Review, Eleven Eleven, Passager, The Rambler, Rio Grande Review, Southern California Review, Sou'wester, and Talking River Review.

== Political activism ==
Following the 2016 US Presidential election, Huffer became involved in the Sanctuary Movement, calling for Emory University to become a sanctuary campus.
