= Cassius Milton Wicker =

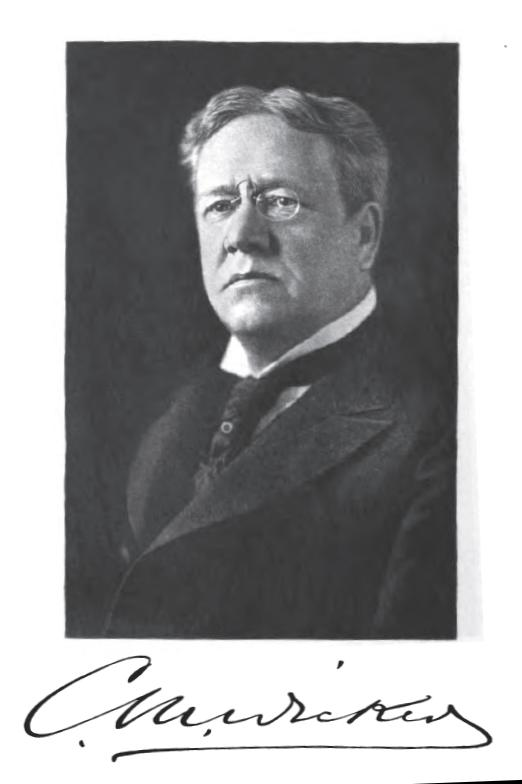
Cassius Milton Wicker

Cassius Milton Wicker (August 25, 1844 – November 2, 1913) was a railroad manager and banker.

== The Railroads ==
Wicker began his railroad career at twenty-one as a check clerk for the Star-Union Line in East St. Louis, moving up to cashier for the People's Dispatch, Chinese emigrant agent for the North Missouri Railway, and assistant general freight agent for the North Missouri Railway. In 1871 he became assistant general freight agent for the Chicago and North Western Railway, where he had the duty of settling the claims for the losses in the Great Chicago Fire of 1871.

In 1876 he moved to the Baltimore and Ohio Railroad as a general agent, assistant general freight agent, traffic manager for the Trans-Ohio division, mining manager in Northern Michigan, and general manager of the B&O's Illinois coal mines. In 1882 he became a commissioner for the Chicago Freight Bureau. In 1887 he was named vice-president of the Colorado Eastern Railway and in 1889 president of the Zanesville and Ohio River Railway. Concurrently he was also a vice-president of the Fort Worth and Rio Grande Railway, the Brooklyn, Queens County and Suburban Railroad, president of the Hudson Valley Railway, the Denver Railroad, Land and Coal Company, the Dillon-Griswold Wire Company, and president of North Shore Traction Company (which owned the Lynn and Boston Railway and controlling stocks in many others).

== The Banks ==
Wicker was also a trustee and vice-president at the Washington Savings Bank, chairman of the board of the Bank of Discount, president of the Bankers' Money Association, and director of Aetna.

== Personal life ==
Wicker was born August 25, 1846, the son of Cyrus Washburn Wicker and Maria Delight (née Halladay) in North Ferrisburgh, Vermont. He was educated in the "little red school house" at North Ferrisburg and at the Williston and Middlebury Academies. Three of his ancestor were on the Mayflower: William Latham, Elder Brewster, and Mary Chilton. On June 5, 1872, he married Augusta Carroll French (1849–1889) the daughter of former Illinois Governor Augustus C. French becoming the brother-in-law of Edward French and the uncle to poet Nora May French. They had three children Henry Halladay Wicker, Lucy Southworth Wicker, and Cyrus French Wicker. Cassius M. Wicker died in 1913.
