= Myra Reynolds =

American literary scholar (1853–1936)

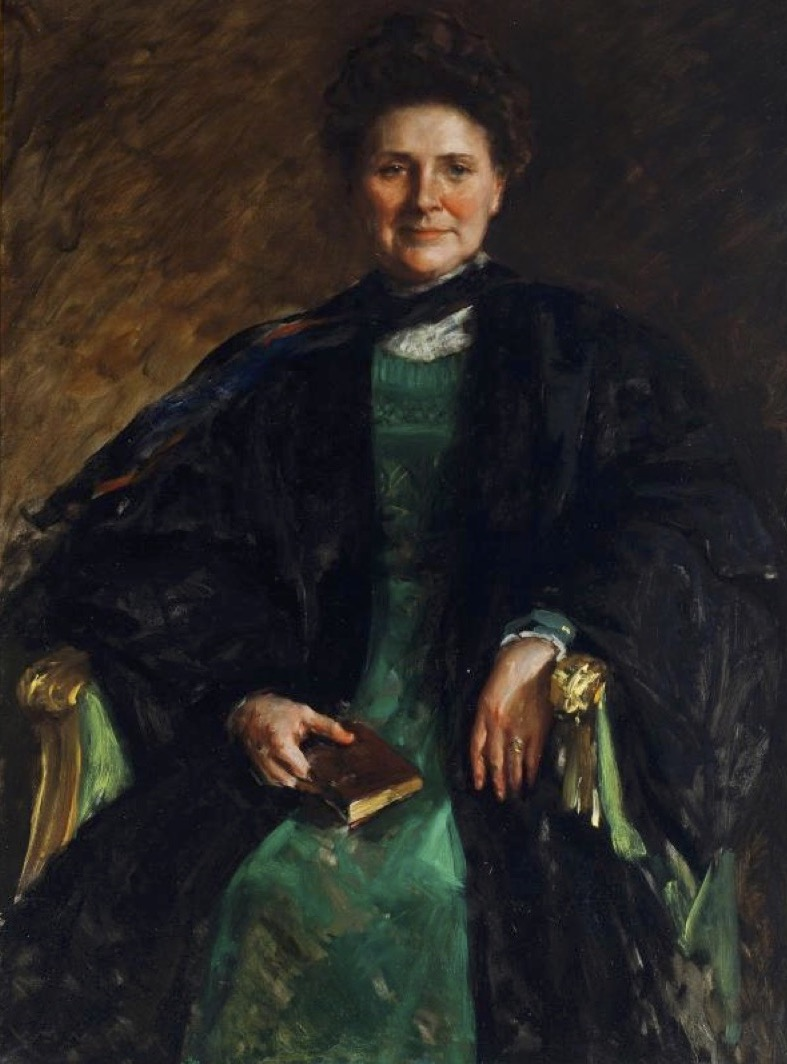
- Portrait of Myra Reynolds by William Merritt Chase, c. 1898
- Born: March 18, 1853; Troupsburg
- Died: August 20, 1936 (aged 83); Los Angeles
- Occupation: Literary scholar

Myra Reynolds (March 18, 1853 – August 20, 1936) was an American literary scholar.

Myra Reynolds was born on March 18, 1853, in Troupsburg, New York. She attended a normal school in Mansfield, Pennsylvania, from 1867 to 1870, after which she may have taught at the primary or secondary level. She entered Vassar College in 1876 and graduated with an AB in 1880. She then taught at Wells College as head of the English department from 1880 to 1882 as well as at the Free Academy in Corning, New York; and at Vassar.

In 1895, Reynolds received a PhD in English at the University of Chicago, where she was eventually appointed full professor in 1911. Early in her career, she specialized in the poetry of William Wordsworth. As of 1897, as an assistant professor, she taught a popular course called "Masterpieces in English Literature". As a literary scholar, Reynolds wrote on English poetry and edited selections from the work of Alfred, Lord Tennyson, and Robert Browning.

She retired in 1923, moving to near Pasadena, California. Reynolds died on August 20, 1936, in Los Angeles.

== Publications ==
- The Treatment of Nature in English Poetry between Pope and Wordsworth. University of Chicago Press. 1896. OCLC 1049888564.
- The Poems of Anne, Countess of Winchilsea. University of Chicago Press. 1903. OCLC 1050770286.
- The Learned Lady in England, 1650–1760. Houghton Mifflin. 1920. OCLC 1157149554.
