= Susan Henking =

American college president

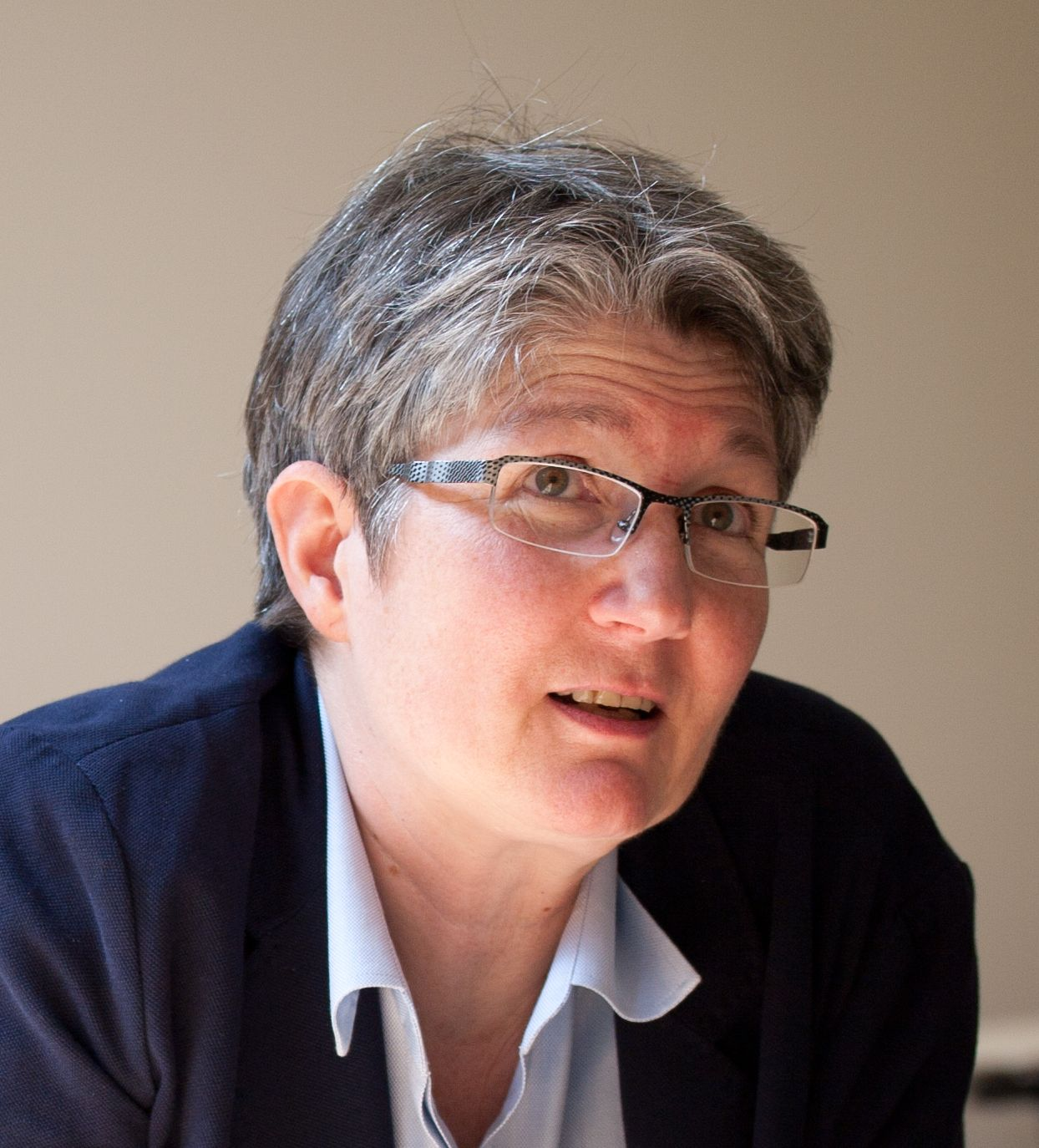
- Henking at Shimer College in 2012

20th President of Wells College
- Incumbent
- Assumed office June 30, 2024
- Preceded by: Jonathan Gibralter

14th President of Shimer College
- In office July 1, 2012 – June 1, 2017
- Preceded by: Ed Noonan (interim); Thomas Lindsay
- Succeeded by: college closed

Personal details
- Born: 1955 (age 70–71)
- Education: Duke University (BA); University of Chicago (MA, PhD)

Academic background
- Thesis: Protestant Religious Experience and the Rise of American Sociology (1988)
- Doctoral advisor: Peter Homans
- Other advisors: Donald Levine; Martin Marty

Academic work
- Discipline: LGBT studies; religious studies
- Institutions: Hobart and William Smith Colleges; Shimer College; Salem Academy and College; Wells College

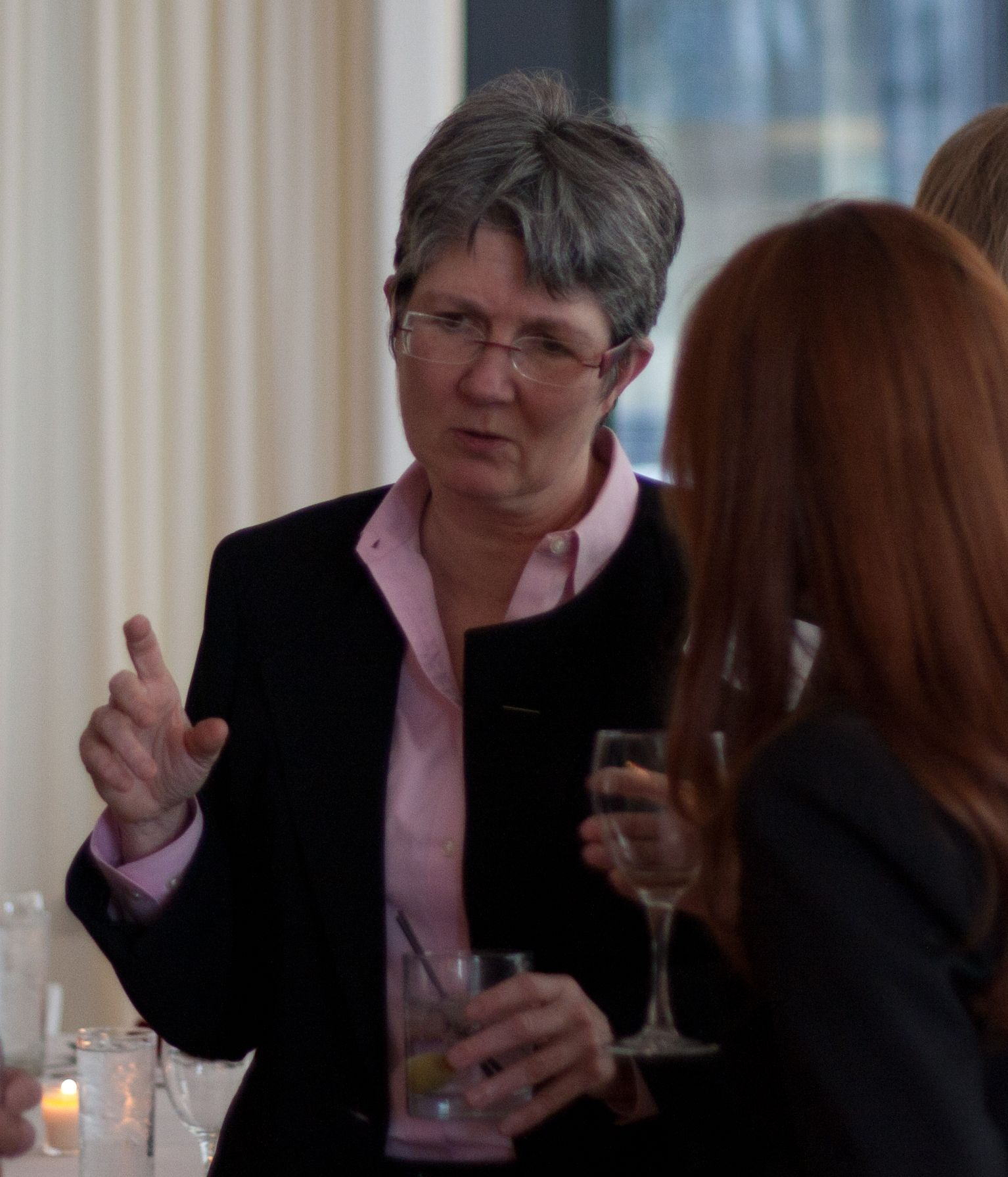
Henking at the 2012 Alumni Service Awards dinner

Susan E. Henking (born 1955) is an American religious studies scholar. She is currently the 20th president of Wells College. She was the 14th and final president of Shimer College in Chicago from 2012 to 2017. She then served in interim roles at Salem Academy and College, including Interim President in 2020 to 2021.

Henking was the first female president of Shimer since its 19th-century founder, Frances Shimer, ceded control to the University of Chicago, in 1896. At the time, Henking was one of the small number of openly lesbian college presidents.

== Education ==
Henking received her Bachelor of Arts degree from Duke University in 1977, and her Master of Arts degree from the University of Chicago Divinity School in 1979. She received her PhD from the University of Chicago Divinity School in 1988, and began teaching at Hobart and William Smith Colleges in 1988. Her doctoral dissertation was entitled Protestant Religious Experience and the Rise of American Sociology: A Contextual Study of Varieties of Secularization.

== Career ==
Henking taught at Hobart and William Smith Colleges, principally in the field of religious studies. She also taught in women's studies. In 1992, she received the Faculty Distinguished Teaching Award. During her time at the Colleges, Henking served on the Board of the American Academy of Religion and as founding editor of the Oxford University Press series Teaching Religious Studies, also of the American Academy of Religion. Henking was the interim Dean of Faculty from 1998 to 2001. She headed the Department of Religious Studies from 2002 to 2005, and 2008 to 2009. In addition, before her departure in the summer of 2012, she served as adviser to the Board of Trustees.

Henking has written and taught in the field of LGBT studies. Often her work has been at the junction of LGBT studies and religious studies, as in Que(e)rying Religion, the volume she co-edited in 1997, with Gary David Comstock. She co-chaired the program in LGBT studies at Hobart and William Smith, which was the first such program in the nation to offer a major.

In early 2012, Henking was chosen to become the 14th president of Shimer College. She was the first regular president of Shimer College after the acrimonious departure of Thomas Lindsay, in 2010.

During her five years at Shimer, Henking blogged on higher education and other topics on The Huffington Post and ChicagoNow. She was also a contributor to Religion Dispatches, an online magazine of religion, politics, and culture. Henking continues to publish in religious studies and in areas related to higher education.

From June 2020 to June 2021, Henking served as Interim President at Salem Academy and College.

On July 1, 2022, Henking became Vice President for Academic and Student Affairs at Wells College. On June 30, 2024, Henking became the 20th President of Wells College, and will oversee the closure of the school.

== Selected works ==
- 1992: "Protestant Religious Experience and the Rise of American Sociology," Journal of the History of the Behavioral Sciences 28(4): 325-339.
- 1993: "Rejected, Reclaimed, Renamed: Mary Daly on Psychology and Religion," Journal of Psychology and Theology 21(3): 199-207.
- 1996: "The Open Secret: Dilemmas of Advocacy in the (Religious Studies) Classroom." pp. 245–259 in Advocacy in the Classroom: Propaganda versus Engagement, Patricia Meyers Spacks ed. (New York: St. Martin's Press).
- 1996: "Proselytizing and Pedagogy", Religious Studies News 11, p. 8.
- 1997: Susan Henking and Gary David Comstock, eds. Que(e)rying Religion: A Critical Anthology (New York: Continuum)
- 2000: "Does (the History of ) Religion and Psychological Studies Have a Subject?" in Mapping Religion and Psychological Studies, Diane Jonte-Pace and William Parsons eds. (New York: Routledge).
- 2000: "Who is the Public Intellectual? Identity, Marginality, and the Religious Studies Scholar." ARC: Journal of the Faculty of Religious Studies, McGill University 28 (2000): 159-171.
- 2004: "Religion, Religious Studies and Higher Education: Into the 21st Century," Religious Studies Review 30(2,3): 129-136.
- 2006: "Difficult Knowledges: Gender, Sexuality, Religion," Spotlight on Teaching, October 2006.
- 2008: Susan Henking, Diane Jonte Pace, William Parsons, eds. Mourning Religion (University of Virginia Press).
- 2008:"More than a Quarter Century: HIV/AIDS and Religion," Religious Studies Review 34(3) pp. 129ff.
- 2014. "Reflections from Prestigious Leaders LGBTQ in Higher Education," Journal of Psychological Issues in Organizational Culture 5(1): pp. 60ff.
