= Ann Hughes (politician) =

American politician

Ann Hughes (born September 28, 1943) is an American politician.

Born in Ogdensburg, New York, Hughes received her bachelor's degree in biology from Wells College in 1965. Hughes also went to McHenry County College and lived in Woodstock, Illinois. In 1977, Hughes served on the Woodstock School Board. She then served on the McHenry County Board in 1980 and was chair of the board. Hughes was a Republican. Hughes served in the Illinois House of Representatives from 1993 until her resignation from the Illinois General Assembly on June 30, 1997.
