= Carolyn Elkins =

American poet, teacher, and editor

Carolyn Elkins is an American poet, teacher, and editor.

== Biography ==
Elkins received a B.A. in English from Wells College and an M.A. in English from the University of Tennessee at Knoxville. She has published three books and over 100 poems in journals in the United States and abroad. Elkins is the associate editor of Tar River Poetry, the poetry and fiction editor of POMPA, and a founding editor of Ruby Shoes Press. She has taught in the Poets in Person Program sponsored by the NEH and Poetry magazine. She lives with her husband Bill Spencer in Cullowhee, North Carolina.

== Awards ==
- 1999, Mississippi Humanities Council teaching award
- 2005, Excellence in Teaching Award at Delta State University

== Bibliography ==
- Angel Pays A Visit. Emrys Press, 2006. ISBN 0-9773516-1-0
- Daedalus Rising. Emrys Press, 2002. ISBN 0-9645778-7-9
- Coriolis Forces. Palanquin Press, 2000. ISBN 1-891508-21-0
