= Kelly Kadera =

American political scientist

- Born: Kelly M. Kadera
- Education: Wells College; University of Illinois, Urbana
- Occupation: Political scientist
- Awards: Best Book, APSA Conflict Processes; ISA Susan Northcutt Award
- Scientific career
- Fields: Political science
- Institutions: University of Iowa

Kelly M. Kadera is an American political scientist, currently a professor at the University of Iowa. She studies international conflict, democratic survival, and gender in academia using formal theory, dynamic modeling, and empirical methods.

== Early career and education ==
Kadera attended Wells College in Aurora, New York, receiving a BA in government in 1987. In 1988, she completed an MA in political science at the University of Illinois, Urbana, and in 1995 received a PhD there, also in political science. After finishing her PhD, Kadera became a professor at the University of Iowa in 1995.

== Career ==
In 2001, Kadera published the book The Power-Conflict Story: A Dynamic Model of Interstate Rivalry. The book uses dynamic modeling to capture patterns in the behavior of major world powers since 1816, focusing specifically on the rivalries between those powers. The book combines theories about balance of power and power transitions into a formal model which, through numerical simulations, produces more than a dozen specific hypotheses. Kadera then validates these predictions using empirical data. For this book, Kadera won the 2001 Best Book in Conflict Processes Award from the American Political Science Association. The book arose from Kadera's dissertation, for which she had previously won the 1996 Peace Science Society’s Walter Isard Dissertation Award.

Kadera's research on topics such as the survival of democratic regimes, international conflict management, and the evolution of war and peace over time has been published in journals including the American Journal of Political Science, International Studies Quarterly, and Conflict Management and Peace Science.

In addition to research on international conflict and the survival of democratic regimes, including pieces on gender and conflict studies, Kadera has notably worked on equity issues within world politics. She has published on the undervaluation of research done by women in the study of world politics, and has promoted the mentoring of women who are junior scholars in international relations. She was the first organizer of the Pay It Forward program at the International Studies Association, which organizes a workshop that connects women who are already established researchers in international studies as mentors for women who are junior scholars in the field. Kadera is also a founder and organizer of the Journeys in World Politics program, which has a similar mandate. For this work she received the 2016 Susan Northcutt Award from the International Studies Association, which "recognizes a person who actively works towards recruiting and advancing women and other minorities in the profession, and whose spirit is inclusive, generous and conscientious."

Kadera is a member of the 2020–2024 editorial leadership of the American Political Science Review, which is the most selective political science journal. She has also been an editor at the International Studies Review.

== Selected works ==
- The Power-Conflict Story: A Dynamic Model of Interstate Rivalry (2001)
- Kadera, K., Crescenzi, M., and M. Shannon. 2003. "Democratic Survival, Peace, and War in the International System." American Journal of Political Science
- Sjoberg, L., Kadera, K., and C. Thies. 2018. "Re-evaluating Gender and IR Scholarship: Moving beyond Reiter’s Dichotomies toward Effective Synergies." Journal of Conflict Resolution

== Selected awards ==
- 2001: Best Book Award, Conflict Processes Section of the American Political Science Association
- 2006–2007: Outstanding Teacher, University of Iowa Honors Program
- 2016: Susan Northcutt Award, International Studies Association
