= Louise Murray =

Louise Shipman Murray
- Born: 2 January 1854; Athens, Pennsylvania
- Died: 22 April 1931 (aged 77)
- Education: Wells College
- Occupation: Local historian
- Spouse: Millard P. Murray

Louise Murray, née Welles (2 January 1854 – 22 April 1931) was an American local historian and museum director.

== Life and work ==
Louise Shipman Murray was born in Athens, Pennsylvania on 2 January 1854. She graduated from Wells College in 1872 and married Millard P. Murray four years later. While the foundations for their house were being dug in 1882, an unusual Indian burial plot was unearthed that included portrait pottery and skeletal remains. Murray founded the Tioga Point Historical Society and the Tioga Point Museum in 1898. "She was director and archaeologist for three decades, using primary sources and progressive techniques unusual for so small a town". She also carried out independent research on local history and published The Story of Some French Refugees and Their ‘‘Azilum,’’ 1793–1800 in 1903. Five years later, Murray wrote A History of Old Tioga Point and Early Athens, Pennsylvania. In 1921, she wrote an article for American Anthropologist on aboriginal sites in and near ‘‘Teaga’’ (Athens), and, eight years later, she published Notes . . . on the Sullivan Expedition of 1799, based on documents in the Tioga Point Museum and other archives. She died on 22 April 1931.
