= Virginia Lacy Jones =

American librarian

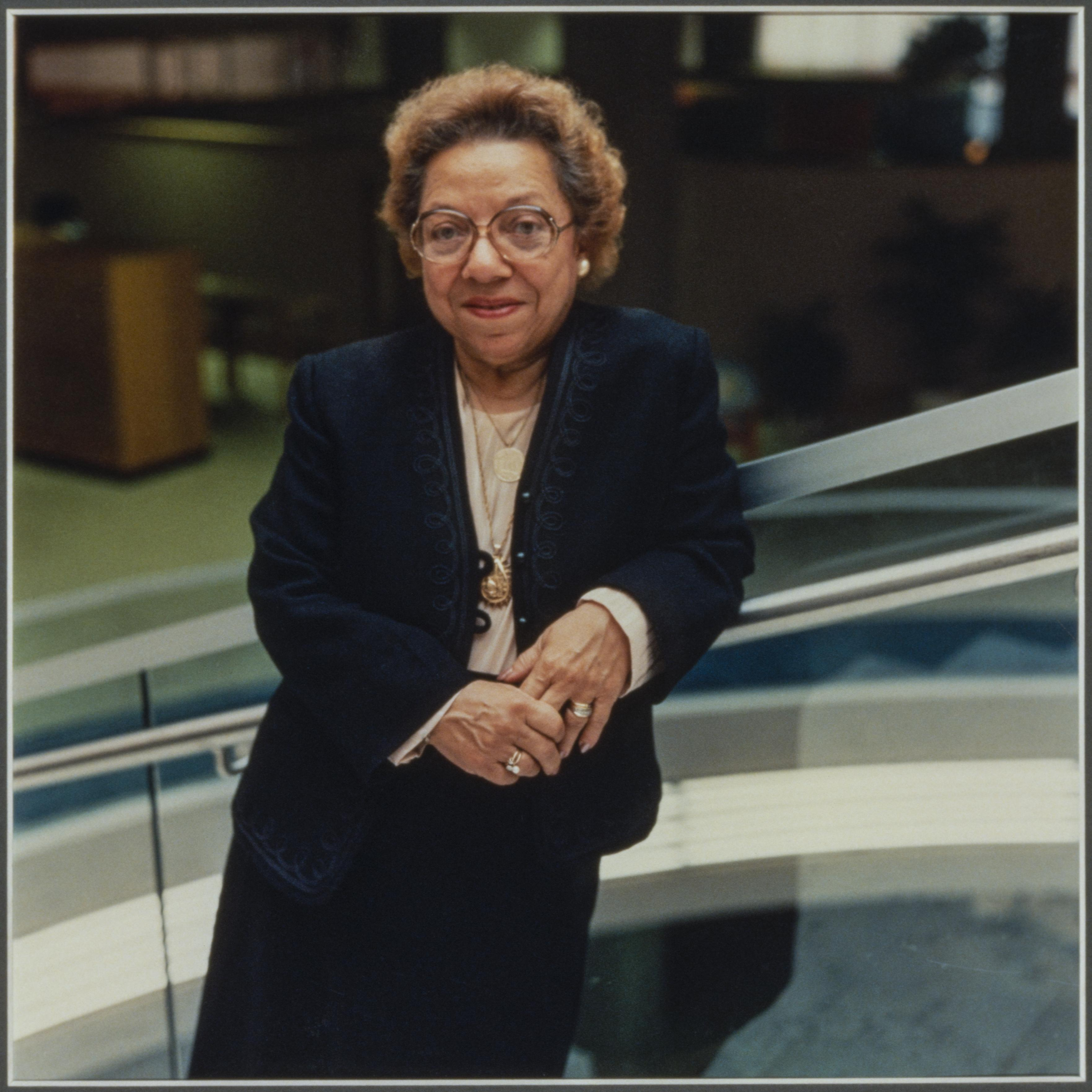
- Virginia L. Jones in 1982, photographed by Judith Sedwick
- Born: June 25, 1912; Cincinnati, Ohio
- Died: December 3, 1984 (aged 72)
- Occupation: Librarian

Virginia Lacy Jones (June 25, 1912 – December 3, 1984) was an American librarian who throughout her 50-year career in the field pushed for the integration of public and academic libraries. She was one of the first African Americans to earn a PhD in Library Science and became dean of Atlanta University's School of Library Sciences.

== Early life ==
Virginia Lacy was born to Edward and Ellen Lacy in Cincinnati, Ohio on June 25, 1912. She spent much of her childhood in Clarksburg, West Virginia. She recalled that growing up her family was "poor, hardworking, proud, and ambitious." She said that books and reading were always a part of her home life. She and her mother made frequent trips to the public library in Clarksburg, which was not segregated. In 1927, Jones moved to St. Louis, Missouri to live with an aunt and uncle. The move could have facilitated the path to a virtually expense-free college education through the Harris Teachers College as she desperately wanted to further her education, but her family was not able to afford it. She entered Sumner High School, where her uncle taught, and completed her final two years of school in 1929.

It was while in high school that Jones realized the possibility that librarianship would be a part of her future. It was an experience at the St. Louis Public Library that inspired her most. She was researching information for her church's citywide essay contest on "The Values of Attending Sunday School" when she encountered a friendly reference librarian. She remembers that after telling this librarian what she was looking for, the librarian showed her how to use the periodical indexes. Jones recalls, "This experience was a thrilling one for me, and my imagination ran wild at the magic of the St. Louis Public Library, a great storehouse of information, ideas, and inspiration. I thought that to be a librarian like that reference librarian who helped me in the St. Louis Public Library would be the greatest thing in the world."

== Education and career ==
After high school, Jones abandoned the idea of becoming a teacher and instead enrolled at the Hampton Institute in Hampton, Virginia, the only library school in the South at the time where African-Americans could be trained. There she met Florence Rising Curtis, who would play an integral role in Jones' career. Curtis was the director of the library school and would become a mentor to Jones, who earned a B.S. in Library Science from Hampton in 1933. Later that same year, she found employment in Kentucky as the assistant librarian of Louisville Municipal College, which was the African-American branch of the segregated University of Louisville. She soon realized that a career in librarianship would require an advanced degree, but in order to do so she first had to complete a bachelor's degree in education. Jones returned to the Hampton Institute and earned a B.S. in Social Studies Education in 1935.

During Jones' second tenure at Hampton, Curtis invited Jones, along with other faculty and students, to attend the American Library Association's annual conference in Richmond, Virginia. The Black participants were unable to attend the exhibits or stay in the provided accommodations, and special arrangements had to be made for them to attend the regular meetings. Due to her fair complexion, Jones was able to pass for white, and therefore she could stay at the hotel and view the exhibits. Jones later stated, "I never liked the idea of passing for white, but I did it, nevertheless... I had mixed feelings about doing so... on the other hand, I felt a sense of triumph in outsmarting the blatant and cruel racial discrimination of whites."

At this time, a realization of the importance of training for African-American school librarians began. Florence Curtis proposed the establishment of regional centers to provide summer classes for these librarians and chose Jones to head the program at the Prairie View A&M College in Texas. There courses were taught in reference, book selection, school library administration, and cataloging and classification.

In fall 1936, Jones returned to Louisville Municipal College as Head Librarian and she also taught courses for African-American public and high school librarians who needed to earn college credit in order to be certified by the state. Now ready to begin her graduate education, Virginia Lacy Jones received a General Education Board fellowship upon recommendation from her mentor Florence Curtis, to attend the University of Illinois. Curtis strongly believed that Jones would be beneficial to library development for African-Americans in the South. In 1938, Jones completed a master's in Library Science. Upon completion of her master's degree, she returned once again to Louisville Municipal College as librarian and instructor. However, there had been a change in leadership while Jones was away, and when it became apparent that she could no longer tolerate the working environment, Jones resigned.

The day following her resignation, Rufus Clement offered Jones a position as catalog librarian at Atlanta University. She had known Clement from Louisville Municipal College where he had been president. Clement had recently accepted the position of president at Atlanta University, where he had plans to create a library school to replace the school at the Hampton Institute, which had closed its doors.

Leaving Kentucky for Atlanta, Jones found herself taking part in something very exciting. Her new position allowed her to participate in the planning of what would become the Atlanta University School of Library Service. She was sent to library schools throughout the Eastern United States to observe the various programs. The school opened in the fall of 1941. The purpose and commitment of the school was to not only train librarians, but to create leaders for the betterment of library services in the South in general, and for African-Americans in particular. Again Jones held dual positions within the university. She was catalog librarian as well as an instructor. It was also in fall 1941 that she married Edward A. Jones, Professor of French and Chairman of the Foreign Languages Department at Morehouse College.

After she had been teaching for two years at Atlanta University, Virginia Lacy Jones was awarded a second fellowship provided by the General Education Board. This allowed Jones to attend the University of Chicago Graduate Library School where, in 1945, she became the second African-American to earn a doctorate in Library Science. Her dissertation was on "The Problems of Negro Public High School Libraries in Selected Southern Cities."

She served on the faculty at the Atlanta University School of Library Service until she was appointed Dean in 1945. She was the second person to hold this position, after Eliza Atkins Gleason, the first African-American to receive a doctorate in Library Science. Her tenure as dean of the School of Library Service ran until 1981. During the 36 years Jones spent as dean, the school trained some 1800 black librarians, which was more than any other school in the country.

After her retirement, Jones was appointed the first director of the Robert W. Woodruff Library at the Atlanta University Center, a position she held from 1982 to 1983. During her professional career, Jones wrote on issues that concerned libraries in the South and those dealing with Library Science education for African-Americans. The Robert W. Woodruff Library now houses 18.5 linear feet of these papers, as well correspondences, personal letters, and photographs all pertaining to her life.

She died in December 1984 in Atlanta and was buried in South-View Cemetery there.

== Honors and awards ==
During her professional career, Virginia Lacy Jones received numerous awards and recognitions.

- In 1973, Jones was awarded the Melvil Dewey Medal by the American Library Association.. She was the first African-American to receive this award.
- first African-American president of the Association for Library and Information Science Education. in 1976.
- In 1976 she was honored with American Library Association Honorary Membership. This is the association's highest honor.
- President Lyndon B. Johnson appointed Jones to the President's Advisory Committee on Library Research and Training Projects where she was responsible for the report on children's and youth services.
- Joseph W. Lippincott Award, which she was given in 1977..
- honorary Doctor of Letters from the University of Michigan (1979), *Beta Phi Mu Award (Library Science Honorary Society) Award (1980),
- Mary Rothrock Award (1980)..

In 1985, the Robert W. Woodruff Library's exhibition hall at Atlanta University was named for her. In 1999, American Libraries named her one of the "100 Most Important Leaders We Had in the 20th Century."

== Bibliography ==
- Jones, Virginia Lacy (1970). "A Dean's Career". In Josey, Elonnie J. (ed.). The Black Librarian in America. Metuchen, New Jersey: The Scarecrow Press, Inc. pp. 19–42. ISBN 9780810803626. OCLC 1067330843.
- Caynon, William; Du Mont, Rosemary Ruhig (1990). "Jones, Virginia Lacy (1912-1984)". In Wiegand, Wayne A. (ed.). Supplement to the Dictionary of American Library Biography. Englewood, Colo.: Libraries Unlimited. pp. 42–46. ISBN 9780872875869. OCLC 311463658 – via Google Books.
- Smith, Jessie Carnie, ed. (1992). "Virginia Lacy Jones". Notable Black American Women. Gale. pp. 606–609. ISBN 9780810347496. OCLC 24468213 – via Gale In Context: Biography.
- Jordan, Casper LeRoy (1994). "The Multifaceted Career of Virginia Lacy Jones". In Josey, Elonnie J. (ed.). The Black Librarian in America Revisited. Metuchen, New Jersey: The Scarecrow Press, Inc. pp. 75–80. ISBN 9780810828308. OCLC 832195112.
- Jones, Reinette F. (2002). Library Service to African Americans in Kentucky. North Carolina: McFarland & Company, Inc. ISBN 9780786411542. OCLC 248269321 – via Google Books.
- Fultz, Michael (Summer 2006). "Black Public Libraries in the South in the Era of De Jure Segregation". Libraries & the Cultural Record. 41 (3): 337–359. doi:10.1353/lac.2006.0042. S2CID 142811711.
