= Winter Wheat (novel) =

1944 novel by Mildred Walker

- Author: Mildred Walker
- Language: English
- Genre: Western novel
- Publisher: Harcourt Brace
- Publication date: October 10, 1944
- Publication place: United States
- Media type: Print (Paperback)
- Pages: 306
- ISBN: 0156972255

Winter Wheat is a 1944 novel by Mildred Walker. The novel is a coming of age story about a young woman named Ellen Webb who questions her life on her family's wheat farm after leaving Montana to attend college.

Winter Wheat is Walker's most popular and lucrative novel, which has received praise for its authentic depictions of life in the west. It was selected for One Book Montana in 2003. Originally published in 1944 by Harcourt Brace, Bison Books published a new edition in 1992 with an introduction by James Welch.

== Plot ==
Winter Wheat is narrated from the perspective of its protagonist Ellen Webb. Set in the fictional town of Gotham, Montana in the early 1940s, the story revolves around Ellen and her parents who live on a small ranch growing dry-land wheat. After selling their crop at a decent price, Ellen's parents send her to college in Minnesota. At college, Ellen falls in love with Gilbert Borden, a senior whose father is a professor at the college, and before the school year ends, Gil proposes to Ellen.

She returns to the farm for the summer and resumes her old patterns helping with farm work and awaits Gil's impending visit to Montana in early June. Before his arrival, Ellen is excited to show him the parts of Montana she loves. Gil is uneasy when he arrives and leaves after only a few days. He later breaks off their engagement in a letter, arguing that their lives are too different for them to be happy together.

Gil's visit, and his quick departure, forces Ellen to reflect on her life in Montana and the relationship between her parents, which she begins to see through Gil's eyes. Ellen's father, Benjamin Webb, is a World War I veteran with shrapnel injuries and her mother, Anna Petrovna, is his Russian bride who nursed him back to health after he was injured in the war. Ellen originally romanticized their relationship, but as she reflects on her own heartbreak, she develops a cynical view of her parent's relationship and their decision to settle in Montana. Unsure of where she fits in the world, Ellen struggles to understand her parents and herself, and to make sense of the past and her future.

When a hail storm damages a large portion of their crop, Ellen's parents do not have enough money to send her back to school. Instead, Ellen takes a teaching position in a one-room school house in the town of Prairie Butte right before the outbreak of World War II. She teaches at the school for half a year where she begins to appreciate her independence and reflect on her relationship with Gil. She also builds connections with the students at the school, especially a young boy named Leslie Harper. Leslie's mother died and Ellen helps the boy reconnect with his father. Eventually, tragedy and local gossip force Ellen to move back to her family's ranch. When Leslie's father Warren enlists in the army, Ellen and her parents offer to let Leslie come and live with them in Gotham.

Walker uses the metaphor of winter wheat to reflect on themes work and resilience, which run throughout the novel.

== Reception ==
Winter Wheat was Mildred Walker's most successful and popular novel. It was one of the first American novels to be printed in a paperback edition for distribution overseas to members of the armed forces, and Walker received many letters from soldiers who received copies of her book.

A review for the New York Times, praised Winter Wheat and Walker for "writing that glows with simplicity that is admirably suited to the land she loves and the characters she portrays."

Bison Press began republishing Walker's works in 1992, beginning with Winter Wheat, which marked a period of renewed critical and popular success during the last decade of her life.
