= Mildred Walker =

American novelist

- Born: May 2, 1905; Philadelphia, Pennsylvania
- Died: May 27, 1998 (aged 93); Portland, Oregon
- Education: Wells College; University of Michigan
- Occupation: Novelist
- Writing career
- Genres: Regionalist; historical

Mildred Walker (Schemm) (May 2, 1905 – May 27, 1998) was an American novelist who published 12 novels and was nominated for the National Book Award. She graduated from Wells College and from the University of Michigan. She was a faculty member at Wells College from 1955 to 1968. Walker died in 1998 in Portland, Oregon.

== Biography ==
Mildred Walker was born in Philadelphia, Pennsylvania on May 2, 1905. Her father was a Baptist minister and her mother a school teacher. She and her family spent summers at a vacation home in Grafton, Vermont. In 1926 she graduated magna cum laude in literature from Wells College in Aurora, New York. In 1927 she enrolled in graduate school at the University of Michigan where she met and married Dr. Ferdinand Schemm. The couple had three children. Walker earned a master's degree from the University of Michigan and also completed her first novel Fireweed. Earnings from this book allowed the Walker and her family to move to Great Falls, Montana in 1933. Her husband Ferdinand joined the Great-Falls Clinic where he practiced as a cardiologist and surgeon.

In 1944 Walker published Winter Wheat. Income from this book allowed the family to move to a new home christened Beaverbank on the Missouri River, ten miles south of Great Falls. In 1955, Schemm died of heart failure. His death left Walker widowed and alone, as her three children were grown. Walker returned to Wells College where she taught creative writing and literature. From 1961 to 1962 she was a Fulbright lecturer in Kyoto, Japan. In 1964 she traveled to Sicily, Italy on sabbatical. She was twice a staff member at the summer Breadloaf Conference in Vermont.

In 1968 Walker ended her teaching career at Wells and returned to the Walker family summer home in Grafton, Vermont to concentrate on her writing. She lived there for 18 years, teaching briefly at Castleton University, where her grandson, Oliver Schemm now teaches art. While living at Grafton, Walker completed a historical novel titled If a Lion Could Talk and her only children's book A Piece of the World. In 1986, after having suffered a stroke that limited her physical abilities, she returned to Montana to live with her daughter. A series of strokes over the next 10 years lessened her abilities until she could no longer speak or drive. In 1990, she moved to a retirement home in Portland, OR to be closer to her eldest son's family. She died in Portland on May 27, 1998. Her last novel, The Orange Tree remained unfinished at the time of her death.

== Career ==
Walker published her first novel, Fireweed, in 1934, while she attended the University of Michigan as a graduate student. Fireweed earned Walker the Avery Hopwoood Award, the biggest prize then awarded from an American University, and $1,500. This income enabled Walker and her family to move to Great Falls, Montana. Schemm was highly supportive of Walker's writing career. He agreed to engage a housekeeper, allowing Walker to devote most of her time to writing. Only Schemm and Roy Cowden, one of Walker's former University of Michigan's professors, were allowed to read her work before it was sent off to Walker's publisher, Harcourt, Brace & Co.

In 1935 Walker published "Light from Arcturus." It was the January 1939 selection of the Literary Guild of America which called her "a master of the novel form". The Literary Guild went on to predict that the novel was sure to launch her from obscurity to an American writer of great importance.

In 1941, she published Unless the Wind Turns, her first novel set in Montana. In 1944, Winter Wheat was published. In 1955, Walker published The Curlew’s Cry. In that same year, Schemm died. Walker moved back to New York to teach at Wells College. In 1960, The Body of a Young Man was published. Despite mixed reviews, with The New York Times calling her style "pedestrian", it was nominated for a National Book Award. However, Walker was deeply affected by the negative reviews, describing it as "rejected" and eventually ceasing to refer to the work at all. She began writing her next novel, If a Lion Could Talk, an ambitious historical novel centered on missionaries in the American West. In 1968 she retired from Wells College and moved to the Walker family summer house in Grafton, Vermont where she remained for 18 years. There she completed "If a Lion Could Talk", published in 1970, and her only children's book, A Piece of the World, published in 1972, which tells the story of a rock left behind by a receding glacier.

Starting in 1986, Walker suffered a series of strokes which significantly affected her physical and mental abilities. She continued to work on her last novel The Orange Tree until her death in 1998. She spent nearly two decades revising the novel but was unable to complete it before her death. The novel was later edited by the author and scholar Carmen Pearson and published posthumously in 2006 by the University of Nebraska Press.

All of Walker's novels were first published by Harcourt, Brace & Co. By the mid-1970s her novels were mostly out of print. In 1992, the University of Nebraska Press began reissuing all of her works, starting with Winter Wheat. In 2003 Winter Wheat was chosen by the Montana Center for the Book as the "One Book Montana" subject for reading discussions throughout the state.

== Critical reception ==
Walker has traditionally been considered a "regionalist" writer, as four of her novels, including Winter Wheat and Curlew’s Cry, are set in the state of Montana. Despite her connection with the region, she is not mentioned in A Literary History of the American West. It has been suggested that the publication of A.B. Guthrie’s The Big Sky in 1947 and The Way West in 1950, with its romanticized "mutely tragic" mountain man character and unspoiled scenic wildernesses, turned American reader interest away from the modern West to a focus on the vision of a "...prairie-and mountain Eden, always long-gone." Walker's grounded work that explored the farming and ranching life that came after the period of westward exploration, became less memorable in the shadow of this new, heroic, and mythologized "Old West".

In her book Modernity and Mildred Walker, Carmen Pearson argues against the regionalist label and asserts Walker's place in modern literature. Pearson contends that Walker was greatly influenced by her exposure to and exploration of a diversity of literature during her tenure at Wells College. Her later works contain themes of "economic needs, of warfare, of women's changing roles, of evolving technology, and of movement and displacement". Pearson writes: "...today, her novels remain relevant and infused with the energy of compromise and the language of movement: her modernism".

Other critics suggest that the decline in popularity of her later works was due to heavy handed literary influences and that they lack the "freshness and spontaneity" so appealing in her earlier works. Her novels, populated with noble characters and written with "ladylike" dignity, have not always remained as relevant to the modern reader who began to value rebellious, boundary-pushing characters and themes towards the end of Walker's career.

== Works ==
=== Novels ===
- Fireweed, 1934
- Light from Arcturus, 1935
- Dr. Norton's Wife, 1938
- The Brewers' Big Horses, 1940
- Unless the Wind Turns, 1941
- Winter Wheat, 1944
- The Quarry, 1947
- Medical Meeting, 1949
- The Southwest Corner, 1951
- The Curlew's Cry, 1955
- The Body of a Young Man, 1960
- If a Lion Could Talk, 1970
- The Orange Tree, 2006

=== Children's books ===
- A Piece of the World, 1972
