= James McMahon (mathematician) =

Irish American mathematician

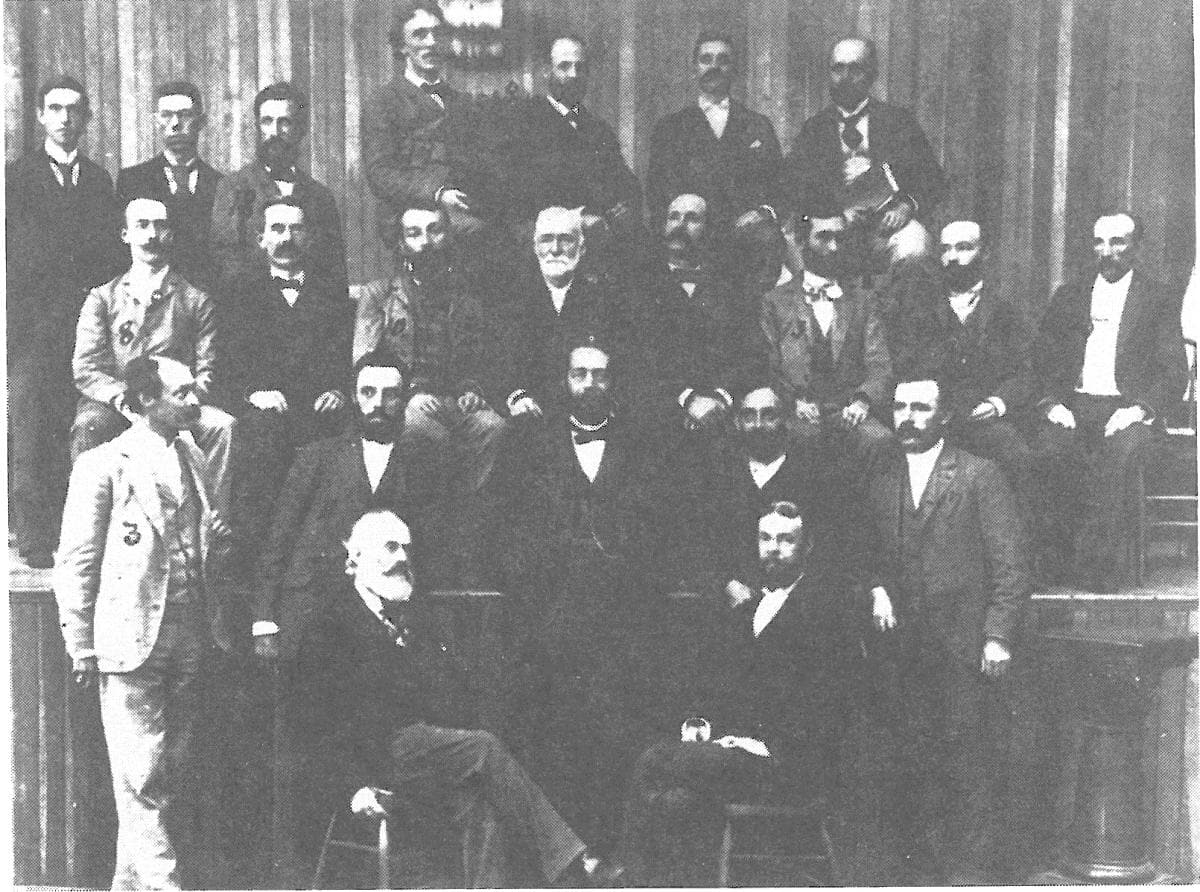
James McMahon at the International Congress of Mathematicians, 1893 in Chicago (3rd row, 2nd from right)

James McMahon (April 22, 1856 – June 1, 1922) was an Irish mathematician whose career was spent at Cornell University in Ithaca, New York. He was a committed educator, and an early proponent of professionalization in the teaching of advanced mathematics in America. A professor and Chairman of the Mathematics Department in Cornell University's College of Arts & Sciences, McMahon was one of the earliest members of the American Mathematical Society (as the predecessor New York Mathematical Society) in 1891. For seven years he served as associate editor of the Annals of Mathematics. He was also the American Association for the Advancement of Science's Secretary (1897), Section A (Mathematics and Astronomy); General Secretary (1898), and Vice-President (1901). McMahon was also featured in the publication, American Men (and Women) of Science.

== Early life ==
Professor McMahon was born in County Armagh, Ireland on April 22, 1856, the son of Robert McMahon and Mary Hewitt. He took up general studies in the Classical Program at Trinity College, Dublin in 1879. By completion of studies, McMahon was ranked among the first members of the class of 1881 and took highest honors in Metaphysics and Classical Studies. McMahon had been awarded the Wray Prize in 1880. The honor was created from a gift of Mrs. Catherine Wray in 1848, spouse to the late Reverend Henry Wray, D.D., Vice Provost of Trinity and Senior Fellow, to encourage Metaphysical studies. The second prize taken by McMahon was Trinity's Brooke Prize for Classical Studies. He graduated A.B. with two gold medals from Dublin in 1881, receiving the degree of A.M. in 1890 and the D.Sc. in 1918. McMahon arrived in Ithaca, New York in January 1883. His initial introduction to Cornell University was as an examiner in the Mathematics Department and as an instructor for Andrew Dickson White's “Correspondence University”, a distance learning initiative of 1883.

In 1884, James McMahon became a Cornell instructor, in 1890 an assistant professor, and in 1904 a member of the Cornell Faculty as professor of mathematics. He was one of the two most prominent Cornell mathematicians of this early period–the other one being James Oliver. In 1893 McMahon helped to found the Sigma Xi Society. The idea was to create the Phi Beta Kappa of the sciences, a concession that the literary and arts focused Phi Beta Kappa Society was perceived as being tied to an older collegiate focus antedating the rise of science and engineering in the university curriculum. The First Convention of Sigma Xi was held at Cornell University. McMahon was a delegate from Cornell University; Ernest G. Merritt represented the University of Kansas. McMahon's focus was on the policy by which the society would expand. He also served as vice president (1905) and President (1909) of the Theta Chapter, Phi Beta Kappa, and was succeeded by Madison Bentley (1909) and Alfred Hayes, Jr. (1910). On June 26, 1890, James McMahon married into Cornell University's Crane family. He was spouse to Katharine Crane, sister to Professor “TeeFee” Crane. Five years later, the chairman of the Cornell Mathematics Department, Professor William Oliver, died. The university leased the Oliver cottage at 7 Central Avenue, and adjacent to Professor Crane's cottage, to the McMahons. James McMahon lived on Central Avenue from 1895 until his death in 1922.

== Expertise ==
In the history of applied mathematics, McMahon's most significant contribution came late in life and was published posthumously. In 1902, McMahon had delivered an address to the Section on Mathematics and Astronomy, American Association for the Advancement of Science, then assembled at Pittsburgh, Pennsylvania, entitled “Some Recent Applications of the Function Theory to Physical Problems”. His work in the field of geometry had taken an “applied” direction, seeking those instances were the abstract theories of his discipline could be applied to the daily problems addressed by scientists and engineers. As theoretical statistics developed into a modern discipline, its practitioners were using geometrical representation in their presentations. The cross pollination of statistics with geometry led to increased interest in geometric theory. Professor Karl Pearson proposed that a specialist in geometry work out the trigonometry of higher-dimensioned plane space for all the relations between multiple correlation and partial correlation coefficients when variates are properties of the angles, edges and perpendiculars of sphero-polyhedron multiple space. A pure mathematician was needed to write, in effect, a treatise on “Spherical Polyhedrometry.” McMahon took up Pearson's charge as he was entering emeritus status. The Carnegie Institute had granted him a retirement annuity allowing him to step down as Chair of Cornell's Mathematics Department and spend his final years focused on new developments in the field. Renting a cottage in Key West, Florida, Professor McMahon and spouse Katherine Crane McMahon spent the Ithaca winter down in the Caribbean, while the professor worked on the new “Spherical Polyhedrometry”. The results were published the year after McMahon's death as the paper Hyperspherical Geometry; and its Application to Correlation Theory for N Variables.

== Progressive ==
In 1916, McMahon took a public position on the re-election campaign of President Woodrow Wilson. While Chair of the Mathematics Department at Cornell University, Professor McMahon supplied the Democratic National Committee with three reasons to favor Wilson. Chief among McMahon's reasons for supporting the President were Wilson's advocacy on behalf of international law in the face of strong domestic opposition; Wilson's opposition to the de facto, at the expense of a de jure, government of Mexico; and Wilson's success in advancing “. . . many positive constructive and forward-looking achievements . . . as well as its enlightened Americanism . . . .” McMahon took sabbatic leave in academic year 1920–1921. When he returned in 1921 he had a Carnegie pension which permitted him to focus on the framing of “Spherical Polyhedrometry”, a subject he pursued until his death later that year.

== Member ==
Professor McMahon was a member of Phi Beta Kappa society, Sigma Xi society, the London Mathematical Society; the American Mathematical Society, the Circolo Matematico di Palermo, and the Brotherhood of Saint Andrew (and served as treasurer of that organization in preparation for its 1917 Assembly at Ithaca, New York). He was also a member of Phi Kappa Psi, and through that organization, the Irving Literary Society. McMahon was a fellow of the American Association for the Advancement of Science. From 1916 to 1922, he served as a Vestryman for Ithaca's St. John's Episcopal Church.

== Selected publications ==
=== Articles ===
- 1889 On the Expression for the Hessian of a Binary Quantic in Terms of the Roots, 5 Annals of Mathematics 17.
- 1893 On the descending series for Bessel's functions of both kinds, 8 Annals of Mathematics 57.
- 1894 On the Roots of the Bessel and Certain Related Functions, 9 Annals of Mathematics 23–30.
- 1906 The Cornell Chapter of Phi Beta Kappa, (with C.S. Northrup), Theta of New York.
- 1923 Hyperspherical Goniometry; and its Application to Correlation Theory for N Variables, 15 Biometrika 173–208. (See goniometry.)

=== Talks ===
- 1902 Some recent applications of function-theory to physical problems, address before the Section of Mathematics and Astronomy, American Association for the Advancement of Science.
- 1909 Address to the Phi Beta Kappa Initiates, (Apr. 21, 1909).

=== Books ===
- 1898 Elements of the Differential Calculus, (with Virgil Snyder, Lucien A. Wait, ed.), Cornell Mathematical Series.
- Elementary Geometry–Plane American Book Company, 1903
- Hyperbolic Functions Tract No 4 in the Mathematical Monograph series edited by Mansfield Merriman & Robert S. Woodward, Wiley & Son, 1906
