= Florence Ledyard Cross Kitchelt =

American suffragist (1874–1961)

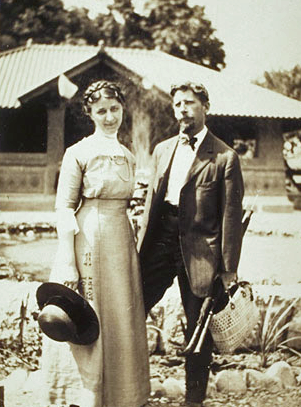
- Kitchelt and her husband in 1911
- Born: Florence Ledyard Cross; December 17, 1874; Rochester, New York, U.S.
- Died: April 4, 1961 (aged 86); Wilberforce, Ohio, U.S.
- Education: Wells College
- Occupations: activist, settlement worker
- Spouse: Richard Kitchelt

Florence Ledyard Cross Kitchelt (1874 – 1961) was an American peace advocate, settlement house worker, socialist, and suffragist.

== Biography ==
Kitchelt née Cross was born on December 17, 1874, in Rochester, New York. She graduated from Wells College in 1897.

Kitchelt began her career in social work by working at the George Junior Republic, in Freeville, New York. She also worked at New York College Settlement in New York City, Lowell House in New Haven, Connecticut, and Little Italy House in Brooklyn, New York. She went to Rochester, New York where she help establish the Practical House Keeping Center under the guidance of the Women's Educational and Industrial Union and the First Unitarian Church of Rochester.

In 1911 she married fellow socialist Richard Kitchelt.

In 1914, Kitchelt ran for state office (secretary of state in New York) as a Socialist. She did not win. Around this time Kitchelt also worked as an advocate for women's suffrage in New York state and Connecticut.

She was a member of the League of Nations Health Committee from 1924 through 1930.

Kitchelt donated her papers divided by topicto several institutions, including Cornell University, Radcliffe College, Smith College, and Yale University.

Kitchelt died on April 4, 1961, in Wilberforce, Ohio.
