= Catherine R. Gira =

American educator and administrator (1932–2019)

13th President of Frostburg State University
- In office September 1, 1991 – June 30, 2006
- Preceded by: Herbert F. Reinhard Jr.
- Succeeded by: Jonathan Gibralter

Personal details
- Born: Catherine Russell; October 30, 1932 Fayette City, Pennsylvania
- Died: March 26, 2019 (aged 86) Columbia, Maryland
- Spouse: Joseph Gira (m. 1954; died 1976)
- Children: 2
- Education: Pennsylvania Western University, California (BA); Johns Hopkins University (MA); American University (PhD)
- Occupation: Educator and university administrator

Catherine Russell Gira (October 30, 1932 – March 26, 2019) was an American educator and administrator who was president of Frostburg State University from 1991 to 2006.

== Biography ==
Gira was born in Fayette City, Pennsylvania on October 30, 1932. She received a bachelor's degree from Pennsylvania Western University, California, a master's degree from Johns Hopkins University and a Ph.D. from American University.

Gira married Joseph Gira in 1954, and they raised two children, Cheryl and Tom, in Columbia, Maryland.

Gira began her teaching career as a high school English teacher, worked as a writing instructor at Johns Hopkins University, and then joined the faculty at the University of Baltimore. Her academic specialty was the study of the works of William Shakespeare. She became Dean of the College of Liberal Arts, president of the Faculty Senate, and then Provost of the University. She was responsible for budgeting and planning for the growth of the university in the 1980s and served as president of the American Association of University Administrators.

Gira was named president of Frostburg State University in 1991. During her tenure, the university achieved accreditation for its Colleges of Business and Education, and she oversaw the construction of a performing arts center and new science buildings. When she retired in 2006, she established the Catherine R. Gira Campus to Community Fund. The Center for Communications and Information Technology was named in her honor upon its completion in 2015.

In 1992, Gira was named Outstanding Woman of the Year by the Women Legislators of Maryland, and she was named among Maryland’s Top 100 Women by Warfields’ Business Record in 1996. She was inducted into the Maryland Women's Hall of Fame in 1997.

Gira died in Columbia, Maryland on March 26, 2019.

== Publications ==
- Gira, Catherine Russell (1975). Shakespeare's Venus Figures and Renaissance Tradition. American University.
- Catherine Gira; Adele F. Seeff (1994). Henry IV, Parts 1 and 2 : an annotated bibliography. Garland. ISBN 0824070976.
