= Jonathan Gibralter =

Academic administrator

19th President of Wells College
- In office July 1, 2015 – June 20, 2024
- Preceded by: Thomas E. J. de Witt (interim)
- Succeeded by: Susan Henking

14th President of Frostburg State University
- In office August 2006 – June 30, 2015
- Preceded by: Catherine R. Gira
- Succeeded by: Ronald Nowaczyk

3rd President of the State University of New York at Farmingdale
- In office June 2001 – August 2006
- Preceded by: Frank A. Cipriani
- Succeeded by: W. Hubert Keen

Personal details
- Spouse: Laurie
- Education: Queensborough Community College; Binghamton University (BA); New York University (MA); Syracuse University (PhD); University of Maryland Global Campus (MBA)

Jonathan C. Gibralter (born 1956) is an American academic executive. He served as president of Farmingdale State College in East Farmingdale, New York, from 2001 to 2006; president of Frostburg State University in Maryland, from 2006 to 2015; and president of Wells College in Aurora, Cayuga County, New York, from 2015 to June 2024.

== Early life and education ==
Gibralter grew up in Bayside, Queens, New York, and attended Queensborough Community College. He earned a bachelor of arts degree in psychology from Binghamton University in 1978, a master of arts degree in counseling psychology from New York University in 1982, a Ph.D. in human development from Syracuse University in 1996, and an MBA from University of Maryland Global Campus in 2013.

== Career ==
In 1986, he began teaching at the State University of New York at Morrisville, later becoming Director of Individual Studies (1988-1990) and Associate Dean for the School of Liberal Arts (1990-1993). From 1993 to 1998, Gibralter was the dean of the Rome, New York, campus of Mohawk Valley Community College. Gibralter was the Dean of Academic Affairs, and then Interim President, at Corning Community College, from 1998 to 2001.

=== President of Farmingdale State College (2001–2006) ===
He was president of Farmingdale State College in East Farmingdale, New York, from 2001 to 2006.

=== President of Frostburg State University (2006–2015) ===
In 2006, he became president of Frostburg State University in Frostburg, Maryland, and remained in that position until 2015. In September 2008, Gibralter was honored with the Presidential Leadership Award for his efforts in promoting a campus climate that de-emphasized alcohol and combatted binge drinking at Frostburg State University.

=== President of Wells College (2015–2024) ===
In 2015, he became president of Wells College. Gibralter inherited a school that was struggling. Before Gibralter took office, in order to boost revenue and continue operations, the college allowed men to enroll for the first time in 2005, and obtained court approval to borrow restricted funds from its endowment in 2010.

In 2019, the college was placed on probation by its accreditor, the middle states commission on higher education for non compliance with the agency’s planning, resources and institutional improvement standard. 1 In 2020 the college was at risk of closing due to the lack of enrollment caused by the Covid-19 pandemic. Gibralter stated that if in person education did not resume, the school would have to close. Wells was able to continue operating due to funding from the federal government to help institutions survive the pandemic. 1 During this time significant faculty turnover occurred, with many retiring or moving to other institutions. 2020 also saw the implementation of a partnership with Syracuse University to boost enrollment. 3 In 2021 the middle states commission of higher education announced Wells College was in compliance and no longer on probation.

On April 29, 2024, Board Chair, Marie Chapman-Carroll and Gibralter announced that Wells was closing due to financial issues. The board’s vote approving the closure of the school was not unanimous. There was considerable controversy over the abrupt notice of the closure during the last week of the Spring 2024 semester, and criticism of Gibralter for receiving bonus money. Gibralter received at least 310 thousand dollars in bonus money between 2016 and 2021. 2 Gibralter notified the Hiawatha Institute of the schools closure shortly before the public announcement. 3

Reporting since the closure announcement documented evidence that administrators at the college had been privately planning for a potential closure for at least seven months, while publicly reassuring the community, students and faculty that the school would continue operations. 5 Gibralter attempted to create new partnerships with other institutions in the final months of the academic year in an effort to save the school, however those partnerships did not materialize. 4 The closure decision displaced 352 students and 140 employees. 5 On June 20, 2024, it was announced that the Wells College Board of Trustees and President Gibralter had "parted ways". 6 Gibralter continued to be compensated after his departure from the college. He was paid 220 thousand dollars by the college during the period of July 1st, 2024 - June 30th, 2025.

== Personal life ==
Gibralter is the father of two adult sons and is married to Laurie Gibralter.
