= Nelle Swartz =

American labor official (1882-1952)

- Swartz, from a 1928 newspaper
- Born: February 25, 1881; Ashland, Ohio, U.S.
- Died: March 5, 1952 (aged 71); New York, New York, U.S.
- Occupations: Labor official, social worker

Nelle Swartz (February 25, 1881 – March 5, 1952) was an American social worker and labor official, head of the New York State Bureau of Women in Industry and member of the State Industrial Board.

== Early life and education ==
Swartz was born in Ashland, Ohio, the daughter of Joseph R. Swartz and Samantha Ciphers Swartz. She graduated from Wells College in 1904.

== Career ==
Swartz was a settlement worker and social worker in Brooklyn after college. She was superintendent of the Charity Organization Society of Elizabeth, New Jersey from 1910 to 1913, and executive secretary of the Consumers League of New York from 1913 to 1918. She was involved in the investigations after the Triangle Shirtwaist Factory Fire in 1911.

In 1918, Swartz was appointed first chief of the Bureau of Women in Industry, in the New York State Department of Labor. In 1919 she traveled with the Women's Industrial Commission delegation to study postwar labor issues in England, France, Belgium and Italy. She spoke to live audiences and on radio broadcasts about workers' issues.

Swartz was appointed to the New York State Industrial Board by governor Franklin Roosevelt in 1929. In 1930 she spoke in support of unemployment insurance as preferable to charity. In 1938 she joined the Citizens Committee for Planned Parenthood, and organized in opposition to the Equal Rights Amendment. She retired from the State Workmen's Compensation Board in 1951.

== Publications ==
- The cost of clean clothes in terms of health; A study of laundries and laundry workers in New York City (1917, with Louis I. Harris)
- A new day for the colored woman worker; A study of colored women in industry in New York City (1919, with Jessie Clark and Gertrude E. McDougald)
- "The Trend in Women's Wages" (1929)

== Personal life ==
Swartz died in 1952, at the age of 71, in New York City.
