= Florence Rising Curtis =

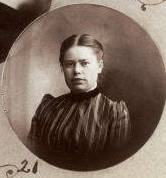
- Born: September 30, 1873; Ogdensburg
- Died: October 6, 1944 (aged 71); Richmond
- Alma mater: Wells College; New York State Library School; University of Minnesota; University of Illinois system
- Occupation: Librarian
- Employer: Drexel University; Hampton University; Henan University; Philippine Normal University; University at Albany; University of Illinois system

Florence Rising Curtis (1873-1944) was a library educator, chiefly known for her work as director of Hampton Institute Library School beginning in 1925. Curtis was born September 30, 1873, in Ogdensburg, New York. Her father was General Newton Martin Curtis and her mother was Emeline Clark Curtis. Curtis died October 6, 1944, in Richmond, Virginia. Curtis was known as a champion of education and training for Asian and African American library students through her work overseas and with the Hampton Institute Library School.

== Early life and career ==
Curtis attended Wells College from 1891 to 1894, and in 1898 received a diploma from the New York State Library School. Curtis held positions at a number of libraries from 1895 to 1908, and in 1908 became assistant professor at the University of Illinois at Urbana–Champaign. Curtis served there until 1920, and received an M.A. from the University of Minnesota in 1917. After 1920 Curtis served overseas as an instructor at the government preparatory school and the Honan Agricultural College in Kaifeng, China from 1920 to 1921, and then served at the Philippine Normal School in Manila from 1921 to 1922. Upon returning to the United States Curtis took a position as director of the Drexel Institute Library School.

== Hampton Institute ==
Curtis was named director of the new Hampton Institute Library School in 1925. The school was founded by the Carnegie Corporation of New York for the purpose of providing African Americans with training in librarianship. During her directorship Curtis influenced over 150 students, and assisted in the regional accreditation of many schools for African Americans, particularly in the southern United States. Curtis was a member of the Virginia Library Association and the National Association of Teachers in Colored Schools. Curtis was also a member of the American Library Association. Curtis served as director of Hampton Institute until 1939, when it closed due to lack of funding.

== Publications ==
- What the Convict Reads, 1912
- List of library reports and bulletins in the collection of the University of Illinois library school, 1912
- The Collection of Social Survey Material, 1915
- The Libraries of the American State and National Institutions for Delinquents, Dependents, and Defectives, 1918
- "The Contributions of the Library School to Negro Education," Library Journal, December 1, 1926.
- "Colored Librarians in Conference," Library Journal, April 15, 1927.
- "Librarianship as a Field for Negroes," Journal of Negro Education, January 1935.
- "Community Service of the Library School," Southern Workman, April 1938.
