= Cornelis van Tienhoven =

Cornelis van Tienhoven (c. 1601 Utrecht – 1656 New Amsterdam) was an official of New Amsterdam from 1638 to 1656, and one of the more prominent people in New Netherland. He served in the administrations of three governors: Wouter van Twiller, Willem Kieft, and Peter Stuyvesant. As provincial secretary and schout-fiscal, he was deeply involved in the administrative, legal, and financial activities of New Amsterdam. He was widely disliked, and contemporary descriptions of his character and behavior are unflattering.

Van Tienhoven, the son of Luyt (Lucas) Cornelisz van Tienhoven and Jannetje Adriaens de Haes, was born in Utrecht c. 1601. He arrived in New Amsterdam as a Dutch West India Company bookkeeper in 1633 on the same ship as the new director of the colony, Wouter van Twiller. He was appointed provincial secretary by Willem Kieft in 1638 and retained that title when Peter Stuyvesant replaced Kieft in 1647.

Van Tienhoven was a strong advocate for military action against the Munsee bands that lived near New Amsterdam. In 1640, he led a retaliatory raid against the Raritan after the theft of some pigs. Although he attempted to prevent unnecessary bloodshed, several Raritans were killed and the sachem's brother was brutally mutilated.

Van Tienhoven was culpable in the massacre of 80 Munsee refugees at Pavonia at the beginning of Kieft's War (1643–1645). Dutch explorer and patroon David Pieterszoon de Vries later included a description of the slaughter in his journal:

...infants were snatched from their mother's breasts, and cut to pieces in sight of their parents, and the pieces thrown into the fire and into the water; other sucklings were bound to boards, and cut and struck or bored through, and miserably massacred, so that a heart of stone would have been softened. Some were thrown into the river, and when the fathers and mothers endeavored to rescue them, the soldiers would not let them come ashore again, but caused both old and young to be drowned... Some came to our people on the farms with their hands cut off; others had their legs hacked off and some were holding their entrails in their arms.

A pamphlet published in Antwerp in 1649 described van Tienhoven as a "murderer, thief, cheat, whoremonger, and villain." The anonymous author wrote: "Those who he stings he laughs at, and while he flatters he bites." In Representation of New Netherland, Adriaen van der Donck claimed that van Tienhoven would dress as a "wilden" and have intimate relations with Indigenous women.

During the 1649 mission of van der Donck to the Netherlands to petition the States General for local governance, van Tienhoven went as the representative of Director Peter Stuyvesant to argue against it. The right to establish a local government, however, was granted, and van Tienhoven became New Amsterdam's first official schout-fiscael although he had acted in this capacity for many years.

Van Tienhoven married 16-year-old Rachel Vigne in New Amsterdam in 1639. In 1653, while in The Hague, van Tienhoven seduced a young woman named Liesbeth Croon. Van Tienhoven went to great lengths to keep the relationship a secret, but when the affair became known, he smuggled Liesbeth aboard ship and returned to New Amsterdam. Liesbeth is said to have only discovered that van Tienhoven was married with three children when his wife Rachel met the ship at the dock.

On September 15, 1655, while Director Stuyvesant and most of the garrison were on the Delaware River conquering New Sweden, New Amsterdam was occupied by several hundred Munsee warriors. They ransacked a few houses and threatened, kicked or beat some of the inhabitants. No deaths or serious injuries occurred. The sachems met with the town council and agreed to withdraw at sunset. Meanwhile, the council mustered the militia. As the Munsee gathered at the riverbank that evening, Henrick van Dyck, who may have triggered the occupation by killing a Munsee woman, was wounded in the chest by an arrow. Van Tienhoven urged the militia to open fire on the Munsee. In the ensuing skirmish, three Munsee and three inhabitants of New Amsterdam were killed. The Munsee immediately retaliated with attacks on Pavonia and Staten Island, resulting in many deaths. More than 100 colonists, mostly women and children, were taken captive but were subsequently ransomed.

In his report to the directors of the West India Company, Stuyvesant blamed "hot-headed individuals" for the attack. In a private letter, he advised the West India Company to discharge van Tienhoven because he "is so much hated."

Others were more blunt. Councillor Nicasius de Sille in a letter to Hans Bontemantel, a director of the West India Company wrote: "...the community and the householders who have sought refuge here, call for revenge and murder against the fiscal [van Tienhoven] and two or three others, whom they loudly proclaim by name to have been the only cause [of the attacks]."

The directors of the West India Company also concluded that van Tienhoven was to blame: "Whoever considers only his last transaction with the savages, will find, with clouded brains, filled with liquor, he was the prime cause of this dreadful massacre." In March 1656, the directors ordered Cornelis van Tienhoven and his brother Adrean dismissed due to "manifold complaints."

On November 18, 1656, van Tienhoven's hat and cane were found floating in the Hudson River. It is unknown if he drowned, was murdered by one of his enemies, or staged his disappearance to escape legal difficulty. At the time his wife was expecting another child. His younger brother, Adrian van Tienhoven, also vanished, but later reappeared in Barbados.
