= Allen W. Trelease =

American historian and professor (1928/29 – 2011)

Allen William Trelease
- Born: c. 1928/1929; Boulder, Colorado, U.S.
- Died: July 15, 2011 (aged 82–83); Greensboro, North Carolina, U.S.
- Other names: Allen Trelease
- Education: University of Illinois at Urbana-Champaign, Harvard University
- Occupation(s): Historian, author, professor

Allen William Trelease (c. 1928/1929–July 15, 2011) was an American historian, author, and professor. He served as the head of the history and government department at the University of North Carolina at Greensboro (UNC Greensboro), and as president of the Historical Society of North Carolina.

== Biography ==
Allen William Trelease was born c. 1928/1929 in Boulder, Colorado. Trelease's parents were Helen Waldo and William Trelease. The family moved often and he attended high school in Catonsville, Maryland. He graduated from the University of Illinois at Urbana-Champaign (A.B. 1950); and received a doctorate from Harvard University (Ph.D. 1955).

Trelease taught at Wells College in Aurora, New York, from 1955 to 1967. Followed by teaching history for 27 years at the University of North Carolina in Greensboro from 1967 until 1994. He also briefly served as Dean of Faulty and as the history and government department chair.

Trelease wrote the book, White Terror: the Ku Klux Klan Conspiracy and Southern Reconstruction (1971), about the Ku Klux Klan. He wrote entries for NCPedia, an encyclopedia published by the State Library of North Carolina.

He died on July 15, 2011, in Greensboro. A graduate fellowship at UNC Greensboro, the "Allen W. Trelease Graduate Fellowship in History" was named for him. The University of Minnesota libraries have a collection of his papers.

== Publications ==
- Trelease, Allen W. (1960). Indian Affairs in Colonial New York: The Seventeenth Century. Cornell University Press.
- Trelease, Allen W. (1968). United States Supreme Court Justices Their Personal Backgrounds 1789–1951 (thesis).
- Trelease, Allen W. (1971). Reconstruction: the Great Experiment. New York City: Harper & Row. ISBN 9780060261221.
- Trelease, Allen W. (1971). White Terror: the Ku Klux Klan Conspiracy and Southern Reconstruction. New York City: Harper and Row. ISBN 9780807119532. 42 editions since 1971
- Trelease, Allen W. (1991). The North Carolina Railroad, 1849–1871, and the Modernization of North Carolina. Fred W. Morrison Series in Southern Studies. University of North Carolina Press. ISBN 9780807819418.
- Trelease, Allen W. (1991). Changing Assignments: a Pictorial History of the University of North Carolina at Greensboro. University of North Carolina at Greensboro.
- Trelease, Allen W. (2004). Making North Carolina Literate: the University of North Carolina at Greensboro From Normal School to Metropolitan University. Carolina Academic Press. ISBN 9780890895238.
