= Edward French (professor) =

American lawyer, civil war veteran, and professor

Edward French was an American lawyer, civil war veteran, professor at Wells College, and early California pioneer. He was also a botanist by avocation.

French taught Latin, literature, chemistry and mathematics at Wells College, beginning in 1868, the year of its founding. He was induced to take a faculty position at Wells by his wife, Mary Wells French, to get her brother's new college up and running. His brother-in-law, Henry Wells, had by that point founded companies that would later become American Express and Wells Fargo.

In 1888, French decided to move the family to Southern California, part of "a mass migration to Southern California promoted by an aggressive publicity campaign orchestrated by Los Angeles boosters and driven by a fare-price war between the Southern Pacific and Santa Fe railroads." French bought a small fruit ranch in Glendale, but the ranch failed to prosper, their home fire, the business collapsed in the depression of 1893, and the ranch was foreclosed at auction.

French took a job teaching in the Los Angeles public schools. With failing health and cataracts, he lost the teaching job. He lived out his days in the Los Angeles Old Soldiers' Home as a resident employee, taking a clerical position in the records office.

== Family ==
Besides his connections to Henry Wells and her sister Mary Wells French, French was the son of Illinois governor Augustus C. French and Lucy Southwick French. He was the brother of Augusta French Wicker. He was the brother-in-law of railroad baron Cassius Milton Wicker, after Wicker's marriage to Augusta Carroll French (1849–1889).

Edward French was the father of two daughters: Helen and poet Nora May French.
