= Charles Herschel Sisam =

American mathematician

Charles Herschel Sisam (8 September 1879, Cedar Rapids, Iowa – 4 December 1964) was an American mathematician.

He received his B.A. in 1902 from the University of Michigan and then his M.A. in 1903 and Ph.D. in 1906, under the supervision of Virgil Snyder, from Cornell University. While working on his Ph.D., Sisam was a mathematics instructor at the United States Naval Academy from 1904 to 1906. He was an instructor in 1906–1907, a research associate in 1907–1909, and an assistant professor in 1909–1918 at the University of Illinois. From 1918 to 1948, he was a full-time professor at Colorado College. He did research on algebraic surfaces and was an invited speaker at the ICM in 1928 in Bologna. He was an editorial staff of the Transactions of the American Mathematical Society from 1930 to 1936.

Sisam married and was the father of a daughter.

== Selected publications ==
=== Articles ===
- Sisam, C. H. (1904). "On self-dual scrolls". Bulletin of the American Mathematical Society. 10 (9): 440–441. doi:10.1090/s0002-9904-1904-01140-4. MR 1558144.
- Sisam, C. H. (1909). "On Some Loci Associated with Plane Curves". American Journal of Mathematics. 31 (3): 253–262. doi:10.2307/2369930. JSTOR 2369930.
- Sisam, C. H. (1916). "On Sextic Surfaces Having a Nodal Curve of Order 8". American Journal of Mathematics. 38 (4): 373–386. doi:10.2307/2370344. JSTOR 2370344.
- Sisam, C. H. (1916). "On a configuration on certain surfaces". Bulletin of the American Mathematical Society. 22 (8): 381–383. doi:10.1090/s0002-9904-1916-02796-0. MR 1559805.
- Sisam, C. H. (1919). "On Surfaces Containing Two Pencils of Cubic Curves". American Journal of Mathematics. 41 (3): 212–224. doi:10.2307/2370333. JSTOR 2370333.
- Sisam, C. H. (1919). "On Surfaces Containing a System of Cubics that do not Constitute a Pencil". American Journal of Mathematics. 41 (1): 49–59. doi:10.2307/2370477. JSTOR 2370477.
- Sisam, Charles H. (1930). "On varieties of three dimensions with six right lines through each point". American Journal of Mathematics. 52 (3): 607–610. doi:10.2307/2370628. JSTOR 2370628.
- Sisam, C. H. (1934). "Resultants and Symmetric Functions". National Mathematics Magazine. 9 (2): 46–52. doi:10.2307/3028882. JSTOR 3028882.

=== Books ===
- On septic scrolls having a rectilinear directrix. The Lord Baltimore Press. 1907. (Ph.D. thesis, 1905)
- with Virgil Snyder: Analytic geometry of space. American mathematical series. H. Holt and company. 1914.
- Analytic geometry. 1936.
- College algebra. 1940.
- Introduction to college mathematics: a general introduction. 1946; xiii+561 pages
- Concise analytic geometry. 1946.
