= Otto Klemm =

German psychologist and philosopher (1884–1939)

Gustav Otto Klemm (8 March 1884 in Leipzig – 5 January 1939 in Leipzig) was a German psychologist and philosopher, as well as the first chair as Professor of Applied Psychology at the University of Leipzig. Klemm joined the Nazi Party in 1933.

While his psychological work is largely irrelevant today, Klemm is one of the best-known representatives of the Leipzig School of Gestalt psychology. His studies on human motor, which were carried out under his guidance, had scientific validity, both in terms of their findings as well as the careful methodology. He is next to Nikolai Alexandrovich Bernstein among the first researchers who have studied the phenomenon of variability of partial movements in relation to the stability of destinations and Final parameters systematically and extensively.
