= Ida Martha Metcalf =

Second American woman to receive a PhD in mathematics

- Born: September 26, 1857; Texas
- Died: October 24, 1952 (aged 95); Northampton, Massachusetts
- Education: Boston College; Cornell University
- Scientific career
- Fields: Mathematics
- Thesis: Geometric Duality in Space (1893)
- Doctoral advisor: James Edward Oliver

Ida Martha Metcalf (August 26, 1857 – October 24, 1952) was the second American woman to receive a PhD in mathematics.

== Early life ==
Ida Metcalf was born in Texas to Charles A. and Martha C. (Williams) Metcalf. During her youth, her family moved about the south. After her father’s death, she moved to New England with her mother and siblings. By 1870, she was living in Massachusetts, where she taught school for many years.

== Education ==
In 1883, Ida began studying at Boston University where she received a Bachelor’s in Philosophy (Ph.B.) in 1886. From 1888 to 1889, she was a graduate student at Cornell University, earning a master's degree in mathematics. After teaching at Bryn Mawr School in Baltimore, she returned to Cornell and receive her Ph.D. in 1893.

== Professional career ==
For many years after receiving her Ph.D., Ida taught high school and worked in several financial firms and as a Civil Service Examiner. In 1912, she became a statistician in the Department of Finance for New York City, where she remained until her retirement in 1921.

== Later years ==
After retirement, Ida continued to work intermittently as a Civil Service Examiner until 1939. Beginning with the onset of a serious illness in 1948, she lived in nursing homes until her death at the age of ninety-six.

== Theses ==
- 1886: The Origin and Development of Styles of Architecture PhB, Boston University.
- 1889: The Theory of Illumination by Reflected and Refracted Light Master's thesis, Cornell University.
- 1893: Geometric Duality in Space PhD dissertation, Cornell University (directed by James Edward Oliver).
