= Clarence Lemuel Elisha Moore =

American mathematician (1876–1931)

Clarence Lemuel Elisha Moore (12 May 1876, in Bainbridge, Ohio – 5 December 1931) was an American mathematics professor, specializing in algebraic geometry and Riemannian geometry. He is chiefly remembered for the memorial eponymous C. L. E. Moore instructorship at the Massachusetts Institute of Technology; this prestigious instructorship has produced many famous mathematicians, including four Fields Medal winners: Paul Cohen, Daniel Quillen, Curtis T. McMullen, and Akshay Venkatesh.

C. L. E. Moore received his B.Sc. from Ohio State University (1901) and then his A.M. (1902) and Ph.D. (1904) from Cornell University. His doctoral dissertation was entitled Classification of the surfaces of singularities of the quadratic spherical complex with Virgil Snyder as thesis advisor. Moore also studied geometry at the University of Göttingen, the University of Turin with Corrado Segre, and the University of Bonn with Eduard Study. In 1904, Moore joined the MIT mathematics department as an instructor and was successively promoted to assistant professor, associate professor, and full professor. In 1920, he was one of the founders of the MIT Journal of Mathematics and Physics. He remained at MIT until his death in 1931 following a surgical operation.

== Selected publications ==
- Moore, C. L. E. (July 1905). "Classification of the surfaces of singularities of the quadratic spherical complex". American Journal of Mathematics. 27 (3): 248–279. doi:10.2307/2370148. hdl:2027/miun.abn8053.0001.001. JSTOR 2370148.
- Moore, C. L. E. (1918). "Translation surfaces in hyperspace". Bulletin of the American Mathematical Society. 25 (2): 75–85. doi:10.1090/s0002-9904-1918-03151-0. MR 1560150.
- Moore, C. L. E. (1920). "Rotation surfaces of constant curvature in space of four dimensions". Bulletin of the American Mathematical Society. 26 (10): 454–460. doi:10.1090/s0002-9904-1920-03336-7. MR 1560336.
- Moore, C. L. E. (1921). "Note on minimal varieties in hyperspace". Bulletin of the American Mathematical Society. 27 (5): 211–216. doi:10.1090/s0002-9904-1921-03404-5. MR 1560401.
