= Wells College =

Private liberal arts college in Aurora, New York (1868–2024)

- Former name: Wells Seminary (1868–1870)
- Motto: Habere et Dispertire
- Motto in English: "To have and to share"
- Type: Private liberal arts college
- Active: 1868–2024
- Founder: Henry Wells
- Endowment: $28.8 million (2022)
- President: Susan Henking
- Faculty: 38 (2024–2024)
- Students: 357 (2024–2024)
- Location: Aurora, New York, United States; 42.7452°N 76.6980°W
- Campus: 127 acres (51 ha); Rural
- Colors: Red, white, and black
- Nickname: The Express
- Sporting affiliations: NCAA Division III – AMCC (2023–2024)
- Website: www.wells.edu
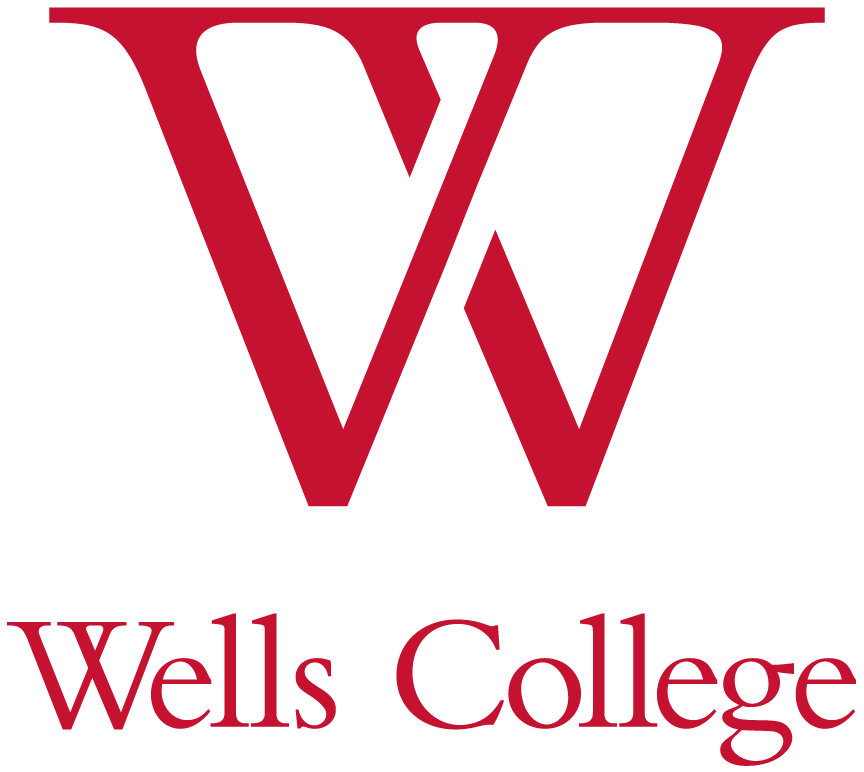

Wells College was a private liberal arts college in Aurora, New York, United States, until its closure in 2024. It was founded in 1868 as a women's college and became coeducational in 2005. The college's campus, set on the shore of Cayuga Lake, remains a part of the Aurora Village–Wells College Historic District and is listed on the National Register of Historic Places.

Henry Wells, a co-founder of both Wells Fargo & Company and American Express Company, established Wells College in 1868 as Wells Seminary, stating that the promotion of higher education for women was his life's dream. It ceased operations on June 30, 2024, with administrators citing financial challenges. In 2025, Hobart and William Smith Colleges were announced as Wells' legacy partner, who will maintain the closed college's records and endowment.

== History ==
=== Founding ===
Wells College was established by Henry Wells in 1868 as Wells Seminary, a women's college. Henry Wells was a co-founder of both Wells Fargo & Company and American Express Company, and he established the seminary in pursuit of promoting higher education for women, a goal which he called "the dream of my life". Wells, with support from benefactors including Edwin B. Morgan, founded the college on a plot of land adjacent to his villa, Glen Park, in Aurora, Cayuga County, New York; he also rejected an offer from Ezra Cornell to merge their two newly-established colleges. (Note: Ezra Cornell's college, in Ithaca, grew into what is now Cornell University, with which Wells College maintained an academic relationship.) In 1875, Wells stated in an address that he founded the college with the hope it would "always be conducted on truly Christian principles". On March 28, 1868, the college was incorporated by the New York State Legislature for the purpose of "promoting the higher education of young women in literature, science and the arts". In 1870, the seminary's name was changed to Wells College. Over its first ten years, the college's enrollment grew from 34 to 170 students.

=== Growth ===
Frances Folsom, born in Buffalo before attending Wells, graduated in 1885 and married then–U.S. President Grover Cleveland the next year, becoming at the time the youngest woman to serve as First Lady. During her time as a student at Wells, social codes regarding correspondence were strictly enforced; nonetheless, Cleveland had received permission to write her and did so to propose their romantic relationship. In 1887, she joined the college's board of trustees, and served in her position for over 50 years.

In August 1888, the college's main building was destroyed in a fire. Its replacement was planned by architect William Henry Miller and rebuilt over the two years following the fire.

An 1890 volume by W. T. Harris named nine women's colleges that offered an educational quality on par with coeducational and men's colleges; Wells was listed among them, alongside Bryn Mawr College, Elmira College, Ingham University, Mount Holyoke College, Rutgers Female College, Smith College, Vassar College, and Wellesley College.

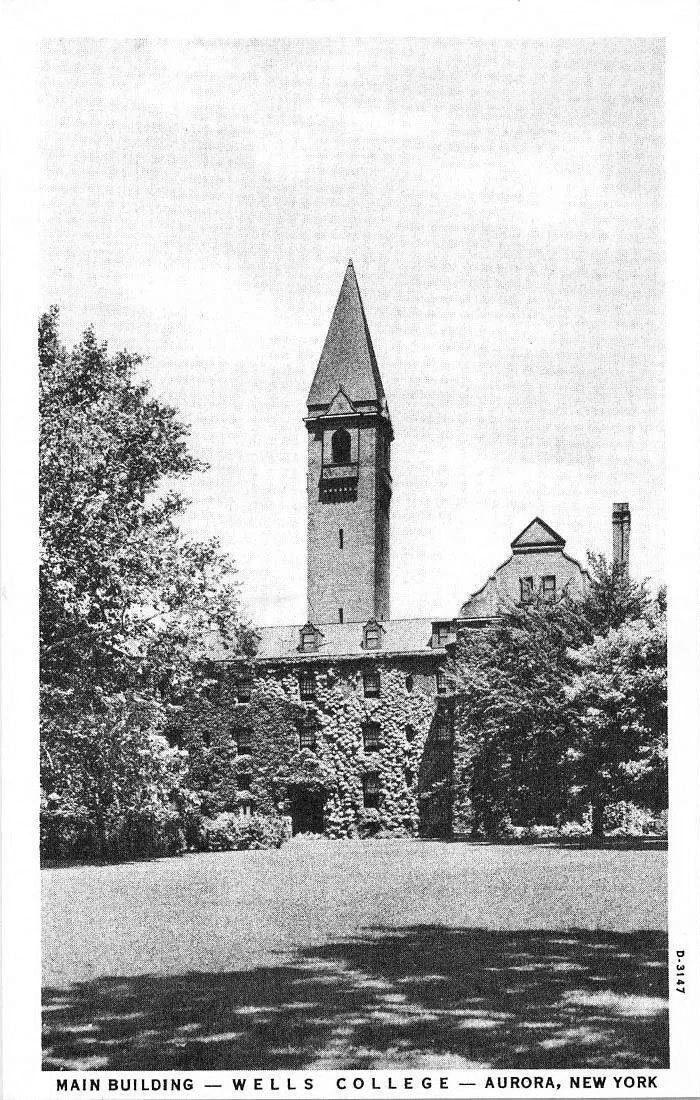
Wells College Main Building in 1936

In the mid-1960s, Wells College was included in the Finger Lakes Colleges Computing Center, later the Finger Lakes Area Computing Center, a computing center born out of a National Science Foundation grant awarded to Cornell University. The project utilized time-sharing of an IBM 360/67 between colleges and high schools in upstate New York, and, although the 360/67 system did not meet its high expectations, access to the computing center allowed Wells and the other member institutions to make progress on installing their own computing infrastructure.

=== Financial issues and closure ===
==== Coeducation ====
In October 2004, the Wells College board of trustees convened to consider changing the college to a coeducational institution. When the college's 18 trustees arrived on campus to deliberate, over 100 people staged a protest to block the paths and urge the trustees to vote against the change. The college stated that they were considering becoming coeducational to attract more students and combat "enrollment challenges" that posed a risk to the college's finances. After the board president announced on October 2 that Wells would become coeducational the following fall, over 100 students organized a sit-in to protest the resolution and the lack of student, alumni, and parent involvement in the decision. Multiple alumni, as well as students from other women's colleges, joined the multi-day sit-in, inspired by prior protests at Mills College. Despite the sit-in and letters from over a dozen parents, a university spokesperson stated later in the month that the board would not reconsider its position on the matter.

After the board reaffirmed its decision to move ahead with coeducation, students filed a lawsuit against the college, which the courts rejected. A judge refusing to block the transition stated he chose not to "second-guess" the trustees' decision and did not want to be responsible for any "annihilation" of the college. According to the Associated Press, "several" students chose to transfer following the decision.

It was projected in May 2005 that the "inaugural coed class will include at least 21 males". In the fall of 2005, campus enrollment was made up of 383 women and 33 men, for a total of 416. The Post-Standard reported on the first day of classes that Wells opened "without problems". By 2007, Wells' total enrollment had grown to 574, of which approximately 75 percent were female.

==== Closure ====
In June 2019, Wells College's accreditor, the Middle States Commission on Higher Education (MSCHE), placed the college on probation for its "[inability] to demonstrate compliance with the Commission’s standards for accreditation and requirements of affiliation". The college's accreditation had last been reaffirmed in 2014, but in their 2019 report the MSCHE stated that Wells' accreditation was in jeopardy for providing "insufficient evidence" for their compliance with the "Planning, Resources, and Institutional Improvement" standard.

In May 2020, the president of Wells College, Jonathan Gibralter, sent a series of letters to the students, faculty, and staff members of the college, warning the community that financial issues related to the COVID-19 pandemic threatened the college's future. He wrote: "If New York State continues its mandate that our campus remain closed through all or part of the [2020] fall semester, Wells simply will not receive enough revenue to continue operations." Additionally, with about 15% of Wells' operating revenue coming from the study abroad program in Florence, Italy, that it administered, COVID-19 travel restrictions cut off a portion of the college's revenue. The college, at the time, enrolled 414 students.

In June 2021, Wells' accreditation was reaffirmed by the MSCHE. A year later, an auditor's report said that on June 30, 2022, Wells College's endowment totaled a value of 28.8 million dollars. Its enrollment that school year was 342 students.

When upstate New York private colleges Cazenovia College and Medaille University both closed in 2023, Wells became a teach-out partner, accepting transfer students from the two institutions in an effort to allow them to complete their studies.

In April 2024, the college's president and board chair announced that the Wells would close at the end of the spring 2024 semester due to "financial challenges ... exacerbated by a global pandemic, a shrinking pool of undergraduate students nationwide, inflationary pressures, and an overall negative sentiment towards higher education". The public announcement, posted April 29, stated that the college would close at the end of the spring semester. In 2023–2024, the college's final academic year, Wells enrolled 357 students and employed 38 faculty members. (Note: A student–faculty ratio of approximately 9:1.)

On June 20, 2024, college president Jonathan Gibralter left the institution. On June 30, the same day its accreditation expired, Wells College ceased its operations and closed. The Post-Standard summarized the closure reasons as "the college ran out of students and money". The New York State Department of Labor announced that 141 workers of the college's 165 total employees would be affected by worker adjustment and retraining. On July 1, Susan Henking was appointed president to oversee the closure.

=== Legacy ===
While it was originally announced alongside the closure itself that Manhattanville University in Purchase, New York, would maintain the college's transcripts, business records, and other important artifacts, in June 2025 the Wells College Board of Trustees entered into a legacy agreement with Hobart and William Smith Colleges in nearby Geneva, New York. As part of that agreement, books, records and other items from Wells College would be held at Hobart and William Smith, artworks would be transferred, and greenspace would be named in honor of the former college.

In January 2026, the Wells College Board of Trustees accepted a bid from the Hiawatha Institute for Indigenous Knowledge to purchase the college's campus for $12.5 million. The Hiawatha Institute intended to establish a two-year tribal college using approximately 20% of the campus and to lease the remainder as apartments or commercial space to generate revenue. However, that deal fell through and purchase agreement was signed with a Chicago-based real estate developer for $10 million in November 2026.

== Academics ==
Wells College students had the option to cross-register for classes at other institutions as part of an inter-college exchange program. Wells' partners in the program were Cornell University, Ithaca College, and Cayuga Community College. In its 2024 rankings, U.S. News & World Report ranked Wells at 146th among national liberal arts colleges.

Wells College had several study abroad programs, most notably in Florence, Italy. It had also created centers in sustainability, business and entrepreneurship, and book arts.

Wells had an honor code to which all students subscribed. By signing the Honor Code, Wells students pledged "not to lie, cheat, steal, deceive, or conceal in the conduct of their collegiate life". Wells allowed students to have take-home exams and to work in their residence hall rooms, at the library, or on the dock by the lake, rather than only in classrooms.

== Athletics ==
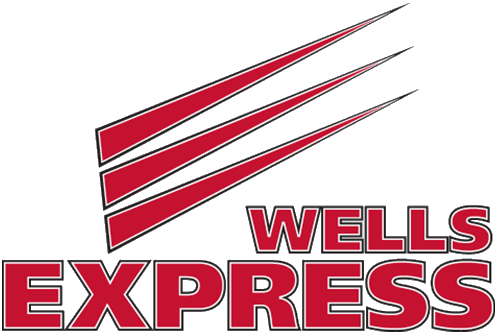
Wells athletics logo

Wells College, nicknamed The Express, competed as a member of the National Collegiate Athletic Association at the Division III level. Their school colors were red, white, and black. Historically, cardinal and scarlet were used as specific shades of red for Wells' academic costume.

As a member of the Private College Athletic Conference throughout the late 1970s and early 1980s, the Express sports teams of the college captured four consecutive conference championships in women's tennis (1977–78, 1978–79, 1979–80, 1980–81). They also won titles in women's bowling (1978–79, 1979–80). Wells, which officially became an NCAA Division III institution prior to the 1986–87 athletic season, joined the Atlantic Women's Colleges Conference (AWCC) prior to the 1996–97 athletic season. In 1996, the Wells women's soccer team captured the school's only AWCC championship title. At the time, Wells offered six intercollegiate athletic sports: field hockey, softball, women's lacrosse, women's soccer, women's swimming and women's tennis.

In 2005, as part of the Board of Trustees' decision to accept men to the traditionally all-women's college, Wells incorporated men's soccer, men's swimming, and men's and women's cross country into their athletic cadre.

Prior to the 2007–08 academic year, the Express teams were invited to join the North Eastern Athletic Conference (NEAC) and compete against 14 other schools in the East Region. In joining the NEAC, Wells competed for conference championships and the opportunity to receive an automatic qualifier to participate in the NCAA tournament in select sports. Ultimately, Wells captured six conference championships in the NEAC. Men's swimming won the first league title in 2009–10, and earned a second title in 2012–13. Women's swimming have won three consecutive conference championships, during the 2011–12, 2012–13, and 2013–14 seasons. Men's basketball won the NEAC championship in 2010–11 and was the first team from Wells to participate in the NCAA Tournament.

In the 2018–19 season, the Wells men's volleyball team made it to the Elite 8 (Quarterfinals) in the NCAA Division III Men's Volleyball Tournament before falling to Stevens Institute of Technology. In the 2019–20 season, the Wells College women's swim team won first place in the NEAC swimming championships. In 2021, the NEAC rebranded and became the United East Conference. For the next two athletic seasons, Wells was a member of the United East. In 2022, the Allegheny Mountain Collegiate Conference and Wells announced the Express would become full-time members at the start of the 2023–24 school year.

As of the 2021–22 athletic season, Wells offered 15 NCAA Division III varsity sports, including field hockey, men's and women's basketball, men's and women's lacrosse, men's and women's soccer, men's and women's swimming, men's and women's volleyball, men's and women's cross country, softball, and baseball. Athletics were offered with half a PE (physical education) credit earned for each season completed.

On April 29, 2024 the college announced its closure. Despite the uncertain time, Wells athletics had a successful spring season in their lone season in the AMCC. The baseball team finished with a 19–18 overall record, while just missing the AMCC tournament by a game. The women's lacrosse team capped off the final season in program history winning the AMCC championship and regular-season title. The Express finished the season 16–1 overall and 6–0 in conference play. Wells hosted the semifinals and championship rounds. On May 4, the Express defeated Mt. Aloysius to win the AMCC title by a score of 19–6 in what was the final sporting event in Wells College history. Despite winning their conference tournament, the Express did not get a bid to the NCAA Division III Women's Lacrosse Tournament; the AMCC was not an automatic qualifying conference, because it had only four teams competing. Between the baseball and women's lacrosse teams, the Express accumulated a plethora of all-conference selections during the final spring 2024 season.

== Campus ==
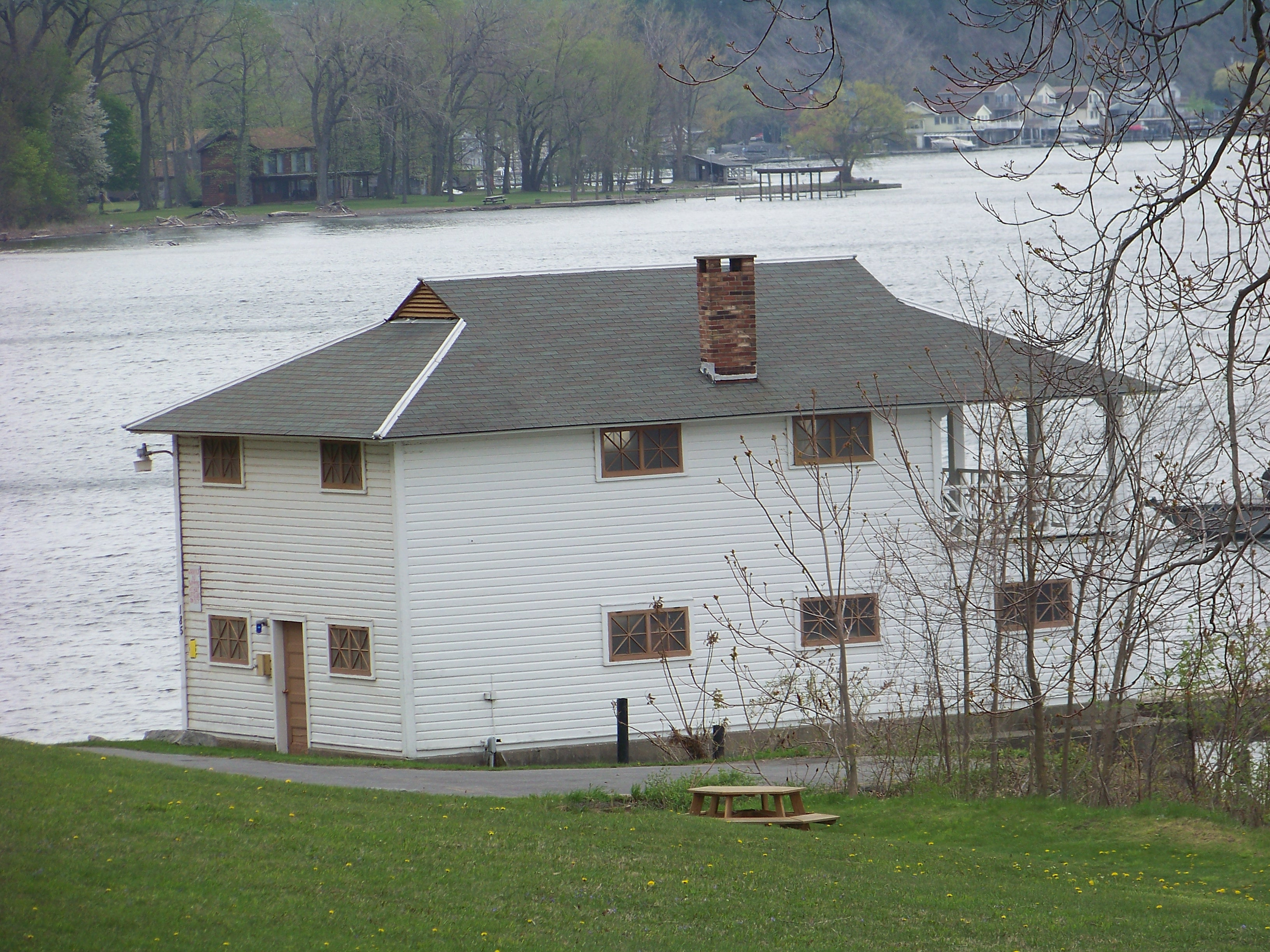
Wells College Boathouse on Cayuga Lake

The campus of Wells College spanned 127 acres (Note: Some sources report the campus size as 300 acres or more.) in the rural setting of Aurora, a village in Cayuga County, New York, on the eastern shore of Cayuga Lake, one of the Finger Lakes.

The Louis Jefferson Long Library on the Wells College campus was completed in 1968 and had been designed by Walter Netsch, an example of a building employing his architectural Field Theory. Netsch was a member of the architecture firm SOM, which also designed the Barler Music Hall and Campbell Art Building.

== Leadership ==
=== Deans ===
- Helen Fairchild Smith (1894–1905)

=== Presidents ===
- Thomas J. Preston, Jr. (1912; pro temp) – married Frances Folsom Cleveland, widow of Grover Cleveland
- John Delane Wilson (1968–1975)
- Frances "Sissy" Farenthold (1976–1980)
- Patti McGill Peterson (1980–1987)
- Irene W.D. Hecht (1991)
- Robert A. Plane (1991–1995)
- Lisa Marsh Ryerson (1995–2013)
- Thomas E. J. de Witt (2013–2015; interim)
- Jonathan Gibralter (2015–2024)
- Susan Henking (2024–present)

== Notable alumni ==
- Helen Barolini, author of novels and essays
- Mary Beckerle, executive director of the Huntsman Cancer Institute; a fellow of the American Academy of Arts and Sciences
- Frances R. Brown, college dean and president
- Frances Folsom Cleveland (1885), wife of President Grover Cleveland and First Lady of the United States
- Kate Clugston, writer
- Emily M. J. Cooley, religious and temperance leader
- Emma Lampert Cooper, painting
- Florence Ledyard Cross Kitchelt (1897), suffragist, socialist, and social worker
- Florence Rising Curtis, library educator
- Ewa Deelman, computer scientist
- Alana DiMario, politician
- Pauline Dunwell Partridge, writer
- Carolyn Elkins, poet
- Carol Bernstein Ferry, philanthropist
- Edith Kinney Gaylord (1939), journalist and former president of the National Women's Press Club
- Lucia Albino Gilbert, psychologist
- Millicent Hathaway, chemist
- Lynne Huffer, professor
- Ann Hughes, politician
- Kelly Kadera, professor
- Helen Tracy Lowe-Porter, translator of Thomas Mann's works
- Lisa Marsh Ryerson (1981), president of Wells College and Southern New Hampshire University
- Kati Marton, author and journalist
- Louise Murray, historian
- Laura Nader (1952), Professor of Anthropology at the University of California, Berkeley
- Margaret Pericak-Vance, human geneticist professor
- Ann Pfau, jurist
- Lina Puerta, mixed media artist
- Elsa Rehmann, landscape architect
- Persis Robertson, painter and printmaker
- Pleasant Rowland (1962), founder of Pleasant Company and creator of the American Girl brand of dolls and books
- Grace Carew Sheldon (1875), journalist, author, editor, businesswoman
- Liesel Moak Skorpen, children's author
- Helen Stern, sculptor
- Nelle Swartz (1904), labor official
- Kathryn Walker, actress
- Mildred Walker, novelist
- Faith Whittlesey (1960), politician, US Ambassador to Switzerland
- Helena Zachos (1875), faculty member at Cooper Union

== Notable faculty ==
- Jesse Bering – psychologist
- Robert P. T. Coffin – poet
- Nancy Cole (1931–1932) – mathematician
- Edward French (1868–1888) – professor of Latin, literature, chemistry and mathematics. Brother-in-law of Henry Wells.
- John D. Graham (1932) – painter
- Emily Ray Gregory (1901–1909) – zoologist
- Victor Hammer (1939–1948) – artist
- Robert Hammond (1967–1968) – professor of French literature and cinema
- Esther Violet Hansen (1924–1930) – classical scholar who specialized in the Kingdom of Pergamon
- Paul Hindemith – composer and violist
- R. Joseph Hoffmann (2006) – historian of religion, humanist activist
- Temple Rice Hollcroft (1918–1954) – mathematician
- May Lansfield Keller (1904–1906) – professor of German
- Paul Henry Lang (1932–1934) – musicologist and conductor
- J. J. Lankes (1933–1941) – artist
- Thelma Zeno Lavine (1941–1943) – philosopher
- Lillian Rosanoff Lieber (1917–1918) – mathematician and author, taught physics at Wells
- Louise Ropes Loomis (1921–1940) – historian, translator, editor
- Annie MacKinnon (1896–1901) – mathematician and third woman to earn a mathematics doctorate at an American university
- William Matthews – poet
- Alexander Gordon McKay (1949–1950) – Canadian academic who specialized in Vergilian studies
- Arthur Mizener – English professor
- Ethel Isabel Moody (1927–1928) – Class of 1926, mathematician
- Nicholas Nabokov (1936–1941) – composer
- Helen Brewster Owens (1915–1917) – mathematician
- Myra Reynolds (1880–1882) – English professor
- William Stokoe (1946–1955) – English professor
- Allen W. Trelease (1955–1967) – history professor
- Mildred Walker (1955–1968) – novelist
- Margaret Floy Washburn (1894–1900) – psychologist
- Emil Carl Wilm (1912–1914) – philosopher and psychologist

== See also ==
- List of defunct colleges and universities in New York
