= Virgil Snyder =

American mathematician (1869–1950)

- Born: 1869; Dixon, Iowa
- Died: 1950 (aged 80–81)
- Education: Iowa State College; Cornell University; University of Göttingen
- Occupation: Mathematician
- Known for: President American Mathematical Society

Virgil Snyder (1869–1950) was an American mathematician, specializing in algebraic geometry.

Snyder was born in Dixon, Iowa. In 1886, he matriculated at Iowa State College and graduated with a bachelor's degree in 1889. He attended Cornell University as a graduate student from 1890 to 1892, leaving to study mathematics in Germany on an Erastus W. Brooks fellowship. In 1895, he received a doctorate from the University of Göttingen under Felix Klein. In 1895, Snyder returned to Cornell as an instructor, becoming an assistant professor in 1905 and a full professor in 1910. In 1938, he retired as professor emeritus, having supervised 39 doctoral students, 13 of whom were women. Of these students, perhaps the most well known is C. L. E. Moore. Snyder served as president of the American Mathematical Society for a two-year term in 1927 and 1928.

He was an Invited Speaker of the International Congress of Mathematicians in 1928 at Bologna, in 1932 at Zurich, and in 1936 at Oslo.

Snyder did research on configurations of ruled surfaces and Cremona and birational transformations.

== Selected works ==
- With Charles H. Sisam: Analytic geometry of space. American mathematical series. New York: H. Holt & Co. 1914.
