= North Hudson, New Jersey =

Populated place in Hudson County, New Jersey, US

Coordinates: 40.7827°N 74.0150°W

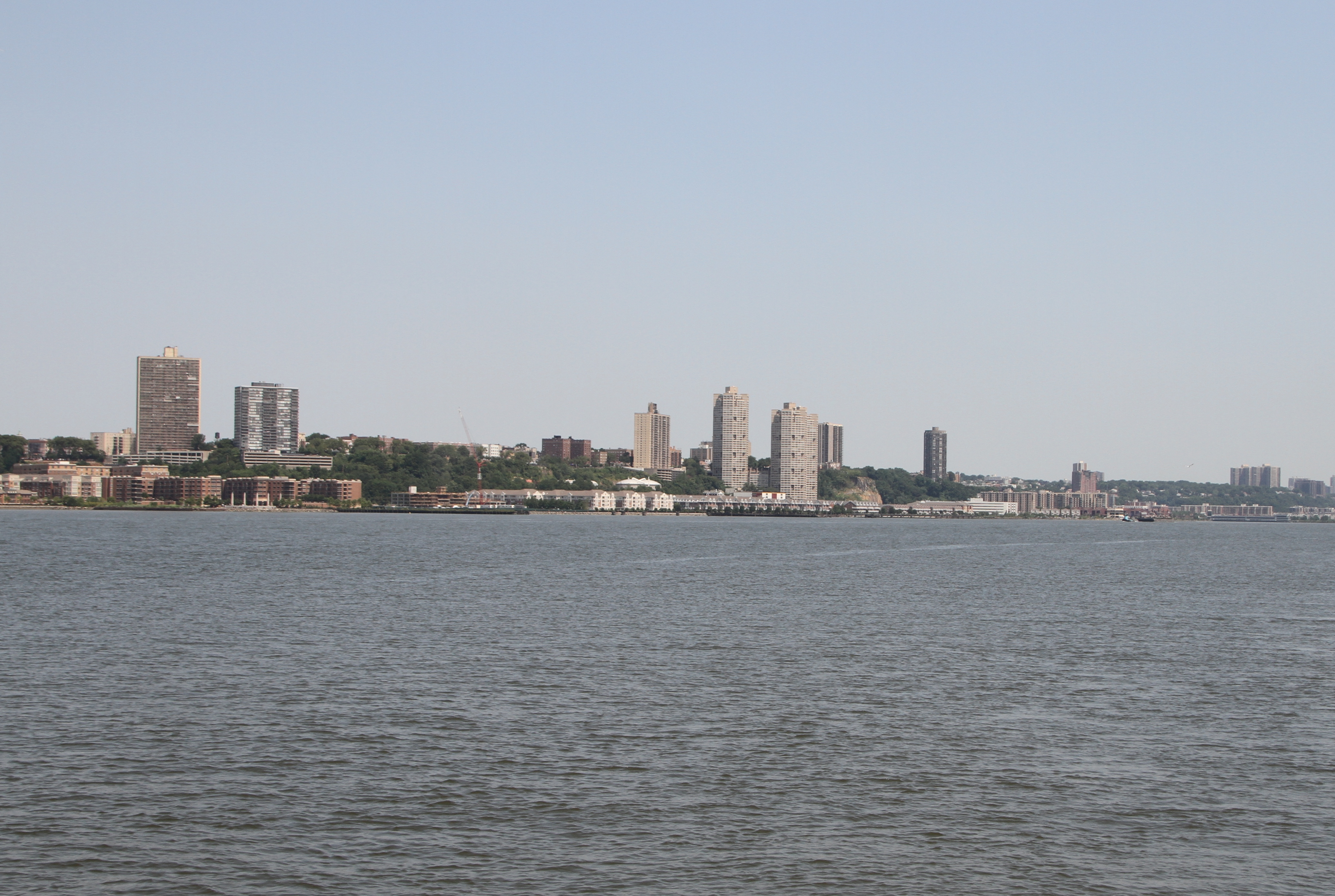
West New York, Guttenberg, North Bergen, and several of the tallest buildings in North Hudson seen from the Hudson River in July 2012

North Hudson is the area in the northern part of Hudson County, New Jersey, situated on the west bank of the Hudson River, mostly atop the Hudson Palisades. It comprises Weehawken, Union City, West New York, Guttenberg, and North Bergen.

With a combined population of approximately 206,000 according to 2022 estimates, the municipalities are among the most densely populated in the United States. Some have large proportions of foreign-born residents and majority-Hispanic populations. In all of the five towns except Weehawken, large percentages of the population speak a language other than English.

The towns and adjacent areas have been known as "The Home of the American Embroidery Industry", the silk center of the nation, and "Havana on the Hudson".

== Use of the name ==
The collective name for the municipalities of North Hudson has been used for various agencies, institutions, and organizations.

Area authorities that serve its transportation, health, and recreational needs include the North Hudson County Railway (c. 1865), North Hudson Hospital (c. 1900), and North Hudson Park (c.1908) and the Hoboken-North Hudson YMCA (c. 1929).

Public services in the region include the North Hudson Regional Fire and Rescue, founded in 1998 when municipal services were merged, and the North Hudson Sewerage Authority, which serves Hoboken, Union City, Weehawken, and West New York.

Hudson County Community College offers some classes on its North Hudson Campus, Other educational facilities bearing the name include the North Hudson Islamic Educational Center and the North Hudson Academy.

The North Hudson Community Action Corporation (1965) and the North Hudson Regional Council of Mayors are organizations offering social services to the area.

In the late 2000s, North Hudson came to be dubbed "NoHu" within certain communities a name used for a film festival founded in 2008.

== Geography and demographics ==
=== Population ===
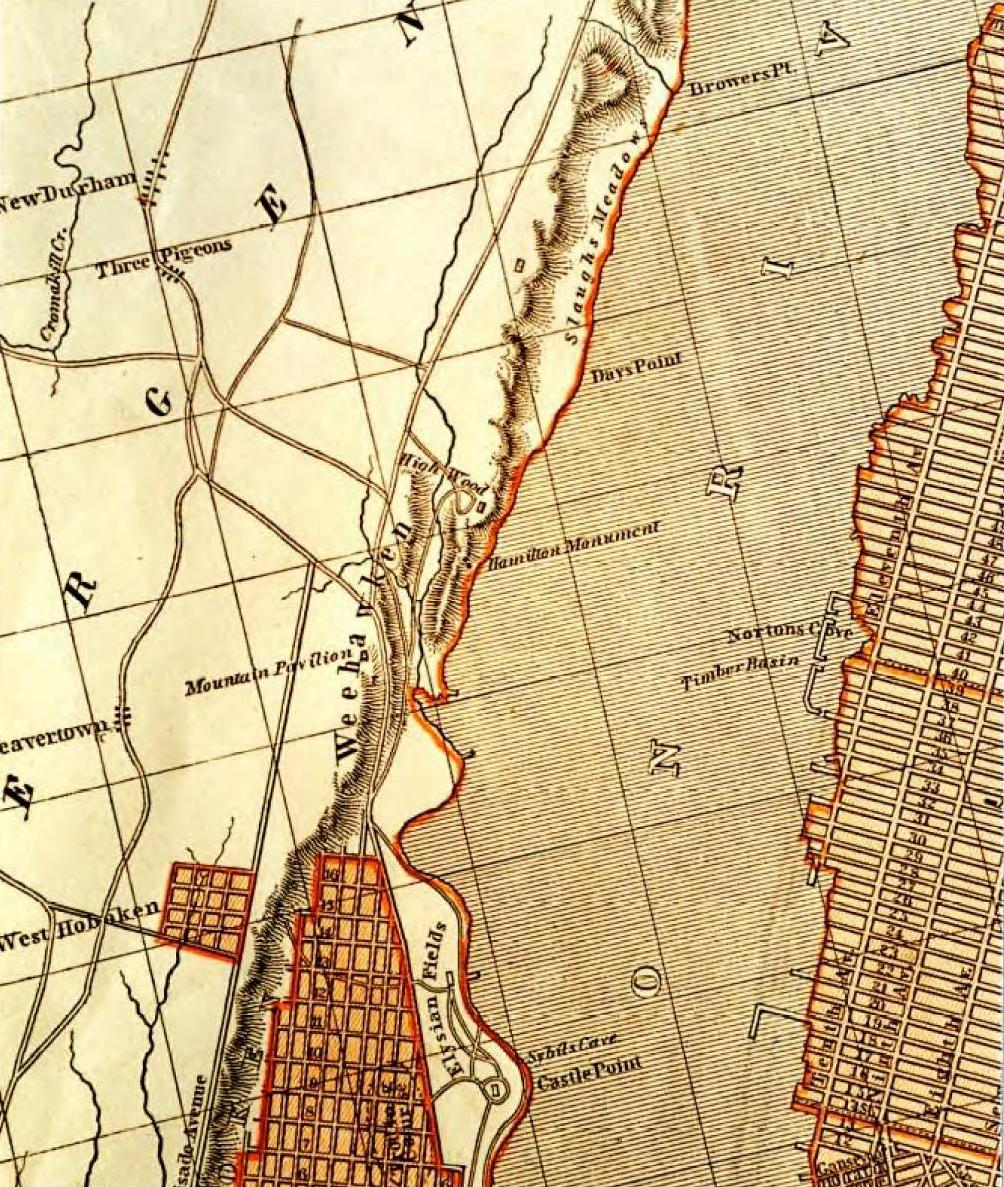
An 1841 map shows the area as being part of Bergen and still very rural.

By 1947, one estimate put the population of North Hudson at 175,000.

According to the United States Census Bureau's Population Estimates Program, as of July 2022, Hudson County had a population of 703,366, of which 206,243 were in North Hudson: Guttenberg (11,446), North Bergen (60,235), Union City (65,366), Weehawken (17,215) and West New York (51,981).

The municipalities are among the most densely populated in the United States. Guttenberg the most densely populated incorporated municipality in the United States, as well as one of the most densely populated municipalities worldwide, with 57,116 people per square mile (22,053 people/km^{2}) of land area. Of municipalities with over 50,000 people, Union City is the most densely populated city in the United States. North Hudson municipalities have one of the nation's largest proportions of foreign-born residents, and some also have a majority-Hispanic population.

=== Description ===
Mostly situated atop the Palisades on the Hudson Waterfront on the west bank of the Hudson River, the area is directly across from Midtown Manhattan and the Upper West Side in New York City, north of Hoboken and Jersey City (the county seat), and east of the New Jersey Meadowlands. Its high elevation allows North Hudson expansive views of the Manhattan skyline, the Meadowlands, and the Watchung Mountains. The cuesta, or slope, on the west side of area makes North Bergen the city with the second most hills per square mile in the United States after San Francisco.

The Hudson River Waterfront Walkway is a promenade and park along the river.

=== Boundaries ===
North Hudson lies north of Bergen, one of earliest settlements in New Jersey, founded in 1660. During the British and colonial it was known as Bergen Woods and was in the southeastern part of Bergen County. On February 22, 1838, Jersey City was incorporated as a separate municipality, In 1840 Hudson County, comprising Jersey City and Bergen Township, was created from the southern portion of Bergen County. North Bergen was incorporated as a township on April 10, 1843, by an act of the New Jersey Legislature, from the northern portion of Bergen Township. At the time, the town included everything east of the Hackensack River and north of and including what is now Jersey City Heights.

North Hudson experienced massive immigration and urbanization during the latter half of the 19th century, and led to the creation of various new towns. Portions of the North Bergen were taken to form Hoboken Township (April 9, 1849, now the City of Hoboken), Hudson Town (April 12, 1852, later part of Hudson City), Hudson City (April 11, 1855, later merged with Jersey City), Guttenberg (formed within the township on March 9, 1859, and set off as an independent municipality on April 1, 1878), Weehawken (March 15, 1859), Union Township and West Hoboken Township (both created on February 28, 1861), Union Hill town (March 29, 1864) and Secaucus (March 12, 1900).

In the early 1900s the idea of the all towns consolidating emerged and subsided, Eventually West Hoboken and Union Hill merged in 1925. Though each municipality has an independent local government and school district, they collaborate (sometimes with Hoboken) on certain services including fire-fighting, water supply, sewage treatment emergency medical services, and vocational education. Some are members of Bridging Communities, Connecting Library Services.

North Hudson is part of New Jersey's 32nd and 33rd legislative districts. Most of North Hudson falls within New Jersey's 8th congressional district.

== History ==
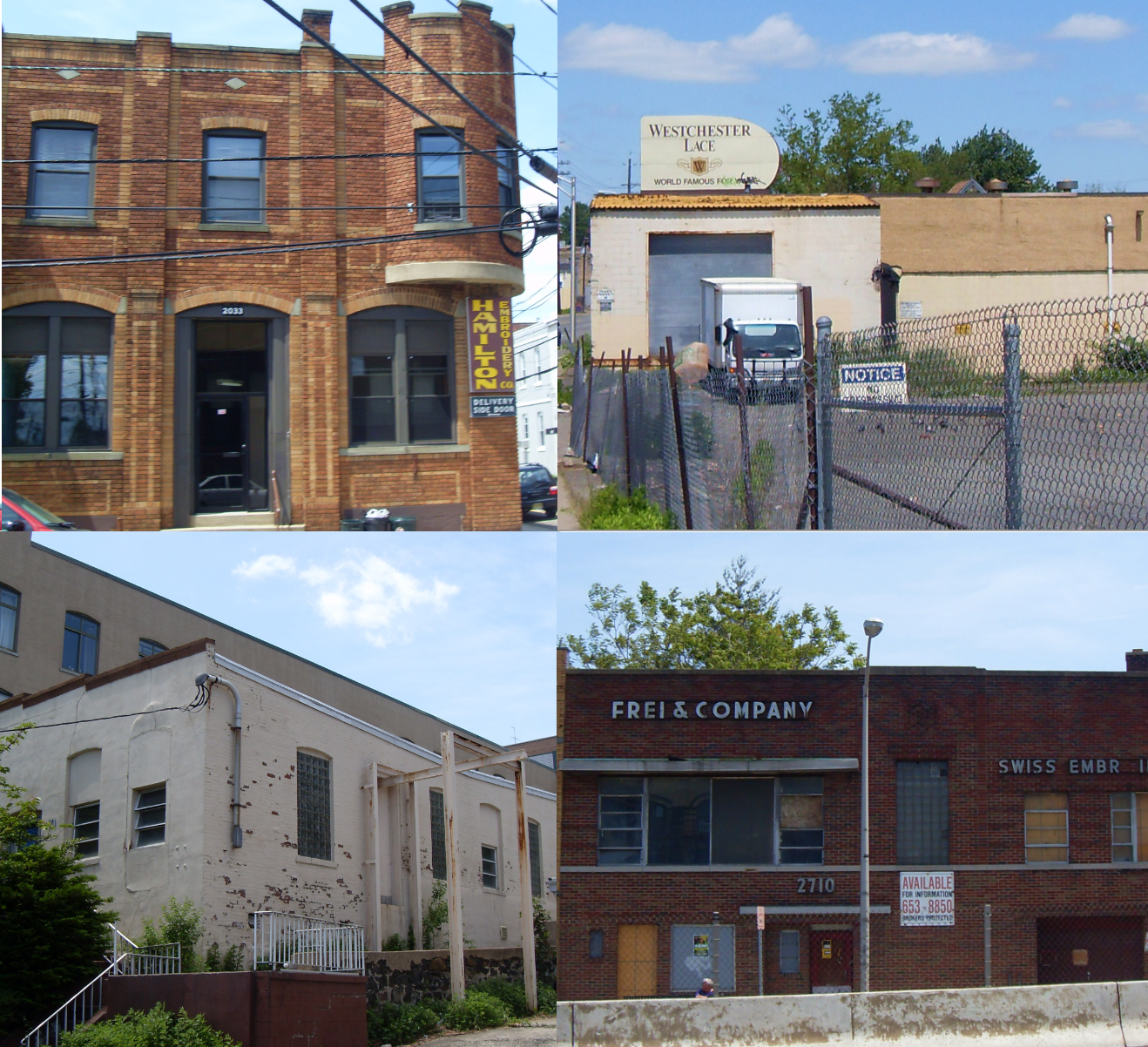
Embroidery shops in North Hudson

The area of what is today North Hudson County was originally inhabited by the Munsee-speaking branch of Lenape Native Americans, who wandered into the vast woodland area encountered by Henry Hudson during the voyages he conducted from 1609 to 1610 for the Dutch, who later claimed the area (which included the future New York City) and named it New Netherland. The portion of that land that included the future Hudson County was purchased from members of the Hackensack tribe of the Lenni-Lenape and became part of Pavonia, New Netherland.

The relationship between the early Dutch settlers and Native Americans was marked by frequent armed conflict over land claims. In 1658 by New Netherland colony Director-General Peter Stuyvesant re-purchased the territory. The boundaries of the purchase are described in the deed preserved in the New York State Archives, as well as the medium of exchange: "80 fathoms of wampum, 20 fathoms of cloth, 12 brass kettles, 6 guns, one double brass kettle, 2 blankets, and one half barrel of strong beer." In 1660, he ordered the building of a fortified village at Bergen to protect the area. It was the first permanent European settlement in New Jersey, located in what is now the Journal Square area of Jersey City near Academy Street. In 1664, the British captured New Netherland from the Dutch, at which point the boundaries of Bergen Township encompassed what is now known as Hudson County. North of this was the unpopulated Bergen Woods, which would later be claimed by settlers, after whom a number of Union City streets today are named,

Like most of the New York metropolitan area, North Hudson experienced waves of immigration, specifically: settlers from the Netherlands, British colonialists, German-speaking farmers and entrepreneurs, Irish fleeing the famine, "Ellis Islanders", World Wars refugees, the "Spanish" (initially Cuban immigrants, and later other South and Central Americans), and most recently, so-called "cosmopolitans" including individuals and childless families, yuppies, retirees, gay men and women, newlyweds, house-sharers, and rent refugees from less gentrified areas.

In the mid-19th century and early 20th century German Americans dominated the area. They, along with Swiss and Austrian immigrants, imported machines and founded the Schiffli lace making industries, for which they were famous, and the region became the "embroidery capitol of the United States", as well as the silk center of the nation.

Many of the factory buildings still house clothing manufacturers, while others have been converted to art studios or housing. It was this community who (in 1915) established what has become longest running passion play in the U.S., creating America's Oberammergau. The German-American Volksfest has taken place annually since 1874 at Schuetzen Park.

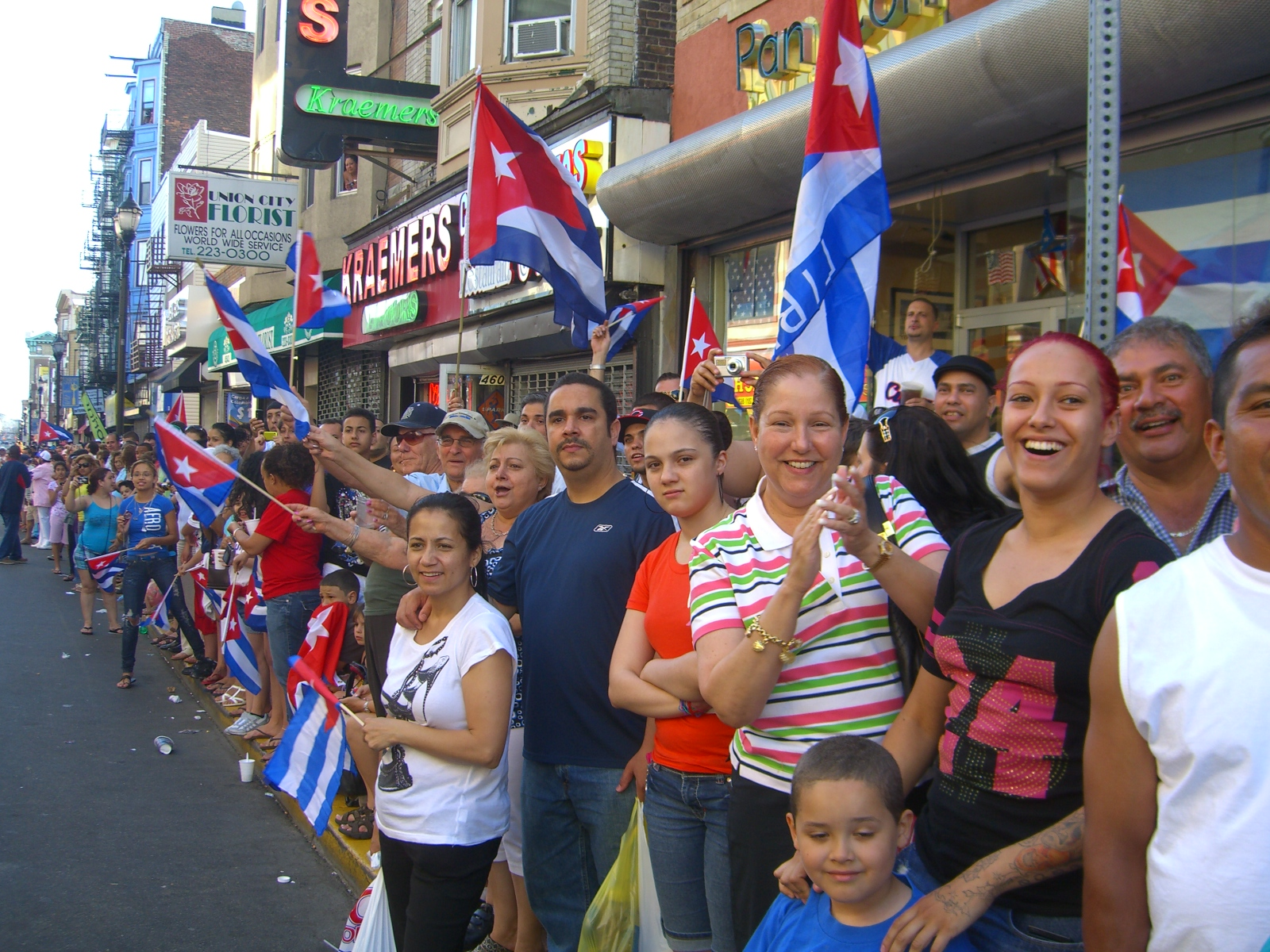
North Hudson is home to a large Cuban American population

In the 1960s and 1970s the some residents left for the suburbs. Simultaneously middle-class and professional Cubans, fleeing the revolution in their home country, re-located to the area and are generally considered to have "saved" it from a devastating downward spiral, leading to the nickname "Havana on the Hudson". North Hudson has the second largest Cuban American population in the United States behind Miami. Since its inception in 2000 the Cuban Day Parade of New Jersey has become a major annual event in North Hudson, beginning in North Bergen and traveling south to its end in Union City.

Once home to a large Jewish community that declined, the area's Jewish population has been on the rise since the turn of the current millennium.

== Transportation ==
The narrow waterfront at the base of the Palisades (along with Hoboken, Jersey City, Bayonne, and Edgewater) was an integral part of Port of New York and New Jersey's shipping industry. Rail lines under and on both sides of the Palisades were laid. From its terminal in Weehawken the West Shore Railroad operated long-distance and commuter passenger train and ferry service (used by travellers and locals alike), from 1884 to 1959.

North Hudson County Railway developed an extensive network of horse-drawn railroads and later, streetcars.

NY Waterway re-instituted ferry service in the late 1980s, and in 2006 opened a state-of-art terminal on the Waterfront for boats traversing the Hudson to Lower and Midtown Manhattan. The Hudson-Bergen Light Rail opened in the early 2000s connecting to south Hudson, has stations at Tonnelle Avenue, Bergenline Avenue, Port Imperial and Lincoln Harbor.

New Jersey Transit, since its opening, has promoted Bergenline Station as a hub/transfer between the light rail and buses: 22, 84, 86, 89, 156, 159, 181 and (one block west on JFK Boulevard) 88, 154. Nungessers at the Bergen County line is a major origination and transfer point. Transfer Station, Hudson County is also a transit hub. Manhattan and suburban-bound bus service is provided along Boulevard East, Bergenline Avenue, Kennedy Boulevard, and 32nd Street. Additionally there are many privately operated licensed mini-buses locally known as immi-vans, gua-guas, carritos, or dollar buses along Bergenline to Journal Square, Downtown Jersey City, 42nd Street in Manhattan, and south east Bergen County, and Paterson.

== See also ==
- Pavonia, New Netherlands
- Bergen, New Netherlands
- Bergen Township
- County Route 505 (New Jersey)
- Hudson River Waterfront Walkway
- Hudson Parks
- List of tallest buildings in North Hudson
- Galaxy Towers
- WOR TV Tower
- Stonehenge (building)
- Neighborhoods in Hudson
- Susquehanna Transfer (NYS&W station)
- Union Township
- West Hudson, New Jersey
