= Stonehenge (building) =

The Stonehenge
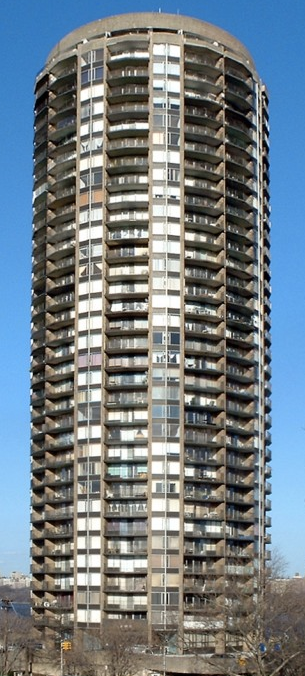

General information
- Type: Residential
- Location: Boulevard East; North Bergen, New Jersey
- Coordinates: 40.7995°N 73.9962°W
- Completed: 1967
- Opening: 1967
- Operator: Millstein Properties

Height
- Roof: 369 feet (112 m)

Technical details
- Floor count: 34
- Lifts/elevators: 2

Design and construction
- Architect: Shreve, Lamb and Harmon

Website
- www.thestonehengeapts.com

The Stonehenge is a residential apartment building on Boulevard East in the Woodcliff section of North Bergen, New Jersey, in the United States. Situated adjacent to North Hudson Park, the building was constructed in 1967 during a high-rise building spree and is among the tallest buildings in the area at a height of 369 feet (112 m). It was once one of the tallest in the state. The 34-story building has 356 apartments and 5 levels of indoor parking.

== Stonehenge incident ==
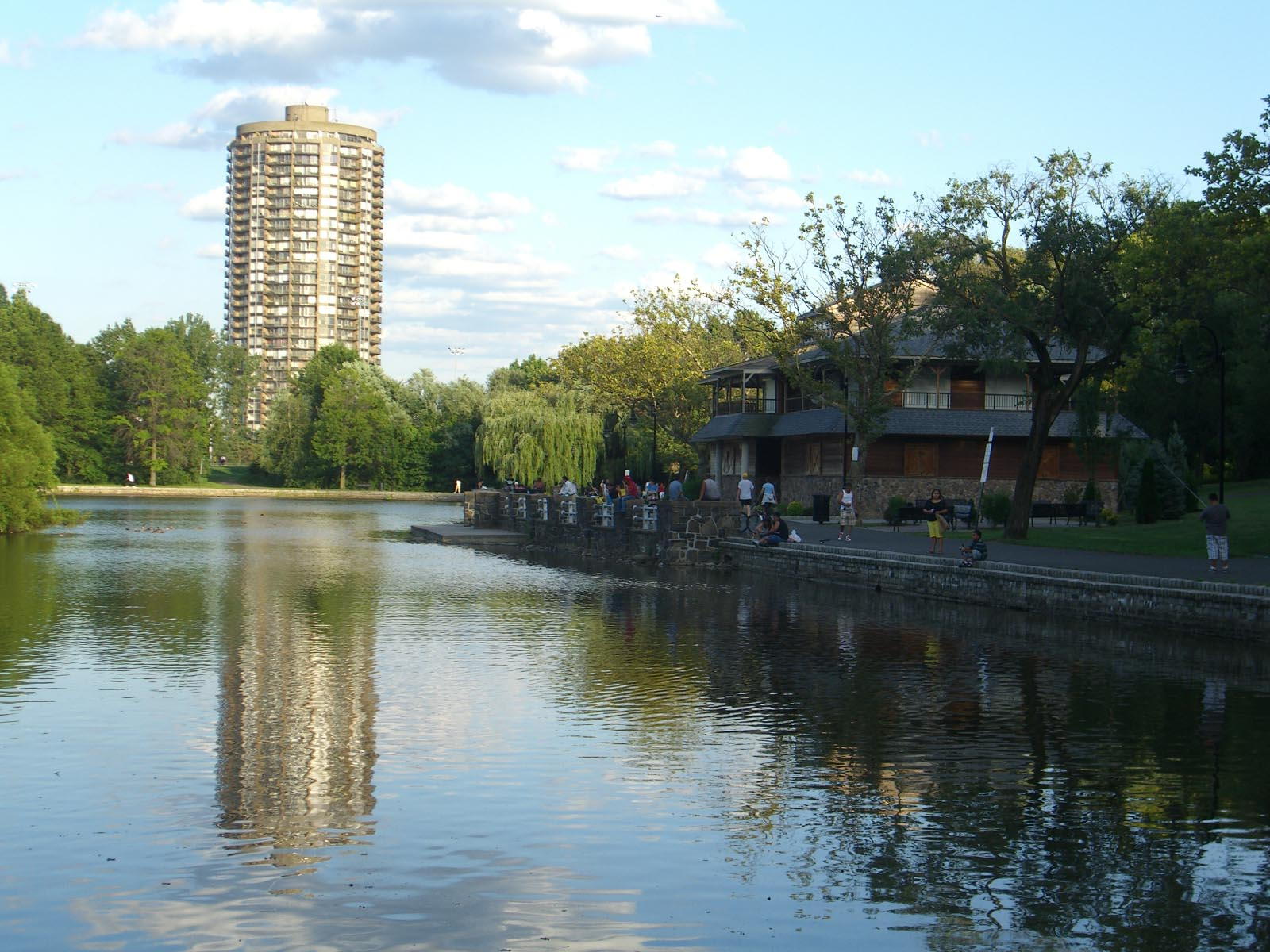
North Hudson Park looking east to the Stonehenge

The "Stonehenge Incident" or the "North Hudson Park UFO sightings" occurred on January 12, 1975. As George O'Barski was driving, he reportedly heard static over his car radio and saw a dark, round "spacecraft" with brightly lit windows hovering over the ground in North Hudson Park. Ten small, hooded, identically dressed figures allegedly emerged from the UFO, dug up soil, and collected it in bags before returning to the craft. O'Barski returned to the site the next day and found the holes. Months later, O'Barski told the story to ufologist Budd Hopkins. Hopkins, along with other ufologists, found independent witnesses who also reported seeing the UFO, including a doorman at the Stonehenge. The incident was reported by Hopkins in The Village Voice, in his 1981 book Missing Time, and also in local newspapers.

== See also ==
- List of tallest buildings in North Hudson
- Galaxy Towers
- WOR TV Tower
