= Hudson Waterfront =

Urban area of northeastern New Jersey

Coordinates: 40.716°N 74.031°W

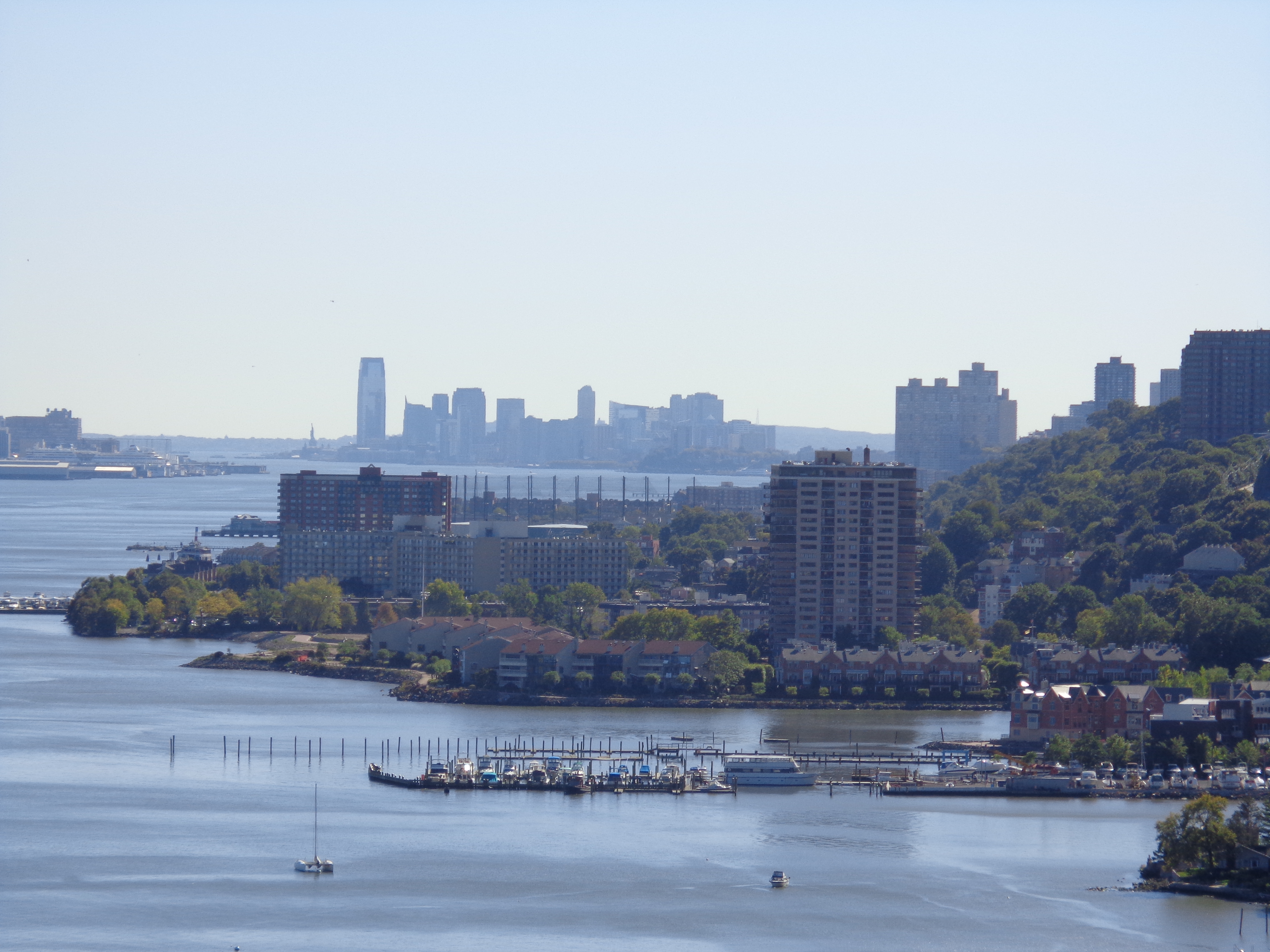
- Looking south from George Washington Bridge to Jersey City in 2013
- Interactive map of Hudson Waterfront
- Counties: Hudson and Bergen

Area
  - Total: 51.22 sq mi (132.7 km^{2})
  - Land: 35.5 sq mi (92 km^{2})
  - Water: 15.72 sq mi (40.7 km^{2})

Population (2022, estimated)
  - Total: 714,888
  - Density: 20,137.7/sq mi (7,775.2/km^{2})
- Time zone: UTC-5 (Eastern)
  - Summer (DST): UTC-4 (Eastern)

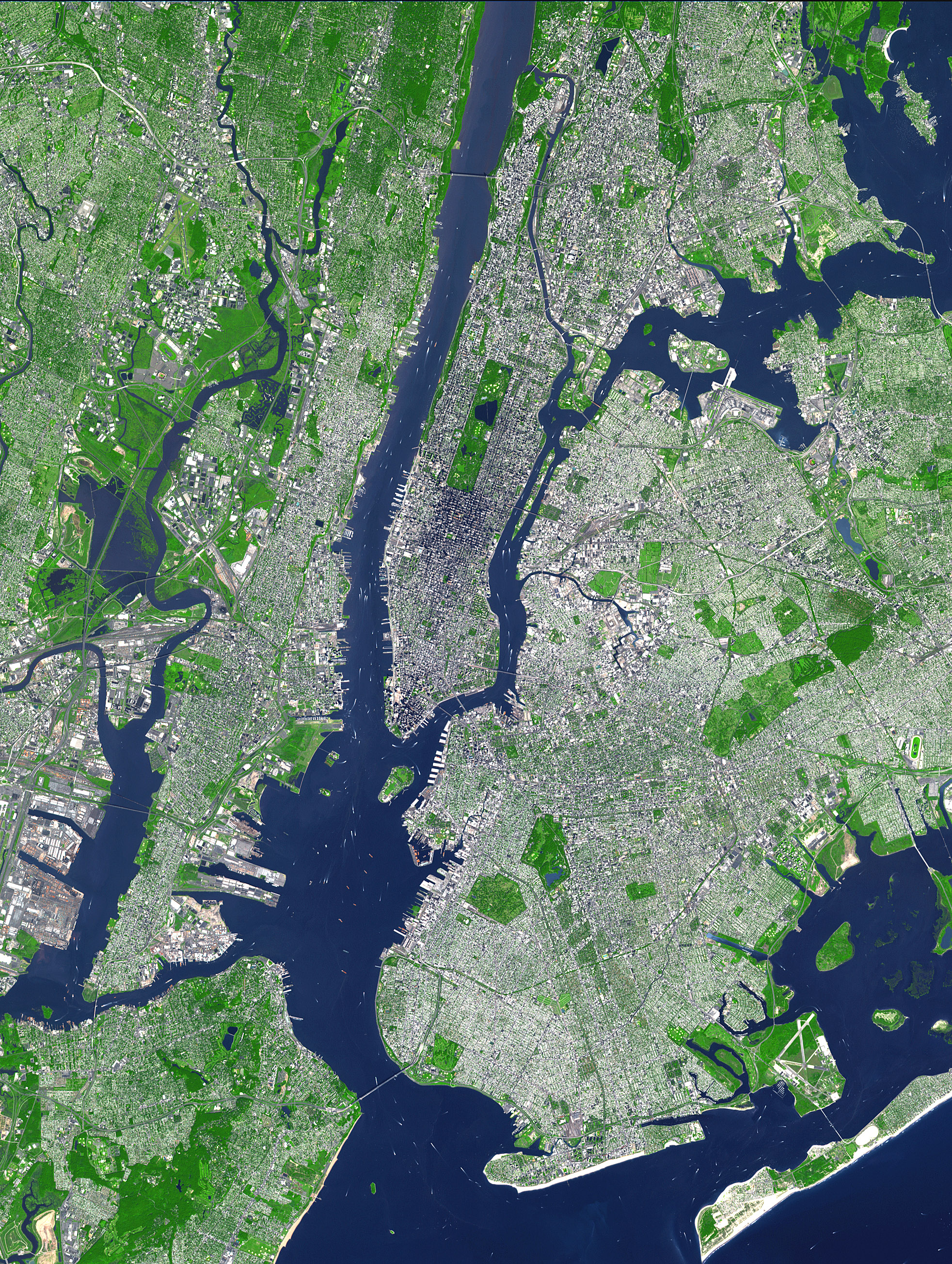
Satellite image showing the inner core of the New York–New Jersey Harbor Estuary and main waterways of Port of New York and New Jersey. The Hudson Waterfront is situated on the peninsula between the Hudson and Hackensack Rivers, and their bays.

The Hudson Waterfront is an urban area of northeastern New Jersey along the lower reaches of the Hudson River, the Upper New York Bay and the Kill van Kull. Though the term can specifically mean the shoreline, it is often used to mean the contiguous urban area between the Bayonne Bridge and the George Washington Bridge that is approximately 19 miles (31 km) long. Historically, the region has been known as Bergen Neck, the lower peninsula, and Bergen Hill, lower Hudson Palisades. It has sometimes been called the Gold Coast.

The municipalities comprising the Hudson Waterfront are Bayonne, Jersey City, Hoboken, Union City, Weehawken, West New York, Guttenberg and North Bergen in Hudson County and Fairview, Cliffside Park, Edgewater and Fort Lee in Bergen County. To the east lies the New York City boroughs of Manhattan and Brooklyn, to the south Staten Island, to the west Newark Bay and the New Jersey Meadowlands and to the north Northern Valley and the Palisades Interstate Park. The Hudson River Waterfront Walkway, which includes sections of the East Coast Greenway, travels along the Hudson River. The Hackensack River Greenway runs along the western side of the peninsula.

During the Dutch colonial era, the area was under the jurisdiction of New Amsterdam and known as Bergen. Jersey City and Hoboken, in Hudson County, are sometimes referred to as the sixth borough of New York City, given their proximity and connections by PATH trains to the city. Fort Lee, in Bergen County, opposite Upper Manhattan and connected by the George Washington Bridge, has also been called New York City's sixth borough.

== Population ==
NASA image of the lower Hudson, still called the North River in maritime usage

With a combined population of approximately 733,875 (based on 2020 estimates), the Hudson Waterfront, if incorporated into a single city, would be the nineteenth most populous in the country while having one of the smallest land areas, at just 35.7 square miles (92 km^{2}). Its communities have some of the highest residential densities in the United States. Of municipalities in the United States over 50,000 people, Union City is the most densely populated. Guttenberg, although one of the smallest municipalities, stretching from 68th Street to 71st Street at 128 acres (0.52 km^{2}), is the most densely populated "town" in the country. Many others are on the list of most densely populated places in the United States.

The region is very ethnically diverse. Jersey City is the "most diverse" city in the United States. Five municipalities are on the list of the 100 cities (with a population over 5,000) with the highest percentages of foreign-born residents: West New York (65.2%), Union City (58.7%), Guttenberg (48.7%), Fairview (48.4%), and Fort Lee (44.7%). Palisades Park, a borough adjacent to Fort Lee, is also on the list, with 57.0%. North Hudson has the second-largest Cuban American population in the United States after Miami. West New York, North Bergen, Union City, Guttenberg and Weehawken have Cuban American populations between 8.75% (Weehawken) and 19.64% (West New York). Another large immigrant group is the Korean-American community near the GWB Plaza – it represents over half of the state's entire Korean population. Nearby Palisades Park boasts the highest percentage (36.38%) and total number (6,065) of Koreans among all municipalities in the state, while Fort Lee has the second-highest total number (5,978) and third-highest percentage (17.18%); Edgewater also has a significant Korean population. The commercial districts of Palisades Park, Fort Lee, Cliffside Park, Edgewater, and Fairview collectively compose a Koreatown. Many in this community attend religious services at St. Michael's in Union City. India Square in the Journal Square district is home to many from the country from which it takes its name. A large Filipino community is located nearby at Five Corners. The first Coptic Orthodox Church in the United States, St. Mark, is one of the many congregations in Jersey City and Bayonne serving the growing Egyptian community.

In many communities in the Hudson Waterfront, English is not the first language spoken at home.

== Transportation ==
Rail service includes New Jersey Transit's Hoboken Division: Main Line to Suffern (and in partnership with MTA/Metro-North, express service to Port Jervis), Bergen County Line, and Pascack Valley Line, all via Secaucus Junction (where transfer is possible to Northeast Corridor Line); Montclair-Boonton Line and Morris and Essex Lines (both via Newark Broad Street Station); North Jersey Coast Line (limited service as Waterfront Connection via Newark Penn Station to Long Branch and Bay Head); Raritan Valley Line (limited service via Newark Penn Station). All of these services stop at Hoboken Terminal.

The Hudson-Bergen Light Rail: serves Bayonne, Liberty State Park, Jersey City's West Side, Downtown Jersey City, Hoboken Terminal, along the foot of the Palisades in Hoboken and Weehawken waterfront, Bergenline and Tonnelle Avenues. The PATH provides 24-hour subway service from Hoboken Terminal (HOB) and Downtown Jersey City and Journal Square (JSQ) to Midtown Manhattan (33rd), the World Trade Center (WTC), and Newark Penn Station (NWK).

NY Waterway provides ferry service, from Jersey City, Hoboken and Weehawken Port Imperial and Edgewater Landing to Battery Park City Ferry Terminal and Wall Street in lower Manhattan, and to West Midtown Ferry Terminal, where free transfer is available to a variety of "loop" buses. Cape Liberty Cruise Port, opened in 2004, restored passenger ships service to the waterfront.

New Jersey Transit as well as private companies provide bus service. Journal Square, Exchange Place, Hoboken Terminal, and Bergenline (HBLR) Station are major origination, destination and transfer points. Manhattan-bound bus service to the Port Authority Bus Terminal and George Washington Bridge Bus Station Local (and some suburban) service is identified by single or double digits: 1, 2, 22, 23, 64, 80, 81, 82, 83, 84, 85, 86, 87 and 88. Manhattan (with local stops) and some suburban service is identified by triple digits: 120, 121, 123, 125, 154, 156, 158, 159, 163, 165, 166, 168, 181 and 188.

Vehicle crossings and highways are the Bayonne Bridge to Staten Island; the Holland Tunnel into Lower Manhattan, Interstate 78, U.S. Route 1/9; the Lincoln Tunnel to Midtown Manhattan, NJ 495, Route 3, and the George Washington Bridge to Upper Manhattan, Palisades Interstate Parkway, U.S. Route 46, Interstate 95, Interstate 80

Newark Liberty Airport (EWR) is the closest international airport in New Jersey with scheduled passenger service. LaGuardia Airport (LGA) is in Flushing, Queens and John F. Kennedy Airport (JFK) is on Jamaica Bay in Queens. Teterboro Airport, in the Hackensack Meadowlands, serves private and corporate planes.

== History ==
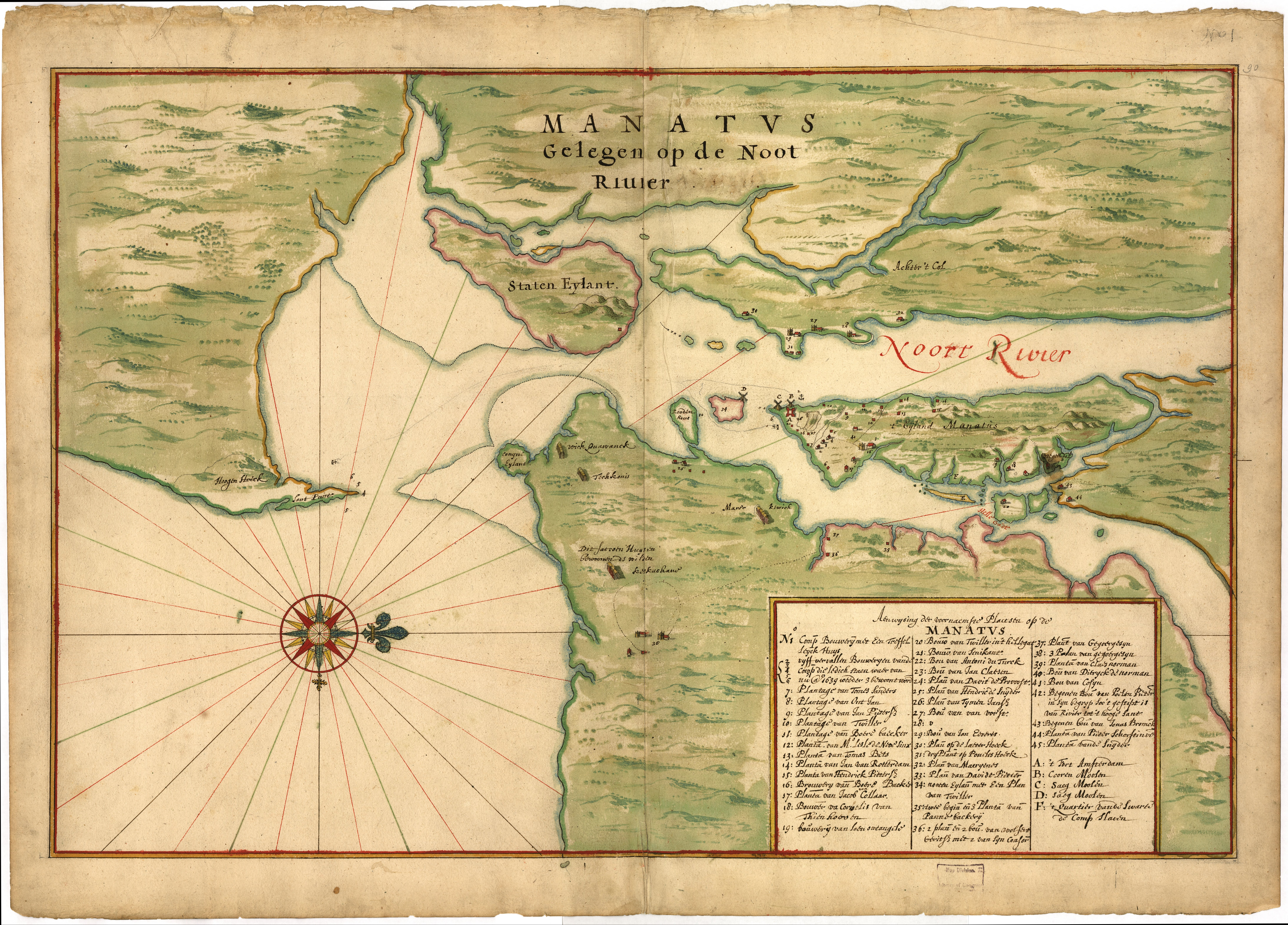
Map (c. 1639) Manhattan situated on the North River with numbered key showing settlements: 27. Farm of Van Vorst; 28. v [sic]; 29. Farm of Evertsen; 30. Plantation at Lacher's Hook; 31. Plantation at Paulus Hook; 32. Plantation of Maerytensen

Before the 17th century, the region was populated by the Hackensack and Tappan, phratries of the Lenni-Lenape, an Algonquian people, who maintained semi-permanent and seasonal campsites throughout the diverse landscape. They are recalled throughout the region in countless places names. In 1609, Henry Hudson captained a sailing expedition for the Dutch West India Company which led to the establishment of the Dutch provincial colony of New Netherland, with its capital at New Amsterdam. During that exploration, he laid anchor in the Upper New York Bay and Weehawken Coves. In 1630, land along the west bank of the river which bears his name was acquired and called Pavonia. Clusters of settlements were located at Communipaw, Harsimus, and Paulus Hook, and later at Hoboken, Pamrapo, Kewan/ Minkakwa, and Vriessendael. Some of the communities were compromised in conflicts with the indigenous population known as Kieft's War and the Peach War. Director-General of New Netherland Peter Stuyvesant granted a charter in 1660 for a village at Bergen Square, considered the first autonomous municipality in New Jersey.

In 1664, four English frigates entered the Upper New York Bay, demanded, and peacefully received, control of Fort Amsterdam, and by extension, all of New Netherland. Bergen, New Netherland thus became part of the Province of New Jersey. In 1668, a charter was granted for the "Towne and Corporation of Bergen". In 1683, East Jersey was divided into four counties, the waterfront region keeping the name given by the New Netherlanders. Bergen encompassed the land between the North River and Hackensack River from Bergen Point north to the ambiguous New York-New Jersey state line For much of the 18th century the villages remained essentially agricultural and fishing communities, supplying the growing city of New York across the river, using ferries including those at Communipaw, Paulus Hook, Weehawken, Bulls Ferry and Burdett's Landing. It was during the colonial period that Newark Plank Road, Hackensack Plank Road and Paterson Plank Road, thoroughfares from the waterfront across the Meadowlands, were laid, and the area of the English Neighborhood was settled. In the American Revolutionary War the New York Harbor was under British control after Washington ordered the retreat from Fort Lee, though he gave instructions to "go to the Bergen heights, Weehawk, Hoebuck or other heights to observe the motions of the enemy's shipping" and gather any other possible intelligence. The attack of the British garrison at Paulus Hook was seen as a victory for American forces. Urbanization of the area began in the early 19th century with City of Jersey and the development of Hoboken, Weehawken, and Edgewater as summer resorts. While some districts were laid out in an urban grid, others developed more randomly following the construction of coach and ferry roads, or drives leading to larger estates or farms. Weehawken was the site for 18 known duels between 1700 and 1845, including the Burr–Hamilton duel in 1804. In 1811, Colonol John Stevens' ship the Juliana, began operation as the first steam-powered ferry service was between Manhattan and Hoboken, which can claim to be the birthplace of baseball The first officially recorded game of baseball in US history took place in Elysian Fields in 1846.

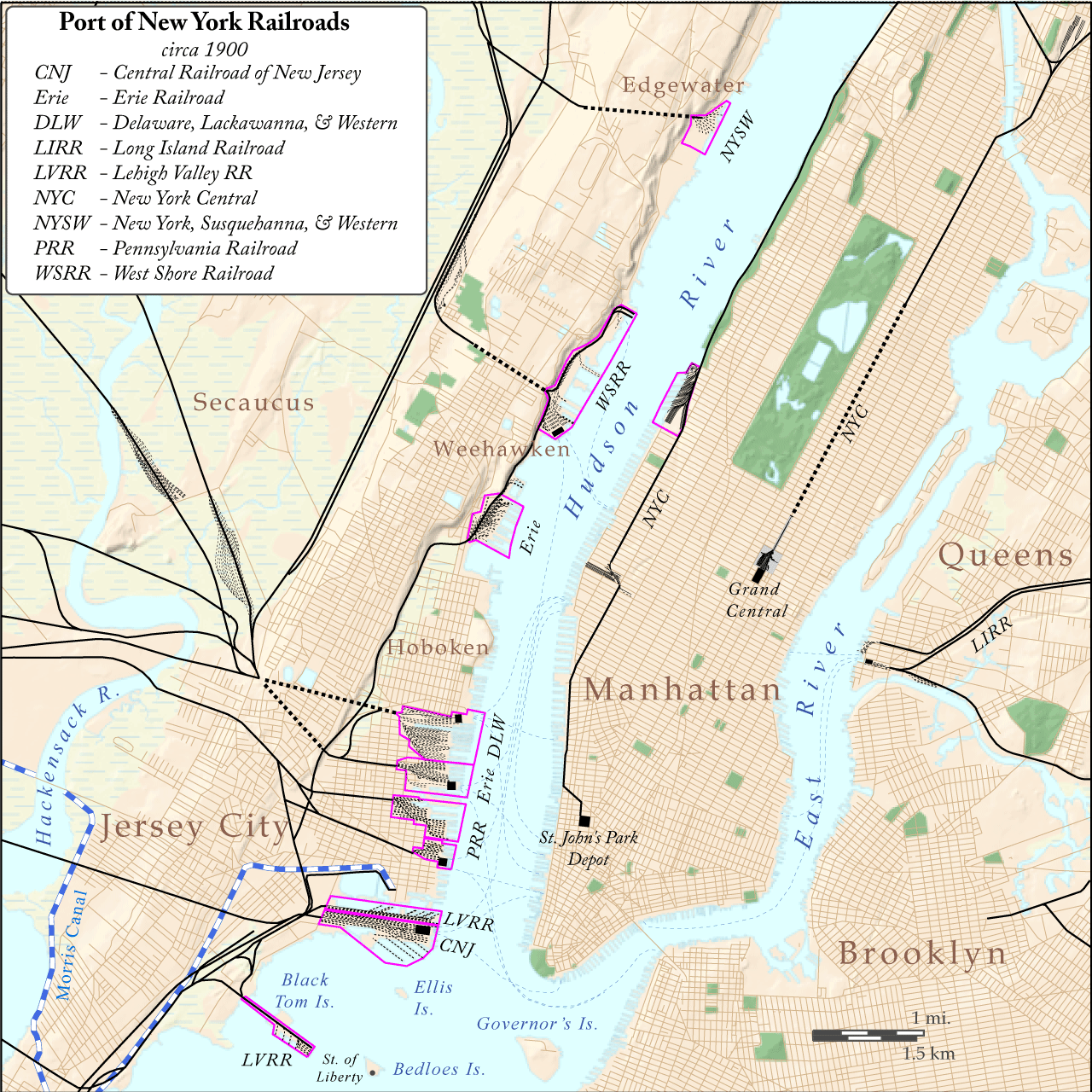
Railroad terminals ca. 1900

During the latter half of the 19th and early part of the 20th centuries, the area experienced intense growth. The short-lived Eldorado Amusement Park and Palisades Amusement Park were both developed atop the cliffs at the turn of the 20th century. German immigration to the United States after 1848 gave the parts of the region a distinctly German flavor, particularly Hoboken, which became a major port for the Hamburg America Line, and North Hudson with the development of breweries and the embroidery industry. Many railroad terminals and maritime facilities were built there. Many immigrants to the USA arrived, first via Castle Clinton and later via Ellis Island. The development of the ports resulted in intense shipping and industrial development along the shore, and residential development further inland. Blasting of the Palisades and landfilling along the water's edge considerably changed the landscape. Rail and trolley car lines were laid, some overland, while others traversed cuts or tunnels. Before the construction, in 1910, of the Pennsylvania Railroad's North River Tunnels under the Hudson, railroads terminated on the west bank of the river, requiring passengers and cargo to travel by ferry or barge to Manhattan. That year, the Hudson and Manhattan Railroad, forerunner of the PATH system, was opened as a partially successful attempt to connect all the rail stations (as well as those in Manhattan) with a mass transit system. The only remaining station in operation is Hoboken Terminal which serves as a terminus for many New Jersey Transit commuter trains. The restored Communipaw Terminal is a prominent waterfront landmark.

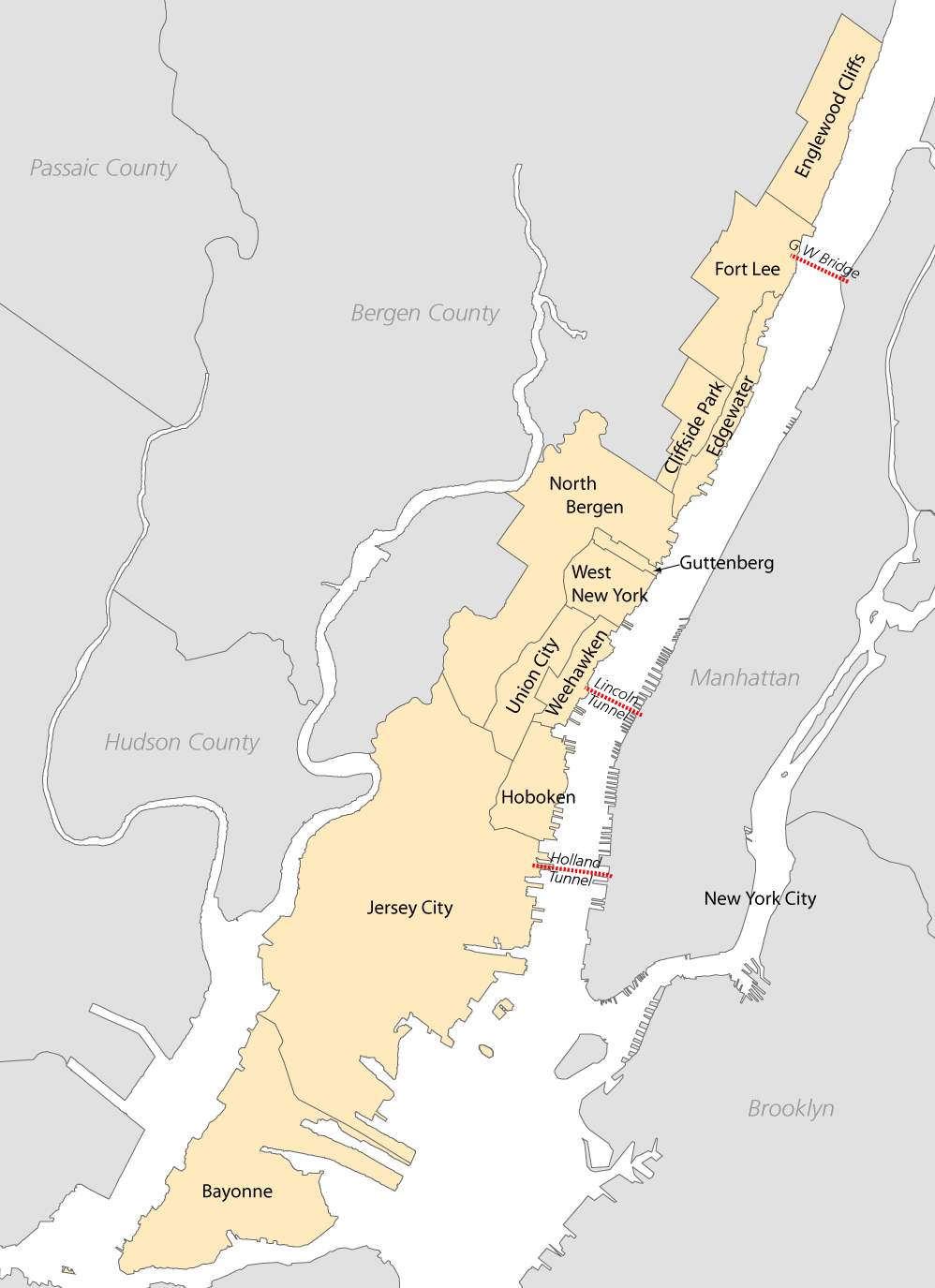
Map of cities on the waterfront, along with Englewood Cliffs

Upon entry to World War I the US government took the Hamburg-American Line piers in Hoboken under eminent domain, and which became the major point of embarkation for more than three million soldiers, known as "doughboys". In 1916, an act of sabotage literally and figuratively shook the region when German agents set off bombs at the munitions depot in New York Bay at Black Tom. The fore-runner of Port Authority of New York and New Jersey was established on April 30, 1921. Huge transportation projects opened between the wars: The Holland Tunnel in 1927, The Bayonne Bridge in 1931, and The Lincoln Tunnel in 1937, allowing vehicular travel between New Jersey and New York City to bypass the waterfront. Hackensack River crossings, notably the Pulaski Skyway, were also built. 125th Street Hudson River bridge never got beyond planning stages.

In 1946, the baseball color line was first crossed at Roosevelt Stadium by Jackie Robinson. Among the many companies who had a presence along the waterfront were Colgate-Palmolive, Standard Oil, Port Johnston Coal Docks, Central Railroad of New Jersey, Lipton Tea, Maxwell House, Bethlehem Steel, Hamburg-American Line, Ford Motor Company, Lever Brothers, and Archer-Daniels-Midland The Military Ocean Terminal at Bayonne opened during World War II.

By the 1970s most traditional industries in the region had been abandoned and the waterfront has been being redeveloped for recreational, residential, and commercial use. After the closing of Palisades Amusement Park in 1971, large residential highrises were built to replace it. Other highrise towers were constructed throughout the area which is still characterized by one and two family homes and low-rise apartment buildings. Liberty State Park opened to coincide with the United States Bicentennial in 1776. Gentrification of Hoboken and Downtown Jersey City's 19th-century districts began. NY Waterway restored ferry service across the Hudson in 1986.

Begun in the 1980s. Since the 1990s the Hudson Waterfront has experienced intensive development, consisting largely of high-density residential buildings, office towers, and retail centers. Some of this development is on brownfields that were once factories, warehouses, docks, and rail yards, particularly in areas along public transportation corridors.

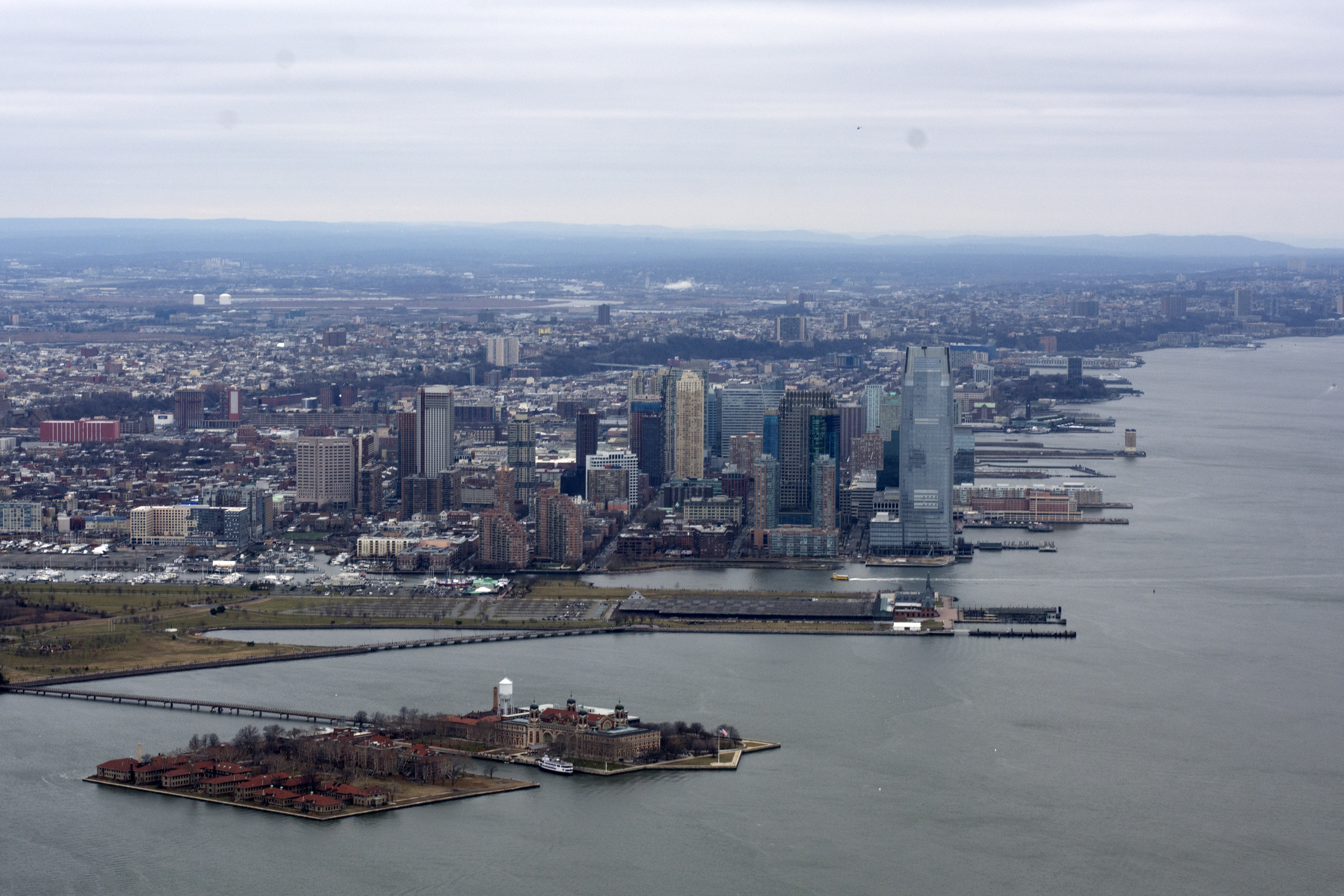
Ellis Island and Downtown Jersey City looking north

It has been called the Gold Coast, a relatively new term coined by real estate agents, brokers, and developers in the 1980s, who realized the investment potential of the area. The name is infrequently used outside the context of real estate sales and marketing. Other residential development is being constructed as single-family housing, multi-family apartments, and condominiums. Access to the Hudson–Bergen Light Rail has spurred much development. The yet unbuilt Northern Branch is planned for a route on the west side of the Palisades. The Hudson River Waterfront Walkway has been constructed to provide contiguous public access to the water's edge with an 18.5-mile (29.8 km) pedestrian promenade. Development pressure has led to attempts to preserve the lower Palisades as a natural resource.

== See also ==
- North River
- List of tallest buildings in Jersey City
- List of tallest buildings in North Hudson
- List of tallest buildings in Fort Lee
- English Neighborhood
- Sixth Borough
- Bergen, New Netherland
- Hackensack RiverWalk
- Hudson River Waterfront Walkway
- List of fixed crossings of the Hudson River
- List of ferries across the Hudson River in New York City
- Port of New York and New Jersey
- List of neighborhoods in Hudson Waterfront municipalities
