= List of tallest buildings in North Hudson =

North Hudson comprises the municipalities of Weehawken, Union City, West New York, Guttenberg and North Bergen in Hudson County, New Jersey. With an estimated population of about 206,000 as of 2022, the contiguous urban area, one of the most densely populated places in the nation, is largely situated atop the Palisades on the Hudson Waterfront along the west bank of the North River.

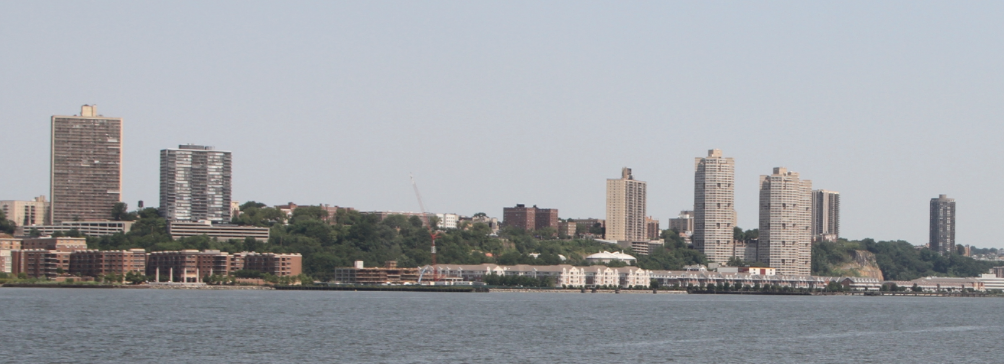
On the Palisades overlooking the Hudson, from left to right: The Riveria, Tower West, The Versailles, The Galaxy, Parker Imperial and The Stonehenge, all built from the 1960s to the 1970s. The cluster of high-rises on Boulevard East is situated on the Hudson Waterfront between the tallest buildings in Jersey City and those in Fort Lee.

The area lies north of Hoboken and Jersey City, across the river from Midtown Manhattan and the Upper West Side in New York City, and east of the New Jersey Meadowlands. Its high elevation of about 260 ft (79 m) affords North Hudson expansive views of the Manhattan skyline to the east and of the Meadowlands, as well as the Watchung Mountains beyond, to the west. Many of the tall buildings are part of a string of residential high-rises that continues north along the Boulevard East–Palisade Avenue–River Road corridors into the eastern Bergen County towns of Cliffside Park, Edgewater and Fort Lee. Many of the buildings went up during a boom in development in the late 1960s and early 1970s. In Weehawken, building heights are restricted if they would disturb the view of the Hudson River and New York skyline. There is proposed state legislation to restrict building heights that would rise above the cliffs or Palisade Avenue along the entire corridor from Jersey City to Fort Lee.

== Buildings over 250 feet (76 m) ==
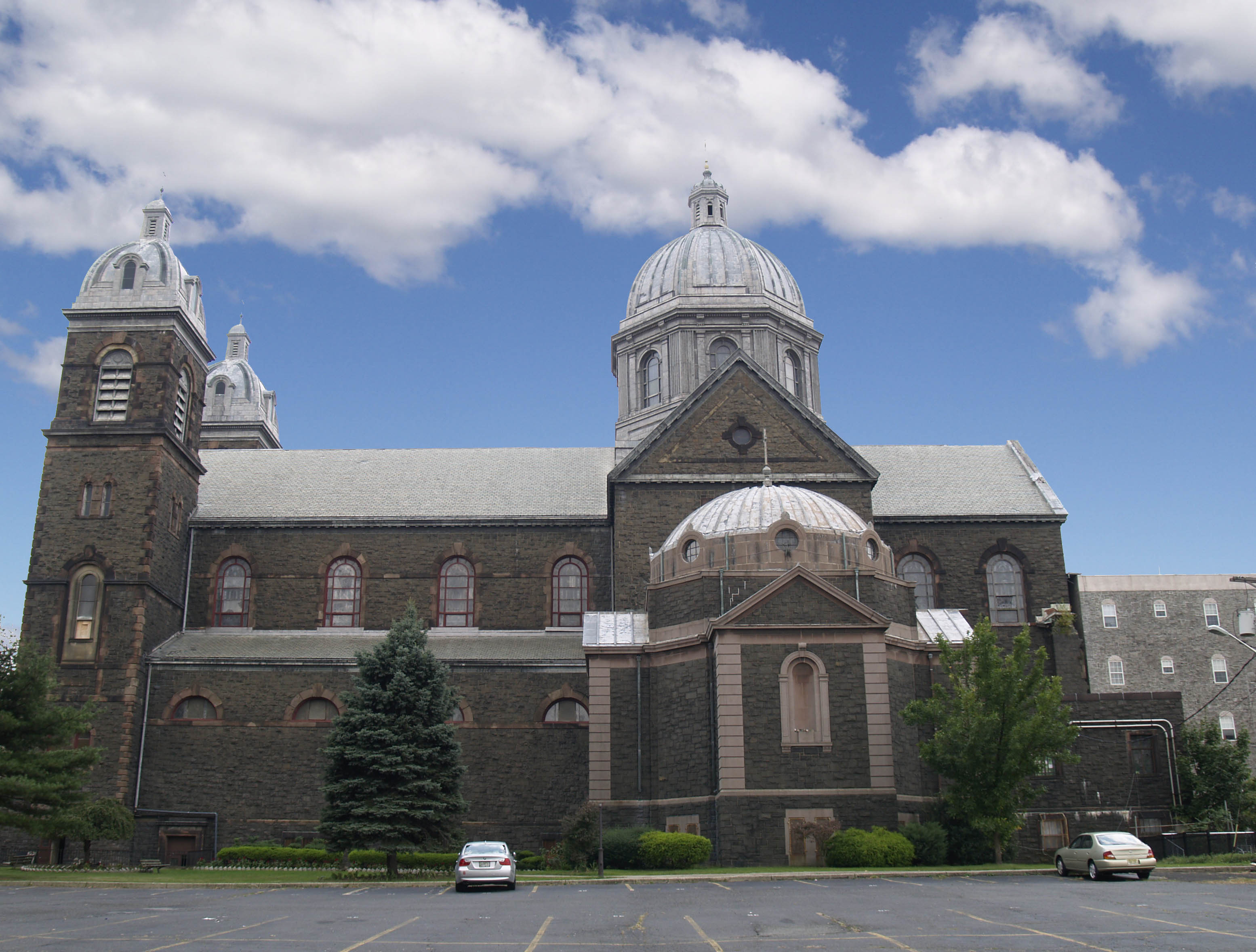
Church of Saint Michael the Archangel was completed c.1875 and rises 176 ft (54 m)

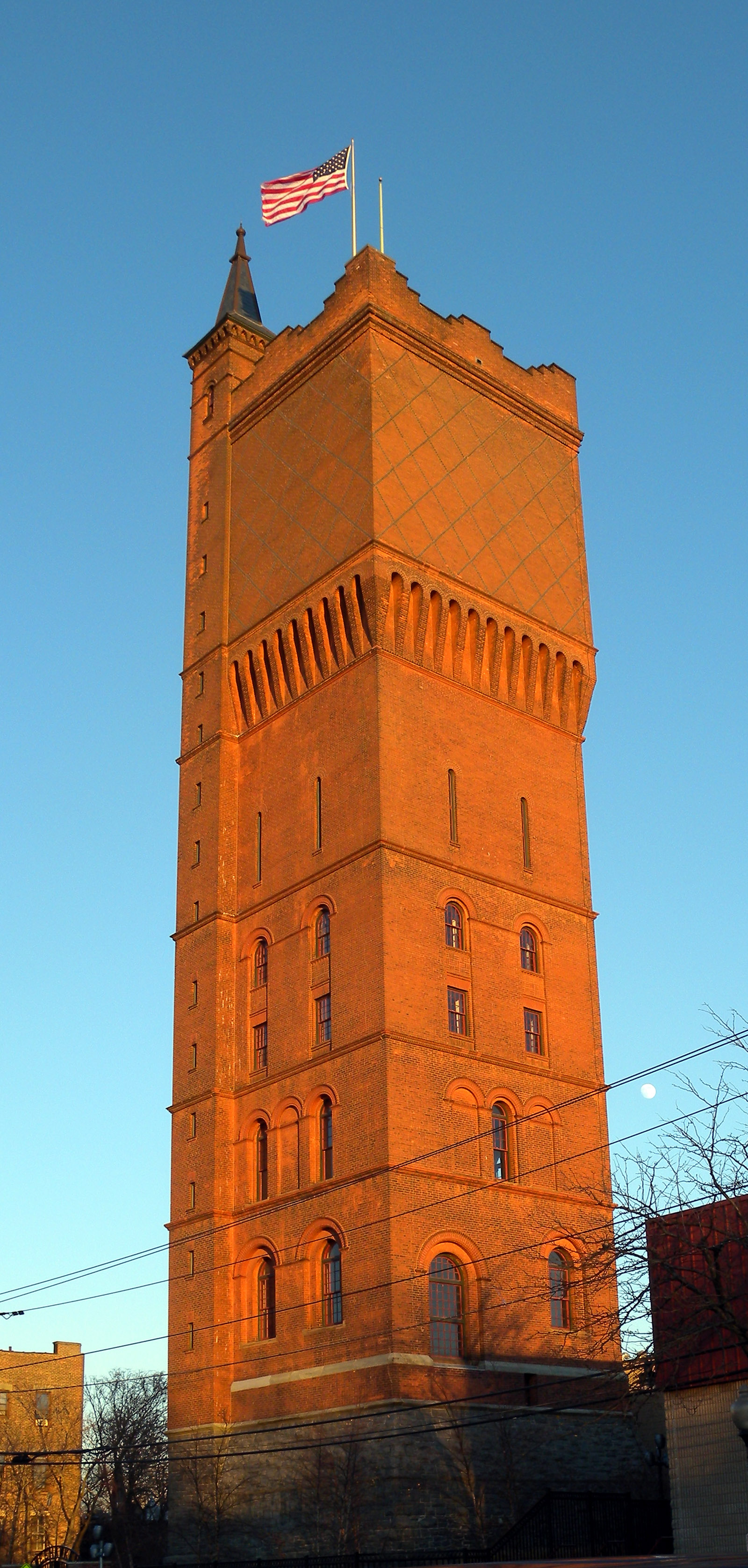
The Weehawken Water Tower, 175 ft (53 m) tall, was built in 1883

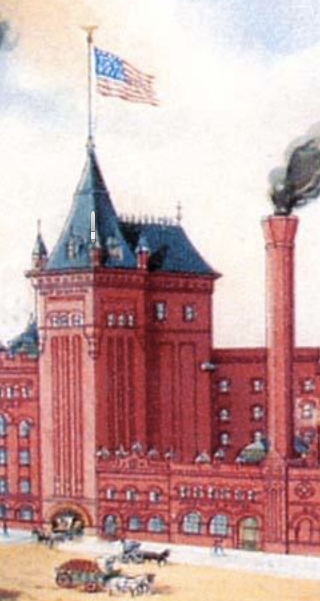
The Hudson County Brewing Company headquarters circa 1901 in what was West Hoboken, was razed in 1930s on site of the also demolished Roosevelt Stadium

.

Rank	Name	Image	Height ft / m	Floors	Year	Locale	Notes
1, 2, 3	Galaxy Towers		415 feet (126 m)	44	1976	Boulevard East; Guttenberg	
4	The Stonehenge		369 feet (112 m)	34	1967	Boulevard East; Woodcliff; North Bergen	
5	Parker Imperial		366 ft (112 m)	30	1975	Boulevard East; Woodcliff; North Bergen	
6	Riviera Towers		359 ft (109 m)	38	1965	Boulevard East; West New York	"FindLaw's Superior Court of New Jersey, Appellate Division case and opinions". Findlaw.
7	The Versailles		346 ft (105 m)	29	1964	Boulevard East; West New York	
8	Tower West		323 feet (98 m)	27	1962	Boulevard East; West New York	
9	Overlook Terrace North		311 ft (95 m)	26	1969	Boulevard East; West New York	
10	Overlook Terrace South		311 ft (95 m)	26	1969	Boulevard East; West New York	
11	Bella Vista		289 ft (88 m)	24	1977	Bergenline; Union City	
12	Parkview Towers North		287 ft (87 m)	24	1975	West New York	
13	Parkview Towers South		287 ft (87 m)	24	1975	West New York	
14	The Doric		277 ft (84 m)	23	1969	Palisades; Union City	
15	Troy Towers		265 ft (81 m)	22	1965	Palisades; Union City	

== Notable towers ==
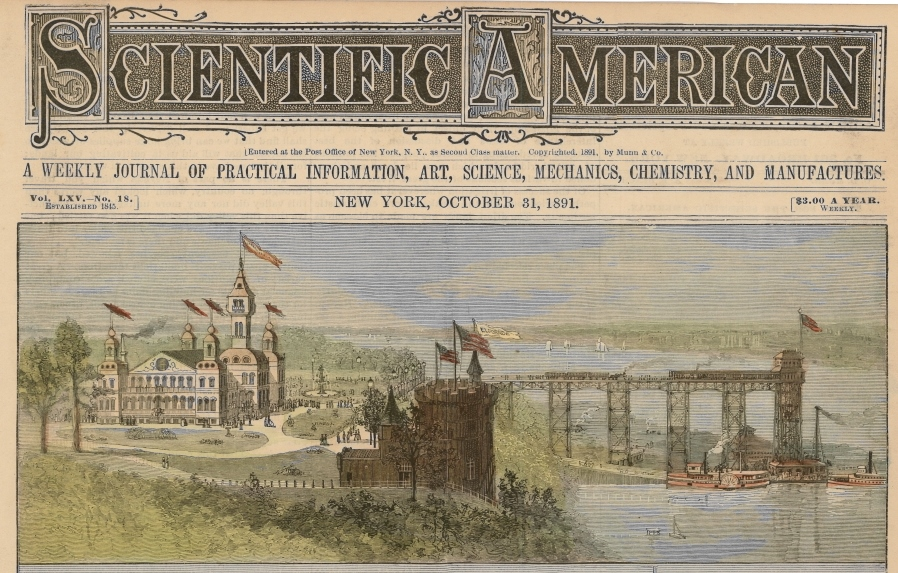
Eldorado Elevator

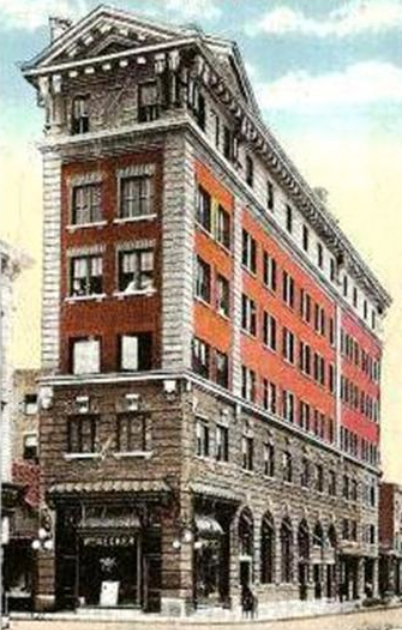
Necker Building c.1900

The White Brewery was built adjacent to Hudson Palisades, the site of today's Galaxy Towers in 1855. The eight-story building was destroyed in a fire in 1896.

The dome of Monastery and Church of Saint Michael the Archangel, built between 1866 and 1875, rises 176 ft (54 m).

The Weehawken Water Tower, built in 1883, is 175 ft (53 m) tall.

In 1890, the North Hudson County Railway built an elevator tower and viaduct to connect with trains at Weehawken Terminal with its street car lines on top of the Palisades. With the closure of the Gutenberg Racetrack, traffic diminished, and the service was discontinued. The 153 ft (47 m) tall towers supporting the 873 ft (266 m) long viaduct were dismantled in 1900.

The Hudson County Brewing Company headquarters and plant built circa 1901 in what was West Hoboken was demolished in the early 1930s and became the site of Roosevelt Stadium.

The WOR TV Tower was a 760 ft (230 m) tall lattice tower used for FM- and TV-broadcasting at North Bergen built in 1949, which at that time made the tenth tallest man-made structure in the world. On November 8, 1956, the top of the tower was hit by a small aircraft, which knocked off the top and killed six people. It was later dismantled.

== Sources ==
- Emporis North Bergen
- Emporis Guttenberg
- Emporis West New York
- Emporis Weehawken
- Emporis Union City
