= List of neighborhoods in Hudson Waterfront municipalities =

List of districts, sections, and neighborhoods in Hudson Waterfront municipalities:

- Anderson Ave
- Beacon
- Bergen Hill
- Bergen Square
- Bergenline
- Bergen-Lafayette
- Bergenwood
- Bergen Point
- Boulevard East
- Bull's Ferry
- Castle Point
- Communipaw
- Constable Hook
- Croxton
- Curries Woods
- Droyer's Point
- Country Village
- Croxton
- Edgewater Colony
- Exchange Place
- Five Corners
- Downtown Jersey City
- Droyer's Point
- Greenville
- Hamilton Park
- Harsimus
- Harmon Cove
- India Square
- Jersey City Heights
- Journal Square
- Liberty State Park
- Marion Section
- McGinley Square
- Meadowview
- MOTBY
- New Durham
- Newport
- North Hudson
- Nungessers
- Pamrapo
- Paulus Hook
- Port Jersey
- Port Liberte
- Powerhouse
- Racetrack
- Schuetzen Park
- Shadyside
- Transfer Station
- Undercliff
- Union Hill
- Van Vorst Park
- WALDO
- Weehawken Heights
- West Side, Jersey City
- Western Slope
- Woodcliff
