= Rising Star Academy =

Private school in Hudson County, New Jersey

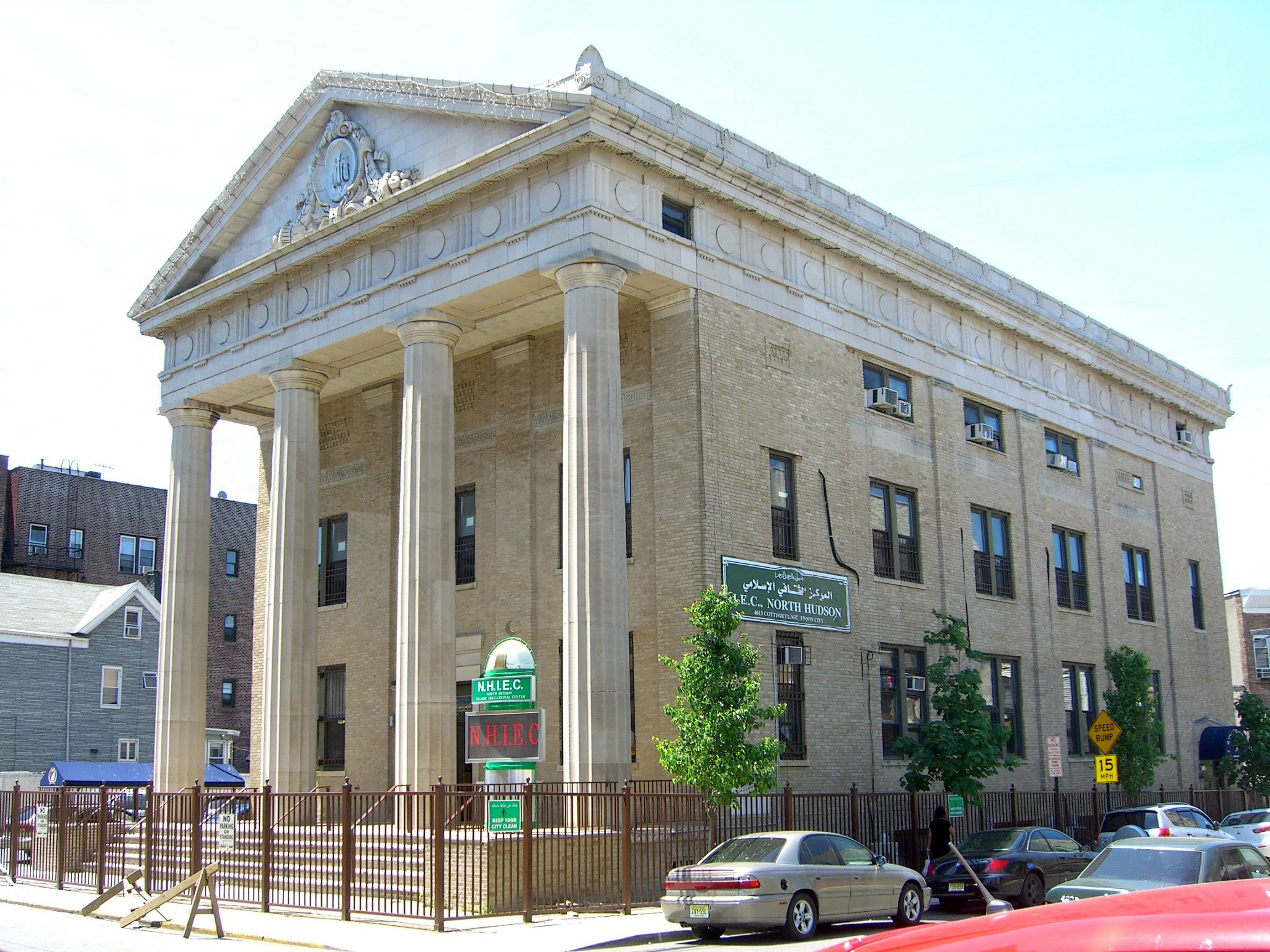

Location
- 4613 Cottage Place; Union City, Hudson County, New Jersey 07087; United States
- 40.78119°N 74.02330°W

Information
- Type: Private
- Motto: Knowledge-Leadership-Faith
- Established: 2009
- NCES School ID: A1101531
- Principal: Hala Shehadeh
- Faculty: 29.9 FTEs
- Grades: PreK-12
- Enrollment: 216 (plus 21 in PreK, as of 2019–20)
- Student to teacher ratio: 7.2:1
- Website: www.rsanj.org

Rising Star Academy is a private Islamic day school for students in pre-K through twelfth grades, located in Union City, in Hudson County, New Jersey, United States, established in 2009.

As of the 2019–20 school year, the school had an enrollment of 216 students (plus 21 in PreK) and 29.9 classroom teachers (on an FTE basis), for a student–teacher ratio of 7.2:1. The school's student body was 55.6% (120) Black, 41.2% (89) White and 3.2% (7) Hispanic.

== History ==
Rising Star Academy opened in September 2009 by the North Hudson Islamic Educational Center, a Sunni Muslim mosque established in 1992 in Union City. The mosque's 2,000-member congregation includes approximately 500 Latino converts from other religions, such as Catholicism.

The school received accreditation from the Middle States Association of Colleges and Schools Commissions on Elementary and Secondary Schools in May 2016 and is accredited until July 2024.
