= List of United States cities by population density =

The following is a list of incorporated places in the United States with a population density of over 10,000 people per square mile. As defined by the United States Census Bureau, an incorporated place is a place that has a self-governing local government and as such has been "incorporated" by the state it is in. Each state has different laws defining how a place can be incorporated. An "incorporated place" as recognized by the U.S. Census Bureau can designate a variety of places, such as a city, town, village, borough, and township. (Note: Townships are a special case because in many states townships do not act as incorporated places, but townships in New Jersey and townships in Pennsylvania are civil townships and do act as self-governing municipalities, and for most purposes are equivalent to other "incorporated" places as defined by the U.S. Census Bureau. Because these municipalities have local governments and are essentially incorporated in the state, townships in these two states are included in the list. Home rule municipalities in Pennsylvania, some of which retain the name "Township", are not civil townships under Pennsylvania law, but are not recognized as a separate category of places by the U.S. Census Bureau. Sometimes the U.S. Census Bureau regards these places as minor civil divisions and not "incorporated", as it also sometimes does to New England towns. However, all places in New England on this list are classified as cities and so do not have this problem, as cities in New England are regarded as "incorporated" by the U.S. Census Bureau.)

The other type of place defined by the U.S. Census Bureau for statistical purposes are census-designated places. Census-designated places are distinct from incorporated places because they do not have a local government and thus depend on higher government bodies, such as a county, for governance. Census-designated places are defined as being in an unincorporated area. Census-designated places that have a population density of over 10,000 people per square mile are listed in a separate table below. The five boroughs of New York City, and the census-designated places of Puerto Rico and the Northern Mariana Islands that have densities over 10,000, are also listed in separate tables below.

== Incorporated places with a density of over 10,000 people per square mile ==
The following data about the most densely populated incorporated places in the United States is from the U.S. Census Bureau and is from the 2020 U.S. census, except for the tables on Puerto Rico, which show data from the 2000 US Census. The following ranking is made up of incorporated places of any population, but also of interest may be lists compiled by the U.S. Census Bureau of all places with at least 50,000 population, arranged alphabetically by state, and ranked by total population; the population density for each place is also given in the lists.

The population density is calculated by dividing the population by the land area so that it represents the number of people living in one square mile of land area. The population densities listed in the table below do not work out to be exactly the result of dividing the listed population by the listed land area because the land areas have been rounded off to two decimal places, but the population densities were calculated before rounding the land area figures. The land area figures are calculated using the U.S. Census Bureau's TIGER system. The U.S. Census Bureau has released the exact land area figures for all places in the U.S. in square meters and square miles; the exact land areas are the figures used for calculating the population densities seen in the table below.

=== Cities ===
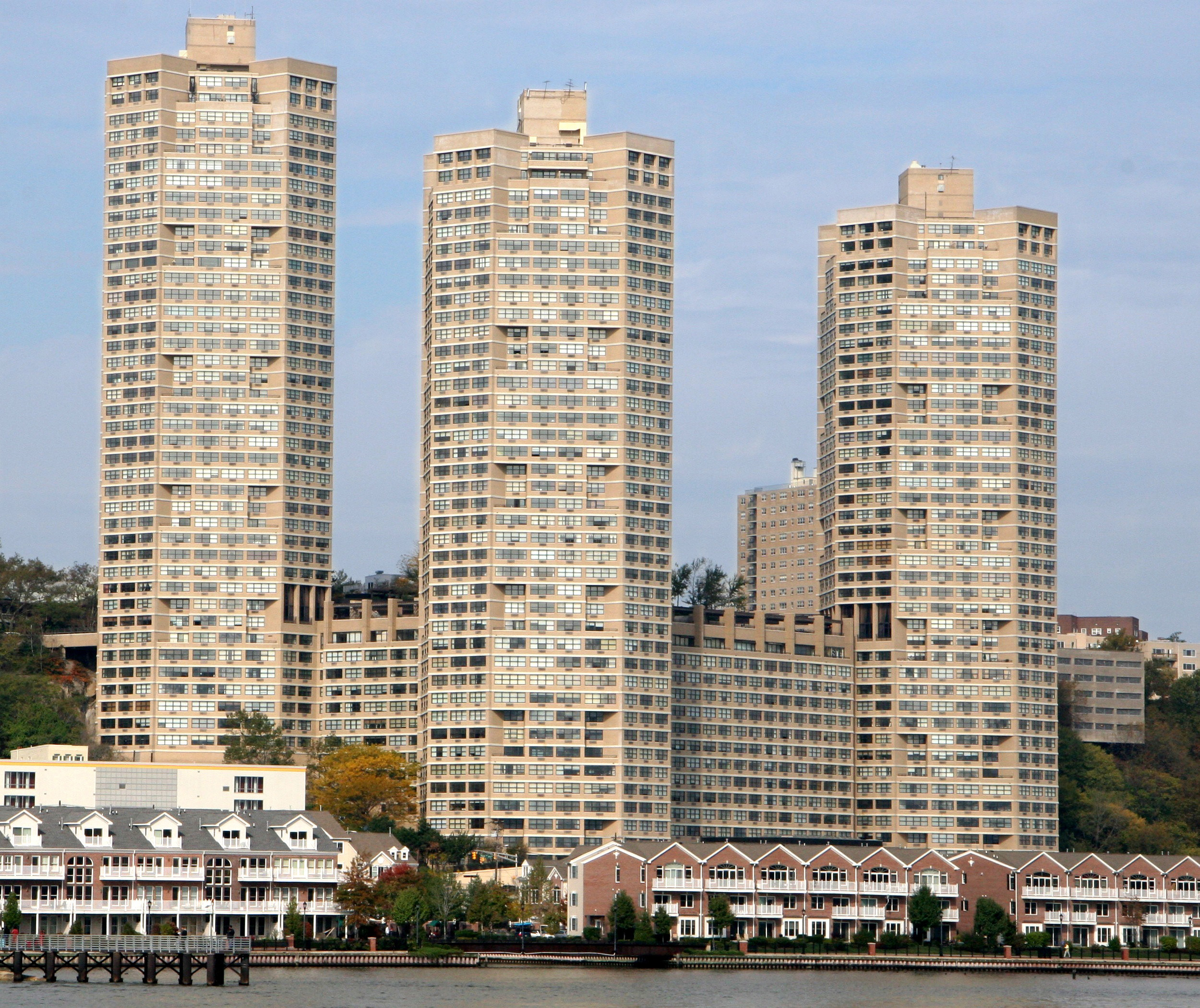
Galaxy Towers in Guttenberg, New Jersey

The list below only includes incorporated places of the 50 states and the District of Columbia. Unincorporated census-designated places, places in Puerto Rico, and the five boroughs of New York City are all listed in separate tables below.

Those cities that are not a part of a larger city's metropolitan area are in bold.

Incorporated place	Metro area	ST	Population (2020)	Land area (mi^{2})	Land area (km^{2})	Density (/mi^{2})	Density (/km^{2})
Guttenberg	New York City	NJ	12,017	0.19	0.50	62,264.2	24,040.3
Union City	New York City	NJ	68,589	1.29	3.33	53,293.7	20,576.8
West New York	New York City	NJ	52,912	0.99	2.57	53,231.4	20,552.8
Hoboken	New York City	NJ	60,419	1.25	3.24	48,335.2	18,662.3
Kaser	New York City	NY	5,491	0.17	0.445	31,924.4	12,360.6
**New York City**	New York City	NY	8,804,190	300.5	778.16	29,302.7	11,313.8
Cliffside Park	New York City	NJ	25,693	0.96	2.48	26,875.5	10,376.7
New Square	New York City	NY	9,679	0.37	0.951	26,373.3	10,192.1
East Newark	New York City	NJ	2,594	0.10	0.27	25,184.5	9,723.8
Great Neck Plaza	New York City	NY	7,482	0.311	0.805	24,057.9	9,276.4
Kiryas Joel	New York City	NY	32,954	1.46	3.79	22,540.4	8,704.4
Passaic	New York City	NJ	70,537	3.13	8.11	22,514.2	8,692.8
Sunny Isles Beach	Miami	FL	22,342	1.01	2.62	22,098.9	8,536.0
North Bay Village	Miami	FL	8,159	0.37	0.958	22,051.4	8,520.3
Weehawken (Note: This New Jersey municipality is officially a township and is sometimes not regarded as "incorporated" by the U.S. Census Bureau. See the explanation above in the first note for why it is included in this list of incorporated places.)	New York City	NJ	17,197	0.78	2.03	21,934.9	8,469.1
Maywood	Los Angeles	CA	25,138	1.17	3.04	21,485.5	8,295.6
Irvington	New York City	NJ	61,176	2.91	7.55	20,993.8	8,105.8
Jersey City	New York City	NJ	292,449	14.74	38.19	19,835.1	7,658.4
Somerville	Boston	MA	81,045	4.12	10.68	19,652.0	7,588.2
Cudahy	Los Angeles	CA	22,811	1.18	3.05	19,331.4	7,463.9
Paterson	New York City	NJ	159,732	8.41	21.79	18,986.3	7,330.7
West Hollywood	Los Angeles	CA	35,757	1.89	4.89	18,919.0	7,304.7
Central Falls	Providence	RI	22,583	1.19	3.09	18,913.7	7,302.6
**San Francisco**	Bay Area	CA	873,965	46.91	120.51	18,630.7	7,193.3
Cambridge	Boston	MA	118,403	6.39	16.56	18,512.0	7,147.0
Chelsea	Boston	MA	40,787	2.22	5.75	18,380.8	7,097.9
Huntington Park	Los Angeles	CA	54,883	3.01	7.79	18,233.6	7,040.0
South Floral Park	New York City	NY	1,741	0.10	0.251	17,948.5	6,910.9
Fairview	New York City	NJ	15,025	0.84	2.19	17,802.1	6,873.4
East Orange	New York City	NJ	69,612	3.93	10.17	17,722.0	6,842.5
Mount Vernon	New York City	NY	73,893	4.39	11.38	16,824.5	6,495.8
Spring Valley	New York City	NY	33,066	2.01	5.21	16,467.1	6,357.6
Millbourne	Philadelphia	PA	1,212	0.07	0.192	16,378.4	6,323.7
Palisades Park	New York City	NJ	20,292	1.24	3.21	16,377.7	6,323.5
Lawndale	Los Angeles	CA	31,807	1.97	5.11	16,145.7	6,233.9
Harrison	New York City	NJ	19,450	1.21	3.14	16,061.1	6,201.2
Bell Gardens	Los Angeles	CA	39,501	2.46	6.37	16,057.3	6,199.8
Hempstead	New York City	NY	59,169	3.69	9.56	16,030.6	6,189.9
Fort Lee	New York City	NJ	40,191	2.52	6.52	15,961.5	6,162.8
Long Beach	New York City	NY	35,029	2.22	5.74	15,793.1	6,098.7
Orange	New York City	NJ	34,447	2.21	5.73	15,565.7	6,010.0
Garfield	New York City	NJ	32,655	2.11	5.47	15,469.0	5,972.6
Poplar Hills	Louisville	KY	380	0.025	0.065	15,200.0	5,868.8
Aventura	Miami	FL	40,242	2.65	6.86	15,197.1	5,867.3
Bay Harbor Islands	Miami	FL	5,922	0.40	1.026	14,954.5	5,768.6
Hawaiian Gardens	Los Angeles	CA	14,149	0.95	2.45	14,893.7	5,750.5
Manorhaven	New York City	NY	6,956	0.47	1.21	14,831.6	5,720.6
Edgewater	New York City	NJ	14,336	0.97	2.51	14,764.2	5,700.5
Berwyn	Chicago	IL	57,250	3.90	10.11	14,664.4	5,662.0
Cicero	Chicago	IL	85,268	5.87	15.19	14,538.4	5,613.3
Hawthorne	Los Angeles	CA	88,083	6.09	15.77	14,463.5	5,584.4
Everett	Boston	MA	49,075	3.42	8.85	14,366.2	5,546.1
**Boston**	Boston	MA	675,647	48.34	125.20	13,977.0	5,396.5
Lynwood	Los Angeles	CA	67,265	4.84	12.54	13,897.7	5,365.9
Hermosa Beach	Los Angeles	CA	19,728	1.43	3.69	13,795.8	5,326.6
South Palm Beach	Miami	FL	1,471	0.11	0.28	13,747.7	5,291.8
Daly City	Bay Area	CA	104,901	7.64	19.78	13,730.5	5,301.4
Prospect Park	New York City	NJ	6,372	0.47	1.20	13,703.2	5,290.8
Port Chester	New York City	NY	31,693	2.33	6.03	13,613.8	5,256.0
Hamtramck	Detroit	MI	28,433	2.09	5.41	13,604.3	5,253.1
Bell	Los Angeles	CA	33,559	2.51	6.50	13,370.1	5,162.2
Woodlynne	Philadelphia	NJ	2,902	0.22	0.56	13,311.9	5,139.8
Stone Park	Chicago	IL	4,576	0.34	0.891	13,302.3	5,136.1
East Lansdowne	Philadelphia	PA	2,714	0.21	0.536	13,174.8	5,078.8
Malden	Boston	MA	66,263	5.04	13.06	13,137.0	5,072.1
Mount Rainier	Washington, D.C.	MD	8,333	0.64	1.65	13,102.2	5,056.3
Bellflower	Los Angeles	CA	79,190	6.12	15.84	12,939.5	4,996.0
Newark	New York City	NJ	311,549	24.14	62.53	12,903.8	4,982.2
Lawrence	Boston	MA	89,143	6.93	17.95	12,863.4	4,966.7
Elmwood Park	Chicago	IL	24,521	1.91	4.94	12,851.7	4,962.1
South Gate	Los Angeles	CA	92,726	7.24	18.74	12,807.5	4,945.0
Darby	Philadelphia	PA	10,715	0.84	2.18	12,725.7	4,912.1
North Bergen	New York City	NJ	63,361	5.14	13.30	12,336.6	4,763.2
Bayonne	New York City	NJ	71,686	5.82	15.08	12,315.1	4,754.9
**Miami**	Miami	FL	442,241	36.00	93.23	12,284.5	4,743.6
San Pablo	Bay Area	CA	32,127	2.62	6.80	12,262.2	4,734.5
Stanton	Los Angeles	CA	37,962	3.10	8.03	12,245.8	4,728.1
Williston Park	New York City	NY	7,591	0.63	1.62	12,126.2	4,680.1
New Hyde Park	New York City	NY	10,257	0.85	2.20	12,095.5	4,671.5
**Chicago**	Chicago	IL	2,746,388	227.73	589.82	12,059.8	4,656.3
Trenton	New York City	NJ	90,871	7.58	19.63	11,989.8	4,629.3
Wallington	New York City	NJ	11,868	0.99	2.57	11,939.6	4,609.9
**Philadelphia**	Philadelphia	PA	1,603,797	134.36	347.98	11,936.9	4,608.9
Berkeley	Bay Area	CA	124,321	10.43	27.02	11,919.6	4,602.2
Perth Amboy	New York City	NJ	55,436	4.66	12.07	11,891.0	4,591.2
Inglewood	Los Angeles	CA	107,762	9.07	23.48	11,881.1	4,587.3
Key Biscayne	Miami	FL	14,809	1.25	3.23	11,875.7	4,584.3
East Palo Alto	Bay Area	CA	30,034	2.53	6.55	11,871.1	4,583.5
Tuckahoe	New York City	NY	7,084	0.60	1.56	11,787.0	4,550.9
Yonkers	New York City	NY	211,569	18.01	46.64	11,749.9	4,536.8
Valley Stream	New York City	NY	40,634	3.48	9.01	11,683.2	4,511.2
Bogota	New York City	NJ	8,778	0.76	1.96	11,626.5	4,489.0
Oak Park	Chicago	IL	54,583	4.70	12.17	11,613.4	4,484.0
Belleville	New York City	NJ	38,222	3.30	8.54	11,596.5	4,477.4
Lodi	New York City	NJ	26,206	2.27	5.88	11,534.3	4,453.4
Redondo Beach	Los Angeles	CA	71,576	6.21	16.07	11,525.9	4,450.2
El Monte	Los Angeles	CA	109,450	9.56	24.75	11,448.7	4,420.4
Roselle Park	New York City	NJ	13,967	1.23	3.17	11,401.6	4,402.2
Floral Park	New York City	NY	16,172	1.42	3.68	11,380.7	4,394.2
Paramount	Los Angeles	CA	53,733	4.73	12.24	11,360.0	4,386.1
Santa Ana	Los Angeles	CA	310,227	27.34	70.81	11,347.0	4,381.1
Albany	Bay Area	CA	20,271	1.79	4.64	11,324.6	4,372.4
**Washington**	Washington, D.C.	DC	689,545	61.13	158.3	11,280.7	4,355.4
Parkside	Philadelphia	PA	2,321	0.21	0.534	11,267.0	4,354.4
Mineola	New York City	NY	20,800	1.85	4.79	11,237.2	4,338.4
Elizabeth	New York City	NJ	137,298	12.32	31.91	11,145.2	4,303.2
Island Park	New York City	NY	4,928	0.45	1.153	11,074.2	4,278.4
Santa Monica	Los Angeles	CA	93,076	8.41	21.78	11,067.3	4,273.1
Harwood Heights	Chicago	IL	9,065	0.83	2.14	10,987.9	4,242.4
Hackensack	New York City	NJ	46,030	4.19	10.85	10,983.1	4,240.6
Lomita	Los Angeles	CA	20,921	1.91	4.95	10,953.4	4,229.1
La Puente	Los Angeles	CA	38,062	3.48	9.01	10,937.4	4,222.9
Cedarhurst	New York City	NY	7,374	0.68	1.75	10,924.4	4,219.2
Victory Gardens	New York City	NJ	1,582	0.15	0.38	10,910.3	4,212.5
Revere	Boston	MA	62,186	5.7	14.77	10,902.5	4,209.5
Clifton Heights	Philadelphia	PA	6,863	0.63	1.63	10,893.7	4,203.9
Baldwin Park	Los Angeles	CA	72,176	6.63	17.18	10,886.3	4,203.2
Shrewsbury	New York City	NJ	1,076	0.10	0.26	10,868.7	4,196.4
Alhambra	Los Angeles	CA	82,868	7.63	19.76	10,860.8	4,193.4
Dormont	Pittsburgh	PA	8,244	0.76	1.97	10,847.4	4,186.0
Miami Beach	Miami	FL	82,890	7.69	19.92	10,774.7	4,160.1
Alexandria	Washington, D.C.	VA	159,467	14.9	38.7	10,681.0	4,122.7
Asbury Park	New York City	NJ	15,188	1.43	3.70	10,628.4	4,103.7
Kenmore	Buffalo	NY	15,205	1.44	3.72	10,588.4	4,088.2
Norwalk	Los Angeles	CA	102,773	9.71	25.14	10,584.2	4,086.6
New Brunswick	New York City	NJ	55,266	5.233	13.553	10,561.1	4,077.6
Upper Darby (Note: This Pennsylvania municipality, although officially bearing the name "Township", is actually a home rule municipality which is not subject to the Pennsylvania Township Code. However, the U.S. Census Bureau does not recognize home rule municipalities as a separate category of incorporated place; therefore, it is sometimes not regarded as "incorporated" by the U.S. Census Bureau. See the explanation above in the first note for why it is included in this list of incorporated places.)	Philadelphia	PA	85,681	7.83	20.27	10,559.6	4,076.9
Gardena	Los Angeles	CA	61,027	5.83	15.10	10,467.8	4,041.6
**Providence**	Providence	RI	190,934	18.41	47.67	10,373.5	4,005.3
Hialeah	Miami	FL	223,109	21.58	55.89	10,338.2	3,991.5
Collingdale	Philadelphia	PA	8,908	0.87	2.25	10,250.9	3,955.7
Surfside	Miami	FL	5,689	0.56	1.44	10,213.6	3,941.0
West Miami	Miami	FL	7,233	0.71	1.84	10,201.7	3,939.1
Norristown	Philadelphia	PA	35,748	3.52	9.10	10,170.1	3,926.4
Emeryville	Bay Area	CA	12,905	1.27	3.30	10,161.4	3,923.3
Lynbrook	New York City	NY	20,438	2.01	5.21	10,153.0	3,920.4
Artesia	Los Angeles	CA	16,395	1.62	4.20	10,120.4	3,907.5
West Chester	Philadelphia	PA	18,671	1.85	4.78	10,114.3	3,904.7
San Fernando	Los Angeles	CA	23,946	2.37	6.15	10,103.8	3,901.1
Evanston	Chicago	IL	78,110	7.78	20.15	10,041.1	3,876.9
Mount Oliver	Pittsburgh	PA	3,394	0.34	0.878	10,011.8	3,860.1

=== Census-designated places ===
The following is a list of unincorporated census-designated places with population densities of over 10,000 people per square mile as of the 2010 U.S. Census. The rank column indicates the rank the place would have if census-designated places were included in the above table of incorporated places.

Rank	Census-designated place	Metropolitan area	State	Population (2010 census)	Land area (mi^{2})	Population density (people per mi^{2})
1	Friendship Heights Village	Washington, D.C.	Maryland	4,512	0.06	81,991.7
12	Bellerose Terrace	New York City	New York	2,157	0.10	22,212.2
13	Walnut Park	Los Angeles	California	16,180	0.74	21,919.0
16	Lennox	Los Angeles	California	22,950	1.08	21,257.5
19	Langley Park	Washington, D.C.	Maryland	16,214	0.82	19,678.8
26	East Compton	Los Angeles	California	9,286	0.52	17,945.9
28	Westmont	Los Angeles	California	31,623	1.85	17,103.0
31	Florence-Graham	Los Angeles	California	60,197	3.58	16,799.7
32	East Los Angeles	Los Angeles	California	124,283	7.44	16,697.4
42	Loch Lomond	Miami	Florida	3,537	0.23	15,711.2
44	Ewa Gentry	Honolulu	Hawaii	4,939	0.32	15,627.7
50	Ramblewood East	Miami	Florida	1,395	0.09	14,932.7
57	Rollingwood	Bay Area	California	2,900	0.21	14,036.3
61	South San Jose Hills	Los Angeles	California	20,218	1.46	13,876.4
63	Franklin Park	Miami	Florida	943	0.07	13,817.5
66	Fontainebleau	Miami	Florida	59,549	4.40	13,524.7
69	North Fair Oaks	Bay Area	California	15,440	1.17	13,221.9
75	West Puente Valley	Los Angeles	California	22,589	1.75	12,908.0
76	Waipahu	Honolulu	Hawaii	33,108	2.57	12,882.8
79	Seven Corners	Washington, D.C.	Virginia	8,701	0.68	12,773.2
85	Isla Vista	Santa Barbara	California	23,096	1.86	12,417.2
92	Alum Rock	Bay Area	California	13,479	1.12	12,044.7
96	Ocean Grove	New York City	New Jersey	4,256	0.36	11,956.5
99	Cherryland	Bay Area	California	13,837	1.17	11,859.2
103	Citrus	Los Angeles	California	10,581	0.90	11,784.8
105	Burbank	Bay Area	California	5,239	0.45	11,748.6
118	Ashland	Bay Area	California	20,793	1.84	11,284.9
120	Bailey's Crossroads	Washington, D.C.	Virginia	23,166	2.05	11,276.0
124	Kendall West	Miami	Florida	38,034	3.39	11,218.6
139	Valinda	Los Angeles	California	21,776	2.01	10,830.8
141	Woodland Hills	Omaha	Nebraska	215	0.02	10,750.0
144	Huntington	Washington, D.C.	Virginia	8,325	0.78	10,665.6
149	Village Park	Honolulu	Hawaii	9,625	0.92	10,490.0
151	Arcadia University	Philadelphia	Pennsylvania	595	0.057	10,438.6
157	Ewa Beach	Honolulu	Hawaii	14,650	1.42	10,341.4
159	South Whittier	Los Angeles	California	55,193	5.38	10,257.7
165	Franklin Square	New York City	New York	29,342	2.89	10,169.2
171	Vincent	Los Angeles	California	15,097	1.50	10,039.3

=== New York City boroughs ===
The following lists the population densities of the five boroughs of New York City as of the 2020 U.S. Census. The rank column indicates the rank they would have if included in the above table of incorporated places. Staten Island has a population density below 10,000, but it is included for comparative purposes.

	Borough	Population (2020)	Land area (mi^{2})	Density (/mi^{2})
1	Manhattan	1,694,251	22.66	74,781.6
6	Brooklyn	2,736,074	69.38	39,437.8
7	The Bronx	1,472,654	42.17	34,920.2
16	Queens	2,405,464	108.72	22,124.5
–	Staten Island	495,747	57.52	8,618.1

=== Puerto Rico ===
The following lists the census-designated places in Puerto Rico that have a population density of over 10,000 people per square mile as of the 2000 U.S. Census. The census-designated places in Puerto Rico include zonas urbanas (urban areas) and comunidades (communities). The municipality, or municipio, the place is located in is also included in the table below. The municipalities are what is thought of as "incorporated places" in Puerto Rico because there are no subordinate governments within them, only eight electoral districts which hold no administrative functions (the electoral districts are what generally constitute the census-designated places in this list below). No municipalities have a density over 10,000 as of the 2000 U.S. Census; the San Juan Municipio is the densest at 9,084.4 people per square mile. The Jayuya municipality is not part of any metropolitan area as it is only part of the Jayuya micropolitan area (see Puerto Rico census statistical areas). The rank column indicates the rank the place would have if included in the above table of incorporated places.

Rank	Census-designated place	Metropolitan area	Municipality	Population (2000 census)	Land area (mi^{2})	Population density (people per mi^{2})
43	San Isidro	San Juan	Canóvanas	8,071	0.57	14,057.8
52	Levittown	San Juan	Toa Baja	30,140	2.27	13,279.1
53	Suárez	San Juan	Loíza	2,276	0.17	13,189.1
64	Vieques	San Juan	Loíza	4,325	0.34	12,579.2
69	Campanilla	San Juan	Toa Baja	7,757	0.63	12,328.4
105	El Ojo	Ponce	Santa Isabel	1,713	0.16	11,034.4
110	Aguada	Aguadilla	Aguada	3,871	0.36	10,877.8
115	San Juan	San Juan	San Juan	421,958	39.47	10,690.8
126	Peña Pobre	San Juan	Naguabo	1,024	0.10	10,308.7
127	Jayuya	—	Jayuya	3,516	0.34	10,218.4
136	Comerío	San Juan	Comerío	4,478	0.45	10,029.7

=== Northern Mariana Islands ===
In the Northern Mariana Islands, there is one place that has more than 10,000 people per square mile: China Town, Northern Mariana Islands (in the 2010 U.S. Census). The other non-Puerto Rico U.S. territories (American Samoa, Guam and the U.S. Virgin Islands) do not have any places with more than 10,000 people per square mile (as of the 2010 U.S. Census). China Town, Northern Mariana Islands is a census-designated place; it is also a village within the larger municipality of Saipan. China Town would rank 105th if it were in the first table above.

Rank	Census-designated place	Metropolitan area	Municipality	Population (2010 Census)	Land area (mi^{2})	Population density (people per mi^{2})
105	China Town, MP	None	Saipan	1,274	?	10,901.7

== Distributions ==
The following distributions only include the 125 incorporated places with population densities over 10,000 people per square mile. They do not include the 36 census-designated places, the boroughs of New York City, or the 11 places in Puerto Rico with densities over 10,000.

=== Metropolitan areas ===
The following ranks United States metropolitan areas by the number of incorporated places with densities over 10,000 within them. If two or more metropolitan areas have the same number of incorporated places, as is the case of the eight metros with one place, the metro areas are ranked by the densest incorporated place within the metro area.

Rank	Metropolitan area	Principal city	10,000+ places	Densest incorporated place	Density
1	New York City	New York City	55	Guttenberg (NJ)	62,264.2
2	Greater Los Angeles Area	Los Angeles	27	Maywood	21,485.5
3	Philadelphia metropolitan area	Philadelphia	13	Millbourne	16,378.4
4	Miami metropolitan area	Miami	7	Sunny Isles Beach	22,098.9
5	Greater Boston	Boston	7	Somerville	19,652.0
6	Chicago Metropolitan Area	Chicago	7	Berwyn	14,664.4
7	San Francisco Bay Area	San Francisco/San Jose	6	San Francisco	17,246.4
8	Washington Metropolitan Area	Washington, D.C.	3	Mount Rainier (MD)	13,102.2
9	Pittsburgh metropolitan area	Pittsburgh	3	Dormont	10,847.4
11	Providence metropolitan area	Providence	2	Central Falls	18,913.7
10	Louisville-Jefferson County metropolitan area	Louisville	1	Poplar Hills	15,200.0
13	Buffalo-Niagara Falls metropolitan area	Buffalo	1	Kenmore	10,588.4
15	Metro Detroit	Detroit	1	Hamtramck	13,604.3

=== States and territories ===
The following ranks the 50 U.S. states, the District of Columbia, and the 5 inhabited U.S. territories by the number of incorporated places with densities over 10,000 people within them. The "10,000+ places" column only includes incorporated places, it does not include census-designated places (CDPs). If two or more states have the same number of places, as is the case of the 36 states that contain no incorporated places with a density over 10,000, the states are ranked by the densest incorporated place within the state. The density figures for the densest incorporated place within each state and territory are from the 2010 United States census, and all the data for this ranking is from the U.S. Census Bureau.

The first rank column ranks each state by the number of 10,000+ places in that state (New Jersey ranks first, California ranks second, etc.) The second rank column ranks the most densely populated place in each state or territory (Guttenberg, NJ ranks first, Kaser, NY ranks second, etc.)

Hawaii officially does not contain any incorporated places, as the city of Honolulu is coextensive with Honolulu County, which makes up the whole island of Oahu. When the U.S. Census Bureau ranks incorporated places by population, it usually includes the Honolulu census-designated place, which is the urban center of Honolulu, in its ranking of incorporated places. Therefore, for this list of the densest incorporated places by state, the Honolulu CDP is considered the densest incorporated place in Hawaii. The District of Columbia, Puerto Rico and the U.S. territories are also included in this list. Puerto Rico also officially does not contain any incorporated places, as the lowest form of local government in Puerto Rico are the municipios, which are equivalent to counties. For this ranking, the municipios are counted as the incorporated places in Puerto Rico, and the San Juan Municipio is the densest.

In American Samoa, each village is governed by a pulenu'u (the equivalent of a mayor) — as such, each village in American Samoa can be considered to be incorporated for the purposes of the table below. In the Northern Mariana Islands, each municipality (such as Saipan) is governed by a mayor, and so those municipalities can be considered incorporated — the villages in the Northern Mariana Islands are considered Census-Designated Places. In Guam, each village is governed by a mayor, and so those villages can be considered incorporated. For the purposes of the table below, the major towns of the U.S. Virgin Islands (Charlotte Amalie, Frederiksted and Christiansted) are considered to be incorporated. (Note: Data for the U.S. territories is from the U.S. Census "American FactFinder".)

Note: this table contains data from the 2010 U.S. Census — because of this, data is more than 15 years old, and the current population density of each jurisdiction may have changed since then.

Rank (number of 10,000+ places)	State, federal district or territory	10,000+ places	Densest incorporated place	Density (people per sq. mile)	Rank (most dense place)
1	New Jersey	33	Guttenberg	62,264.2	1
2	California	33	Maywood	21,485.5	3
3	(New York (state)) New York	23	Kaser	31,924.4	2
4	Pennsylvania	13	Millbourne	16,378.4	7
5	Florida	7	Sunny Isles Beach	22,098.9	4
6	Massachusetts	7	Somerville	19,652.0	5
7	Illinois	7	Berwyn	14,664.4	9
9	Kentucky	1	Poplar Hills	15,200.0	6
8	Rhode Island	2	Central Falls	18,913.7	8
10	Maryland	1	Mount Rainier	13,102.2	10
11	Texas	1	Mobile City	9,466.7	11
12	District of Columbia	1	Washington	11,367.0	12
13	Oregon	1	Johnson City	8,292.3	13
14	Michigan	1	Hamtramck	13,604.3	14
15	Ohio	1	Lakewood	9,190.3	15
16	Missouri	0	Velda City	7,288.3	16
17	Puerto Rico	0	San Juan	9,084.4	17
18	Minnesota	0	Landfall	12,772.7	18
19	(Washington (state)) Washington	0	Seattle	8,791.8	19
20	Connecticut	0	Bridgeport	9,253.9	20
21	Wisconsin	0	Shorewood	8,716.4	21
22	U.S. Virgin Islands	0	Charlotte Amalie	8,552.0	22
23	Virginia	0	Alexandria	10,681.0	23
24	Colorado	0	Glendale	8,121.5	24
25	American Samoa	0	Faleniu	7,741.2	25
26	Delaware	0	Bellefonte	6,920.9	26
27	(Georgia (U.S. state)) Georgia	0	Clarkston	7,997.8	27
28	Arizona	0	Guadalupe	6,652.5	28
29	Nebraska	0	Omaha	3,658.4	29
30	Kansas	0	Westwood Hills	6,250.0	30
31	Utah	0	Kearns	7,929.8	31
32	Iowa	0	University Heights	5,339.1	32
33	Vermont	0	Winooski	5,592.3	33
34	Louisiana	0	Harahan	4,517.3	34
35	Idaho	0	Moscow	3,681.4	35
36	Hawaii	0	Honolulu	5,796.8	36
37	Nevada	0	Las Vegas	4,525.9	37
38	Oklahoma	0	The Village	3,743.3	38
39	Indiana	0	West Lafayette	3,884.0	39
40	Montana	0	Browning	3,688.4	40
41	Mississippi	0	Sidon	2,508.1	41
42	North Carolina	0	Carrboro	3,288.8	42
43	Guam	0	Mongmong-Toto-Maite	3,749.5	43
44	North Dakota	0	Fort Yates	2,933.3	44
45	Alabama	0	Homewood	3,197.1	45
46	West Virginia	0	St. Albans	3,004.4	46
47	Arkansas	0	Cammack Village	2,749.1	47
48	New Hampshire	0	Manchester	3,497.1	48
49	Wyoming	0	Jackson	3,633.9	49
50	Maine	0	Portland	3,175.9	50
51	New Mexico	0	Anthony	3,220.8	51
52	South Dakota	0	Sioux Falls	2,434.2	52
53	South Carolina	0	Tega Cay	2,859.2	53
54	Tennessee	0	East Ridge	2,676.5	54
55	Alaska	0	Kiana	2,352.6	55
56	Northern Mariana Islands	0	Saipan (Note: The village of China Town, Northern Mariana Islands has a population density of 10,901.7 people per square mile, but this village is a Census-Designated place, and so it is not considered incorporated.)	1,050.8	56

=== Populations ===
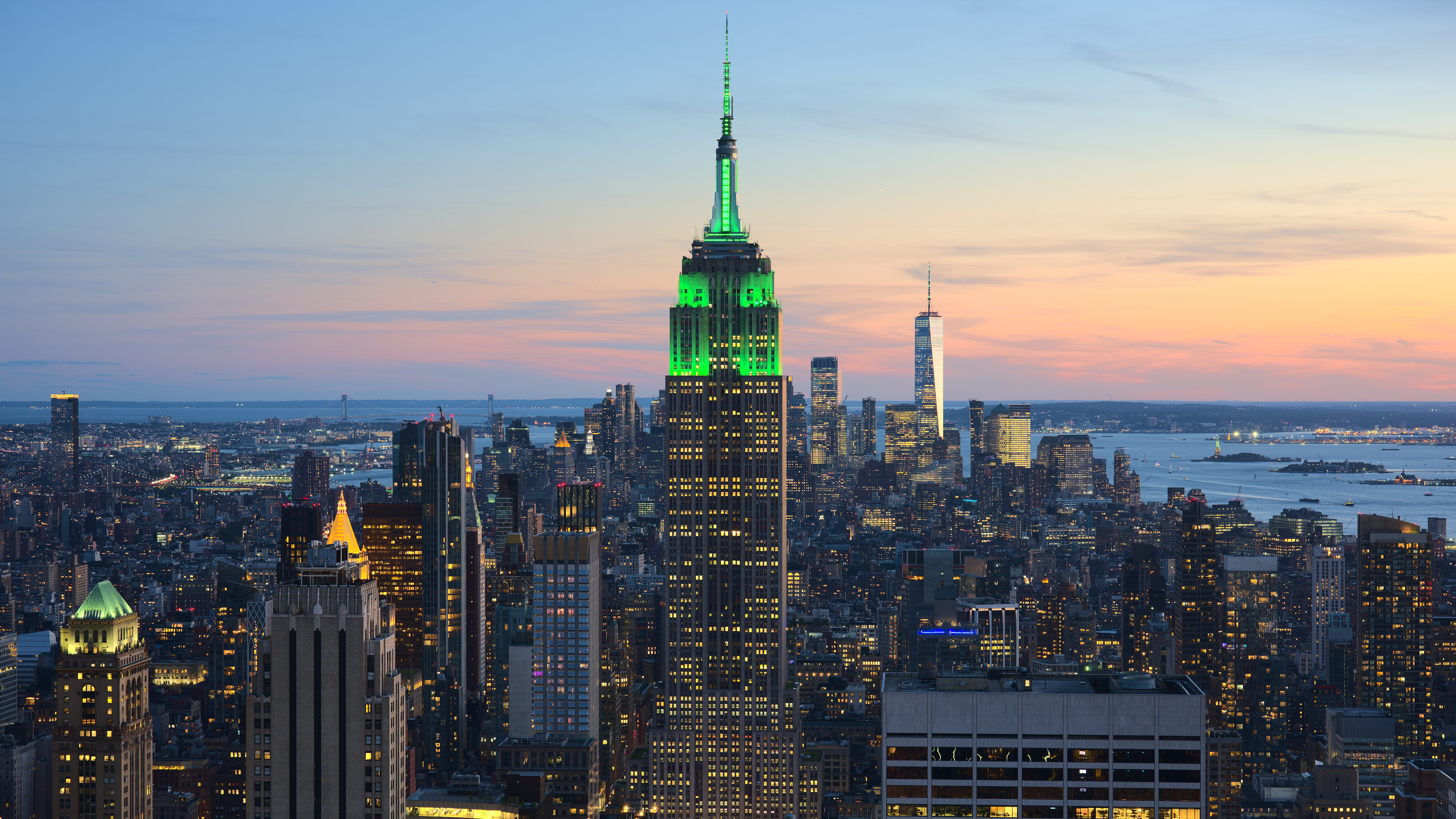
A view of portions of Midtown and Lower Manhattan in New York City, with Brooklyn visible in the background, taken from 30 Rockefeller Plaza's observation deck

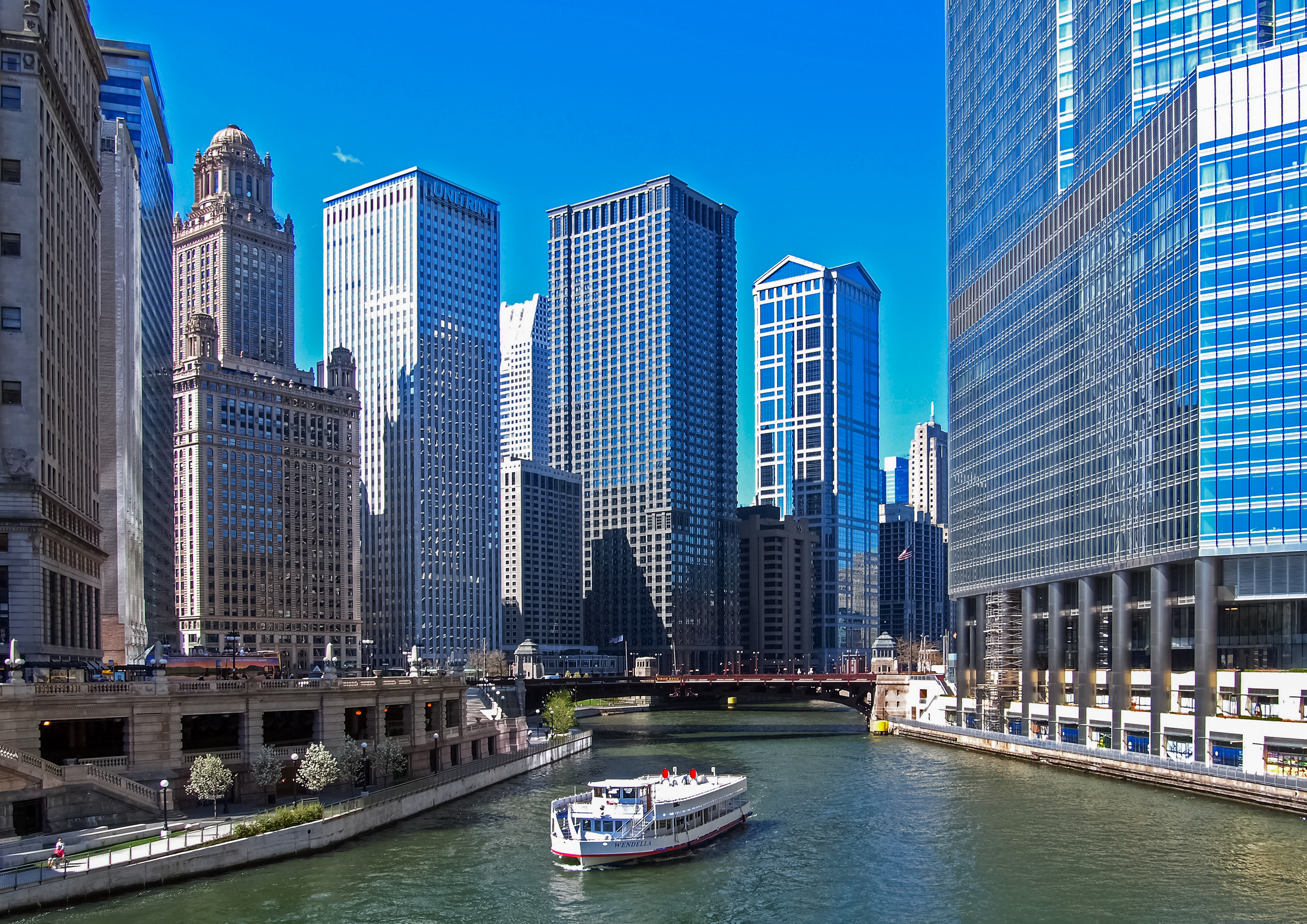
A ferry on the Chicago River

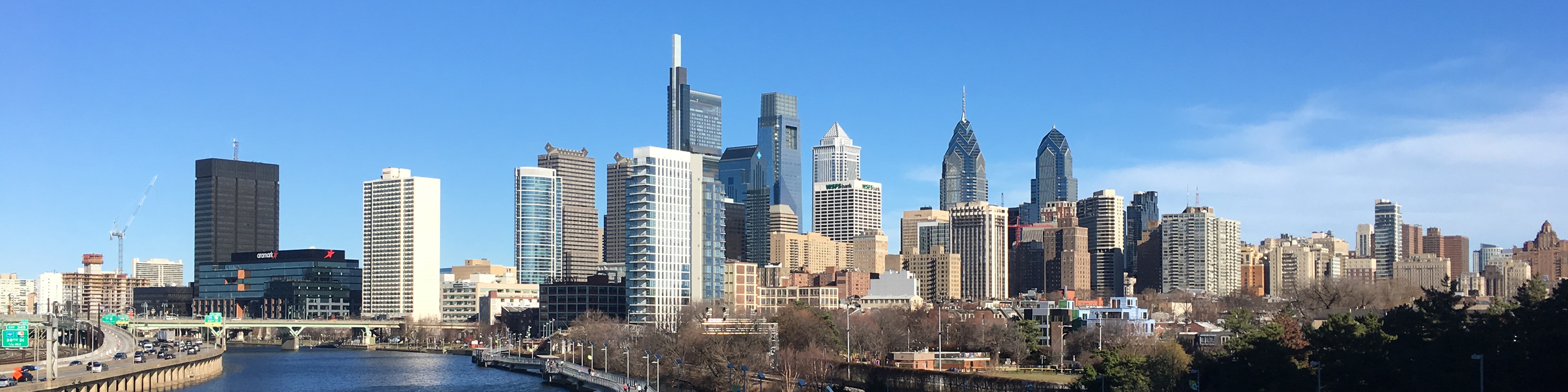
The skyscrapers of Center City, Philadelphia, the downtown part of the city, from the South Street Bridge

New York City, Chicago, and Philadelphia are the only incorporated places in the United States that have a population over 1,000,000 and a population density over 10,000 people per square mile.

Population	10,000+ incorporated places
1,000,000+	3
100,000 – 999,999	14
50,000 – 99,999	29
10,000 – 49,999	48
1,000 – 9,999	26
0 – 999	5

=== Land areas ===
Land area (mi^{2})	10,000+ incorporated places
100.00+	3
10.00 – 99.99	8
5.00 – 9.99	23
2.50 – 4.99	20
1.00 – 2.49	33
0.00 – 0.99	38

=== Population densities ===
Population density	10,000+ incorporated places
30,000.0+	4
20,000.0 – 29,999.9	10
15,000.0 – 19,999.9	23
12,000.0 – 14,999.9	33
11,000.0 – 11,999.9	29
10,000.0 – 10,999.9	26

== See also ==
- United States of America
  - Outline of the United States
  - Index of United States-related articles
  - United States Census Bureau
    - Demographics of the United States
      - List of U.S. states and territories by population
      - List of U.S. cities by population
  - United States Office of Management and Budget
    - Statistical area (United States)
      - Combined statistical area (list)
      - Core-based statistical area (list)
        - Metropolitan statistical area (list)
        - Micropolitan statistical area (list)
  - List of United States urban areas – lists contiguous urban areas without regard to municipal boundaries, includes the population density of each urban area
  - County statistics of the United States – includes a list of the 50 most densely populated counties
  - List of U.S. states by population density
- Worldwide
  - List of cities by population density
  - List of countries and dependencies by population density
  - List of the most densely populated country subdivisions
