= WOR TV Tower =

Former broadcast tower in North Bergen, New Jersey, USA

Coordinates: 40.797859°N 74.009528°W

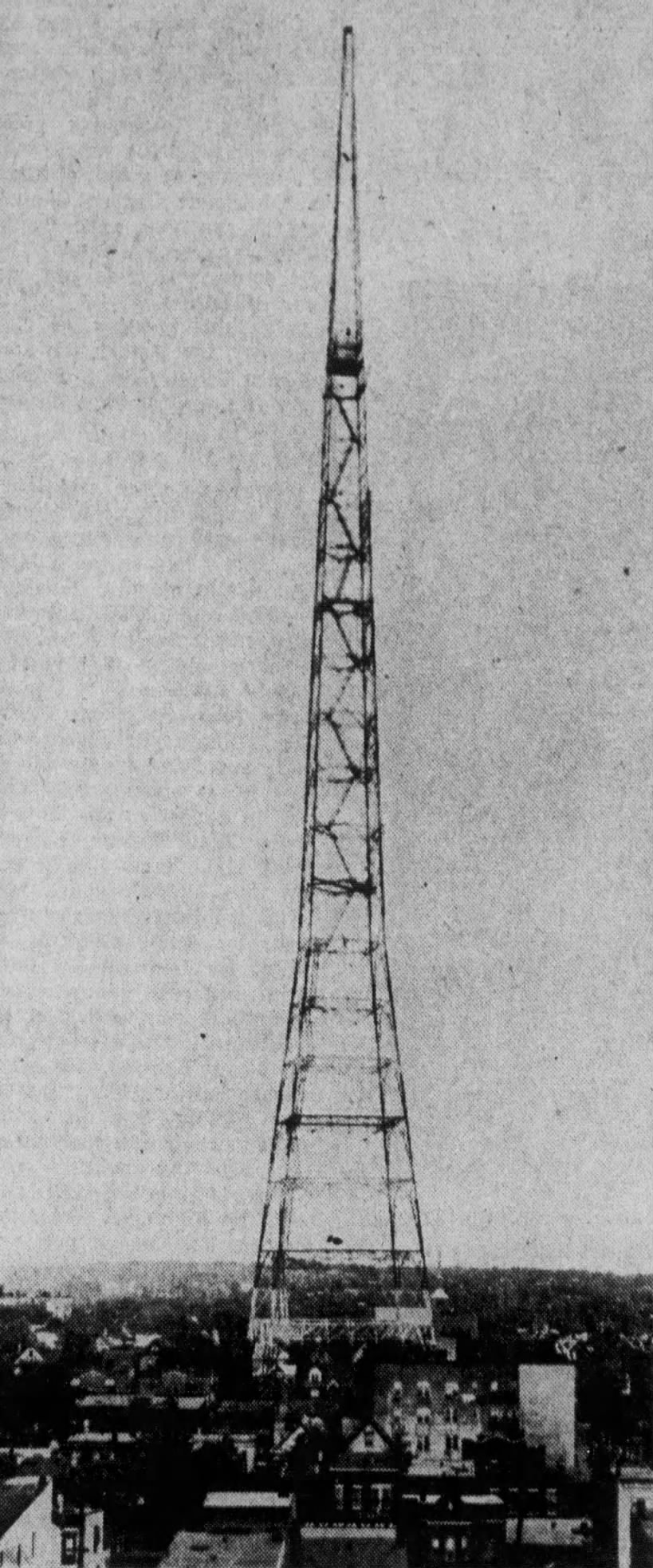
- The tower c. 1954
- Interactive map of the WOR TV Tower area

General information
- Location: North Bergen, New Jersey
- Year built: 1949
- Demolished: November 15, 1956

The WOR TV Tower was a 760-foot-tall (230-meter) lattice tower used for FM- and TV-broadcasting by WOR-FM and WOR-TV at North Bergen, New Jersey, USA. The 420-ton tower was built in 1949. At the time of its construction, it was the tenth-tallest man-made structure in the world. At the beginning of 1953, FM transmissions were stopped and TV transmissions were moved to the Empire State Building, but the tower remained standing. On November 8, 1956, the top of the tower was hit by a Beechcraft Model 18, which knocked off the tower's top; the plane subsequently crashed and killed four people. The tower was dismantled shortly afterwards.

== See also ==
- List of tallest buildings in North Hudson
- List of towers
- List of famous transmission sites
