= Galaxy Towers =

Residential complex in Guttenberg, New Jersey, U.S.

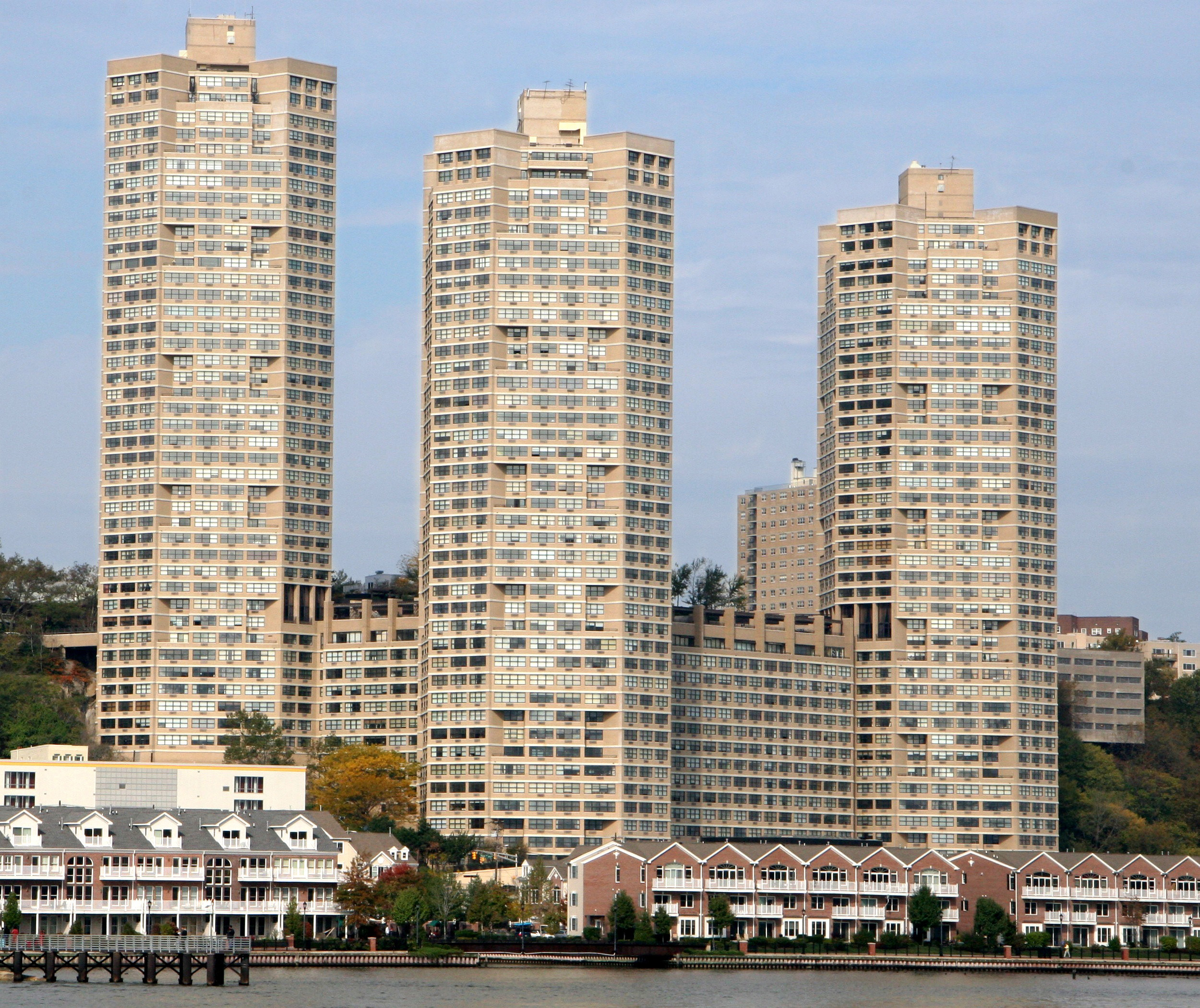
- Interactive map of the Galaxy Towers area

General information
- Location: 7000 Kennedy Boulevard East
- Coordinates: 40.79046°N 74.000205°W
- Completed: 1976
- Opened: 1976

Height
- Height: 415

Technical details
- Floor count: 44

Design and construction
- Architects: Gruzen & Partners

Website
- https://www.thegalaxytowers.com

Galaxy Towers, also known as the Galaxy Towers Condominium Association or GTCA, are a trio of 415 feet (126 m) octagonal towers located at 7000 Kennedy Boulevard East in the southeastern corner of Guttenberg, New Jersey, United States, overlooking the Hudson River. The towers were built in 1976 by a partnership of Norman Belfer, a Long Island developer who owned another high-rise in Guttenberg, and the Prudential Insurance Company of America. It began as a rental apartment complex but was converted to condominiums in 1980. It contains a mixture of condominiums, retail, and office space, including 1,075 apartments. The brutalist-style complex was designed by Gruzen & Partners and developed by Prudential Insurance Company. As of the 2010 Census, one-fifth of Guttenberg's residents live in the Galaxy.

== History ==
=== Construction and neighborhood ===
The complex is built on the Hudson Palisades at former site of White Brewery.

The Galaxy Towers were built in 1976 by a partnership of Norman Belfer, a Long Island developer who owned another high-rise in Guttenberg, and the Prudential Insurance Company of America. The Galaxy Towers' 1,075 residential units consist of three 44-story towers and two 16-story connecting structures. Most of the complex's apartments offer spectacular, unobstructed views of the Manhattan skyline, a feature enhanced by the octagonal shape of the buildings and their staggered configuration along the river.

Its location on the Hudson River in Guttenberg was said to be both its greatest advantage and its biggest drawback. The fact that the Towers has been likened to a self-contained city within a town that is only four blocks long has plagued the Galaxy's owners from the building's inception. Its unusual status made it difficult to rent units when they were merely apartments and remained a challenge when selling them after the conversion to condominiums was approved in 1980. Because the Galaxy began as a rental project that subsequently converted to condominium ownership, the Galaxy has had the marketing problem of tenants who elected not to buy their apartments, but whose occupancy hinders their sale to the public. In addition, environmentalists objected to their construction because they obstructed views of the Hudson Palisades.

The towers' $3.3 million in real estate taxes exceeds what Guttenberg collects from the rest of the property in town by more than $1 million. As of November 2011, one-fifth of the town's population lives in the Towers, though reporter Stephen LaMarca incorrectly stated in the Hudson Reporter that 'most' of the town's population lives in the towers.

During the first few years the Galaxy was open, its 57 different apartment models, each with an odd-shaped floor plan dictated by its location in the beehive of its tower, rented for an average of $800. However, there was not a sufficient market for luxury apartments in Guttenberg, and by 1979, less than half of the first two towers had been rented. The interior of the third tower, the last to be built, had not been completed and the building was vacant until demand caught up with supply. That same year, Belfer dissolved his partnership with Prudential, due to differences between the two. Prudential took over the complex and made some improvements, including the installation of new windows, renovation of the lobby and hallways, and the purchase of a 17-acre parcel of waterfront land below the Galaxy that had been used for the processing and storage of peanut oil. Rents were restructured between 1979 and 1980, resulting in an increase of more than 300 tenants before approval was granted in 1980 for conversion to condominium ownership.

The first apartments were sold to residents in October 1980. Sales were opened to the public the following January. By July 1983, nearly 700 of the 1,075 units were sold, about 150 of which are rentals occupied by tenants who lived there before the conversion, 70% of whom originated in Manhattan. Among the units not yet sold by 1983 were the complex's largest and most exclusive units, including a fully decorated and furnished $545,000 USD 3-bedroom penthouse, which went on sale that year.

Access to the Galaxy is via the garage entrances and a circular tree-lined driveway known as "The Plaza" at Boulevard East on top of the Hudson Palisades . The recreational facilities include two pools, an exercise room, an indoor game room, a child entertainment room, a whirlpool and saunas.

Galaxy Mall Plaza is a two-level mall located beneath the three buildings on Boulevard East. In addition to a number of different stores, and dining establishments, it was the location of the 500-seat Galaxy TriPlex movie theater, which was built in 1977, and whose operational status changed numerous times over the next quarter century. It closed one year after it opened, and remained unused for a decade, until it was reopened in 1987 by owner Nelson Page of Majestic Entertainment. It initially failed to find a devoted audience, but when it changed to a discount house, it saw success. Its houses were increased to three in 1989, and it developed a reputation for eclectic programming at affordable prices. In addition to first-run features, The Galaxy hosted a regular silent film series. The Galaxy TriPlex was the location of a five-week Coming Attractions program hosted by film critic Jeffrey Lyons, and the annual Black Maria Film Festival. The theater ultimately closed in 2007. It was one of four theaters of Nelson's that closed for economic reasons, along with The Valley View Cinemas in Wayne, the Hudson Street Cinemas in Hoboken and the Cedar Lane Cinemas in Teaneck. It was converted into office space.

=== 21st century ===
In 2006, Mike Deluca, a resident and former board member at the Galaxy Tower, started a website, Galaxyfacts, after he came to feel that he had been denied the opportunity to voice his concerns at Galaxy Towers Condo Association (GTCA) board meetings regarding what he felt were the questionable backgrounds of partners in the company doing proposed renovations to the Towers. Deluca, who opposed the GTCA Board, quickly gained supporters with the site, which focuses on various local lawsuits, conflicts and other issues. In 2004, Deluca had formed the Concerned Unit Owners Group (CUOG), whose members met in an online Yahoo! chat room to voice their concerns. The chat room, however, was shut down after the board hired an attorney, who successfully convinced Yahoo! that it violated their terms of service. After creating Galaxyfacts, he added a message board to be used by former CUOG members. In 2007 Deluca organized a successful petition calling for the recall of three of nine board members. The recall was successful, and following an election, two of Deluca's allies, including current GTCA Board President Slava Lerner, were voted in. However, Deluca found that many of the problems with the former board only worsened when his allies took power, as the new members he helped get elected continued to "shut him out". Deluca successfully ran for the board in 2008, and remained on the board for a year. Despite this, he continued to feel that his points of view were not being heard, and quit to focus on Galaxyfacts. After five years, Galaxyfacts grew into a thriving message board, visited mainly by residents of the Towers, though both the website and the board have their supporters. Among the issues discussed on the site are the August 2011 laying off of 60 unionized, long-time Galaxy employees due to outsourcing, the October 2011 approval of condominiums near a local gas pipeline by the Hudson County Planning Board, and a racial discrimination lawsuit filed against the GTCA by two employees of the Galaxy's spa.

In approximately September 2009, anonymous users of the website began accusing GTCA President Slava Lerner, who was running for reelection as president, of improprieties with Galaxy funds, and made what Deluca described as "nasty personal attacks". That December Lerner filed petition in New Jersey Superior Court asking for an order that would allow him to gain the identity of the posters through Deluca's computer and website. Lerner won the election on March 10, 2010, and a judge denied Lerner's petition the following month.

A number of people have jumped from the Towers. The most recent occurred on May 8, 2014, when a woman jumped to her death from Tower I.

On December 27, 2014, an 80-year-old Tower resident accidentally crashed his car through a concrete wall on the 12th floor in the complex's parking lot, penetrating into a ventilation shaft, where the car fell seven stories to the fifth floor. Because the interior of the shaft contains fans on each floor to circulate air throughout the garage, the car hit each fan during its fall, which cushioned its fall. The man climbed out of the car's sunroof, but slipped and was wedged between the car and the wall of the shaft. He called 9-1-1, and waited there until emergency services arrived. The fire department used hydraulic rescue tools to push the car away from the wall in order to free the man, who was taken to Jersey City Medical Center for treatment, though notably, he had no major injuries.

On the morning of February 2, 2016, a 44-year-old elevator repair technician working for Slade Elevator was accidentally killed inside an elevator shaft of Tower II while doing scheduled monthly maintenance on that elevator. The worker became entangled between the elevator door and the upper portion of the elevator car and was dragged upwards. He was pronounced dead at the scene. While Occupational Safety and Health Administration embarked on an investigation to determine the worker's official cause of death, the building's management stated publicly that while there was no indication that this was caused by an elevator malfunction, the elevators would be operated entirely by attendants, and their automatic functions suspended, until their safety could be verified through inspection.

On July 31, 2018, the North Bergen Library opened the Guttenberg Resource Center inside the Galaxy Towers Mall, to address the needs of those who did not live near any of the North Bergen Library's other branches. The Center was also intended to provide an attractive space for children to socialize, and a meeting place for senior citizens, where services including ESL classes, citizenship exam preparation, and career assistance would be offered. According to North Bergen Mayor Nicholas Sacco and North Bergen Library Director Sai Rao, the opening represented the first time in New Jersey that one municipality opened a library branch in another.

== Appearances in media ==
In the 2012 National Geographic Channel documentary Comic Store Heroes, which follows the staff and customers at Midtown Comics in Manhattan, Midtown pricing expert Alex Rae is tasked to find a rare comic book. Among the locales to which his search brings him is the Galaxy Towers, where a resident of the Towers with a large comics collection is consulted as to whether he owns a copy of the book.

== See also ==
- List of tallest buildings in North Hudson
