= Schuetzen Park (New Jersey) =

Private park in Hudson County, New Jersey, US

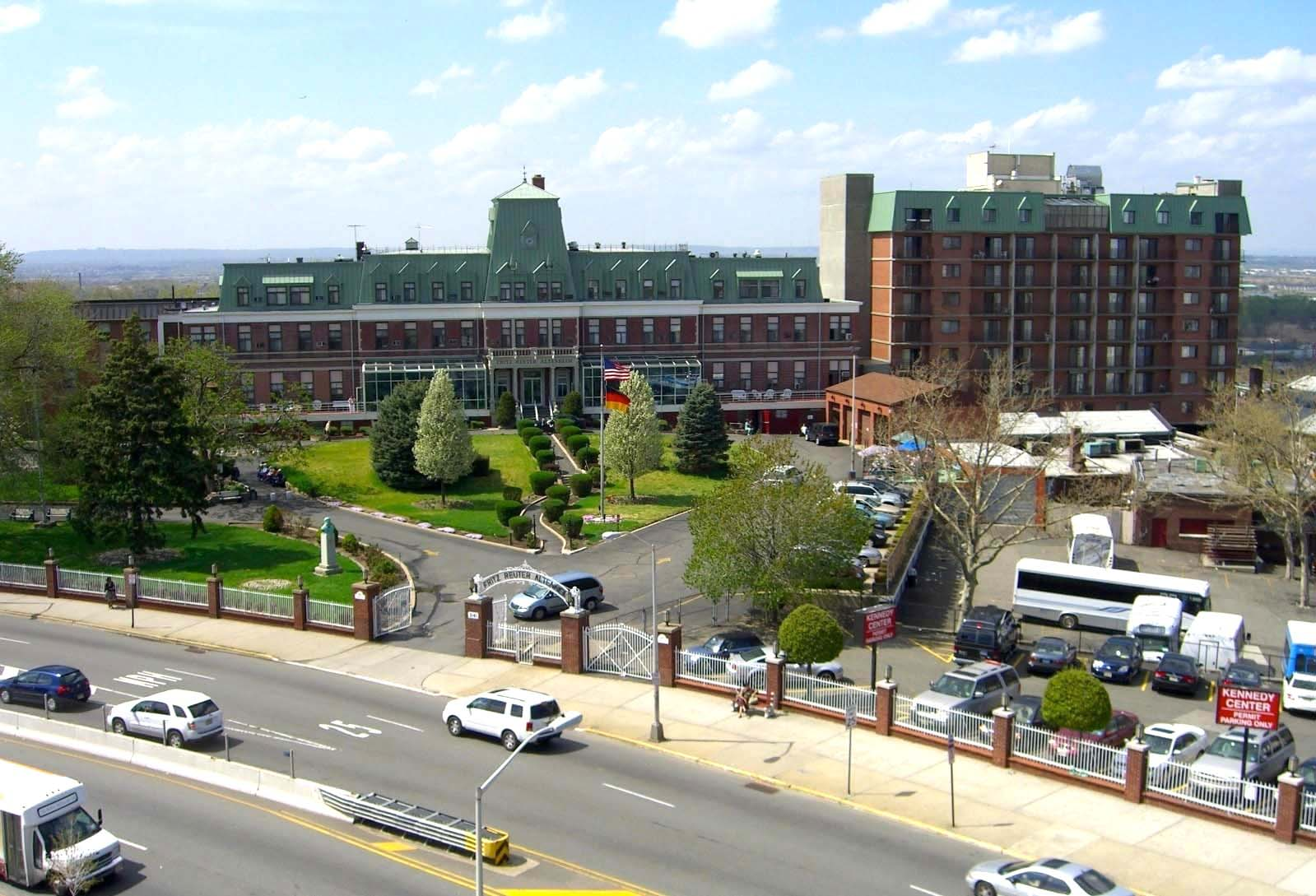
- Fritz Reuter Altenheim and Schuetzen Park
- Interactive map of Schuetzen Park
- Location: North Bergen, New Jersey
- Coordinates: 40.777°N 74.036°W
- Area: 3 acres (1.2 ha)
- Created: 1874

Schuetzen Park is a privately owned park in North Bergen, New Jersey, United States, that has existed since 1872 and is located on the ridge of the Hudson Palisades at Kennedy Boulevard and Bergen Turnpike just north of the Marginal Highway. Its southern and western perimeters are shared with the Fritz Reuter Altenheim, a retirement community named for the German author, Fritz Reuter, and Columbia Park, a large shopping center. The German-American Volksfest has taken place there annually since its construction.

== History ==
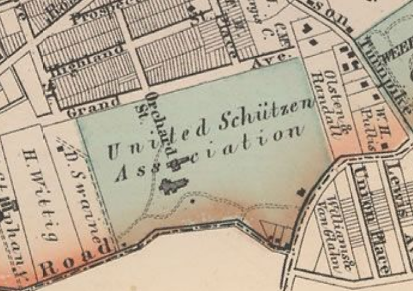
From an 1873 map of North Bergen, using the English translation of Schützenverein, or marksman's club, showing original extent of grounds. The park today is located at triangle, lower right.

In 1864, nearby Union Hill was set apart from North Bergen as a separate municipality that had been originally settled by a group of German-Americans as early as 1851. In 1872, the United Schützen Association opened a park on the site of the "Old Mansion" of the Wright family (see 1873 map illustration), featuring a new dancing pavilion, music stand and shooting gallery in addition to the landscape elements and green houses "just as Mr. Wright left them." The Plattduetsche Volksfest Vereen organization of New York and New Jersey (PVV), which was created in 1874, purchased the property in 1894. It expanded into an amusement park that featured three dancing pavilions and ten bowling alleys, which entertained up to 50,000 attendees at a time with vaudeville performances and tournaments, parades, and fireworks. Schuetzen is a derivative of the German word Schütze, meaning "shooter" or "rifleman". Originally encompassing about 32 acres, the park's location on the western cuesta of the Hudson Palisades was chosen so that bullets could be directed into the side of the hill. Target practice continued at the park until 1935. Over the years much of the property was sold off, a large portion of which was acquired by the government to build Route 495 leading to the Lincoln Tunnel.

In a 1911 ad in which it is called Schützen Park, proprietor Fred Hager claimed it as the "largest park of its kind in New Jersey", offering 600 x 200 feet rifle ranges, 10 modern bowling alleys, and three dancing pavilions, which could accommodate roughly 50,000 people. The park also contained a variety of attractions, such as vaudeville performances, parades, fireworks and tournaments. The park was one of the venues in Hudson County that catered to the large German-speaking population. Armbruster's Schuetzen Park and Pohlmann's Hall, are among the many others. From 1945 to 1975, when the sports field was sold to a real estate developer, Schuetzen Park was the home of Hoboken FC 1912.

Today the park is used for banquets, weddings, receptions, and public sporting events such as boxing and mixed martial arts matches. The park, along with the retirement home, the Bergen Crest Mausoleum, the Garden State Crematory, and the many cemeteries that characterize the area along the western slope - Flower Hill Cemetery, Grove Church Cemetery, Hoboken Cemetery, Machpelah Cemetery and Weehawken Cemetery - constitute a string of green open spaces in North Hudson County. The German-American Volksfest has taken place there annually since 1874. Fears were expressed that the 2015 Volkfest may be the last, owing to the amount of club members who have moved away.

== Gallery ==
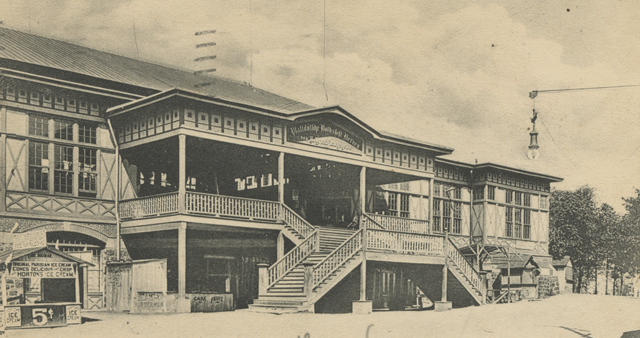
1907 postcard of the Festival Hall

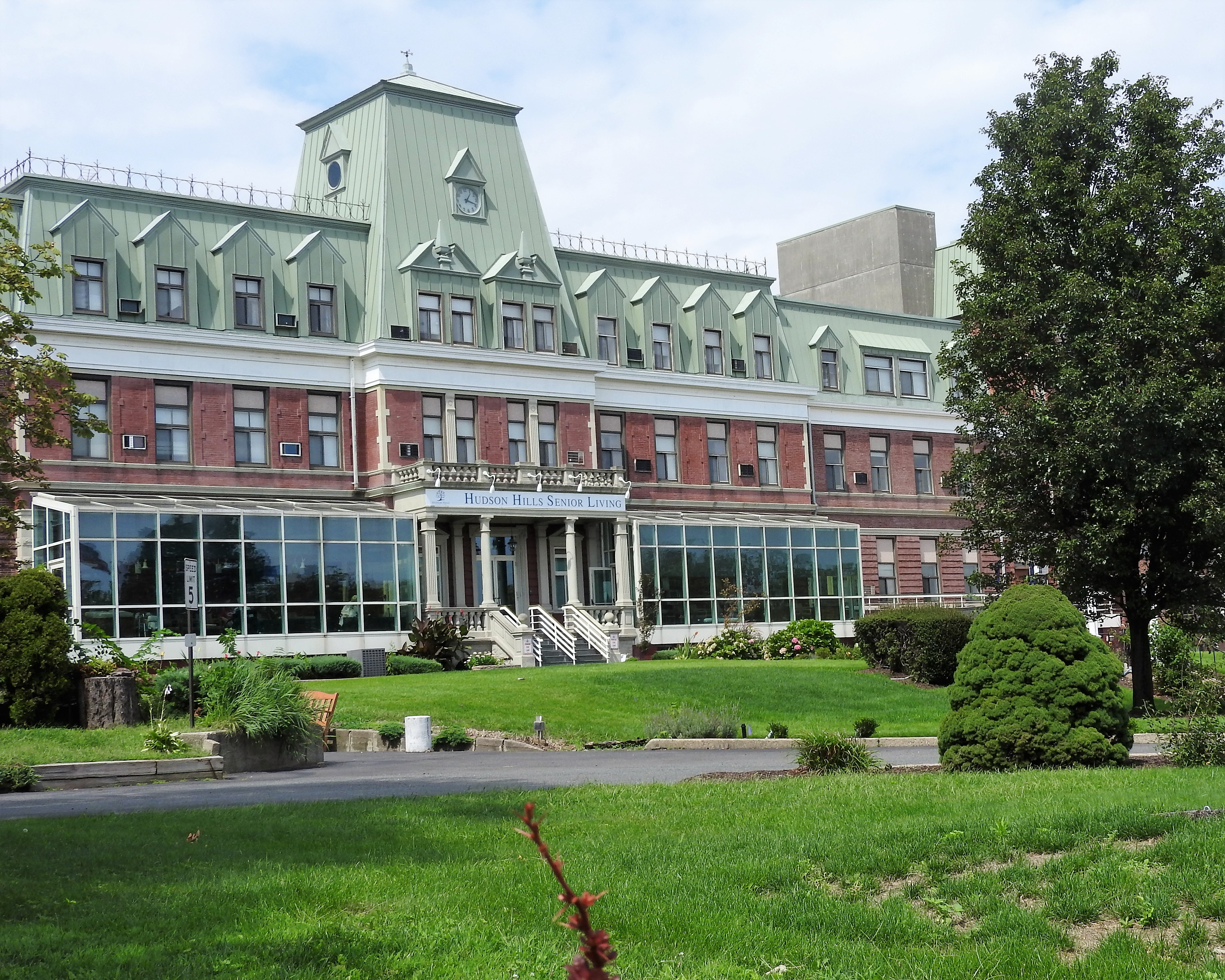
Fritz Reuter Altenheim, a retirement home since 1897

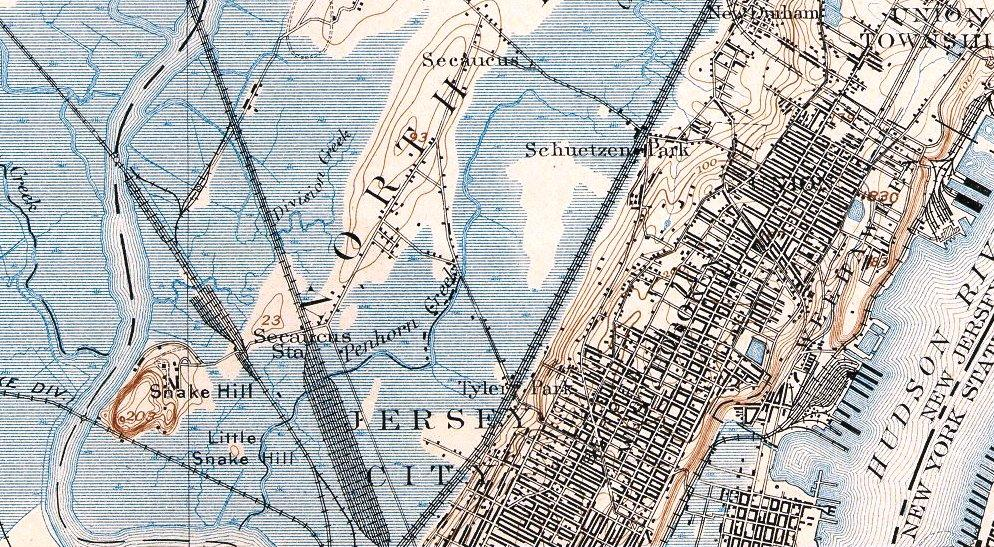
USGS Map from 1900 shows Schuetzen Park as a prominent landmark

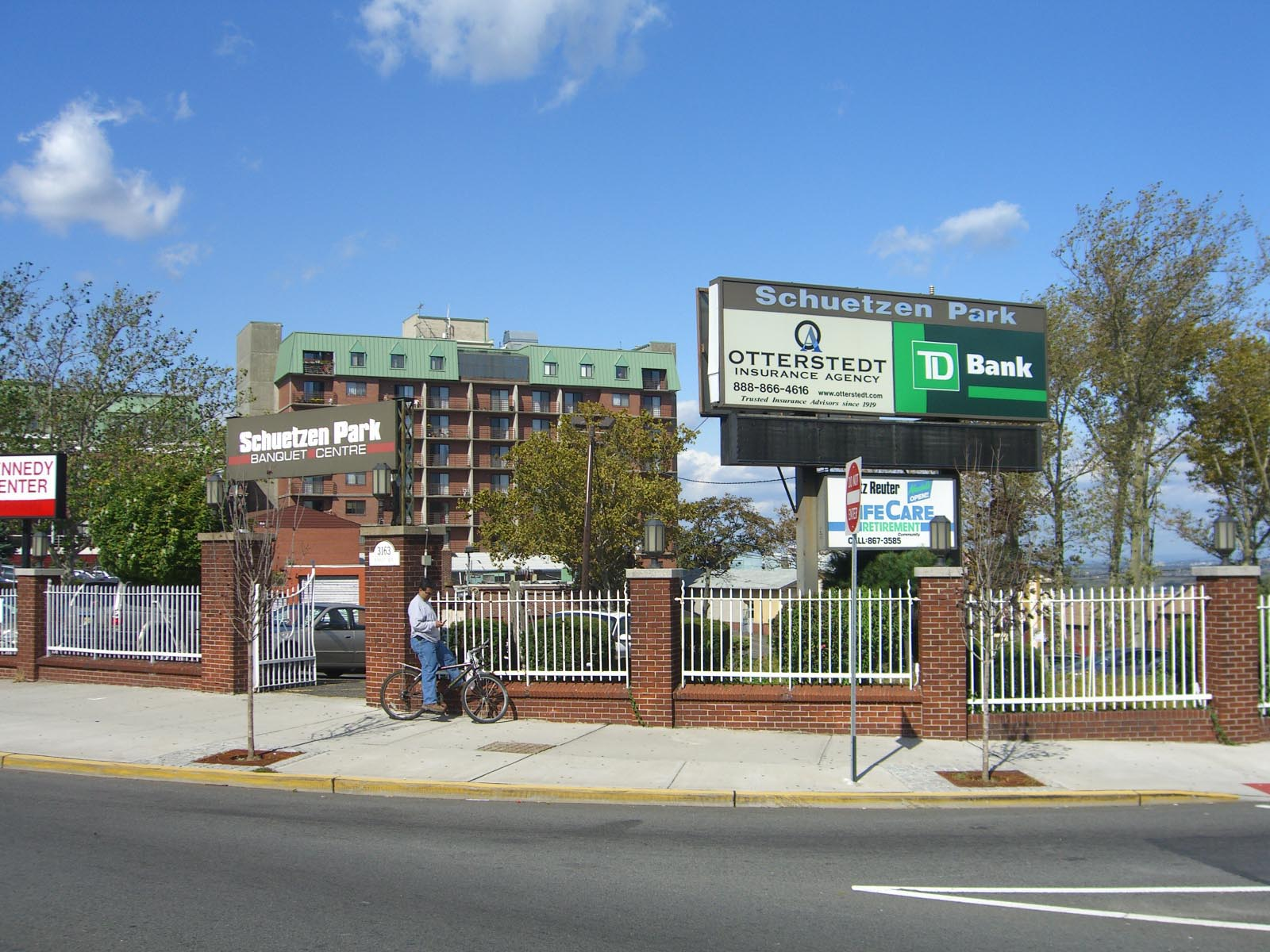
Schuetzen Park, as seen from Kennedy Boulevard

== See also ==
- Schützenverein
- List of neighborhoods in North Bergen, New Jersey
- Jersey City Armory
