= Bergen Crest Mausoleum =

Cemetery in North Bergen, New Jersey, US

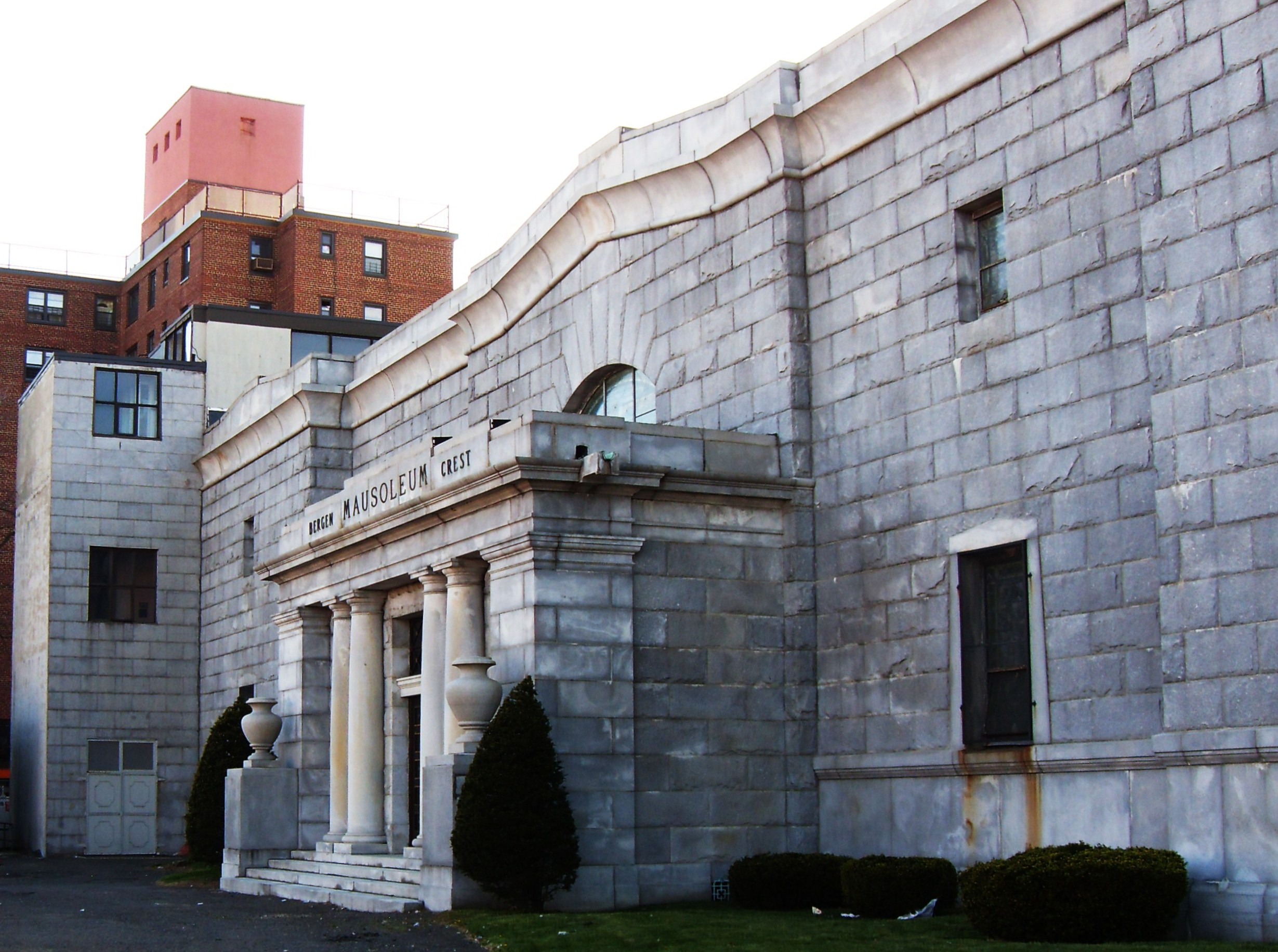
- View from the north side.
- Interactive map of Bergen Crest Mausoleum

Details
- Established: 1917
- Location: North Bergen, New Jersey
- Country: United States
- Coordinates: 40.7780°N 74.029°W
- Size: 33,000 square feet (3,100 m^{2})
- Find a Grave: Bergen Crest Mausoleum

Bergen Crest Mausoleum is a mausoleum in Hudson County, New Jersey.

== Location ==
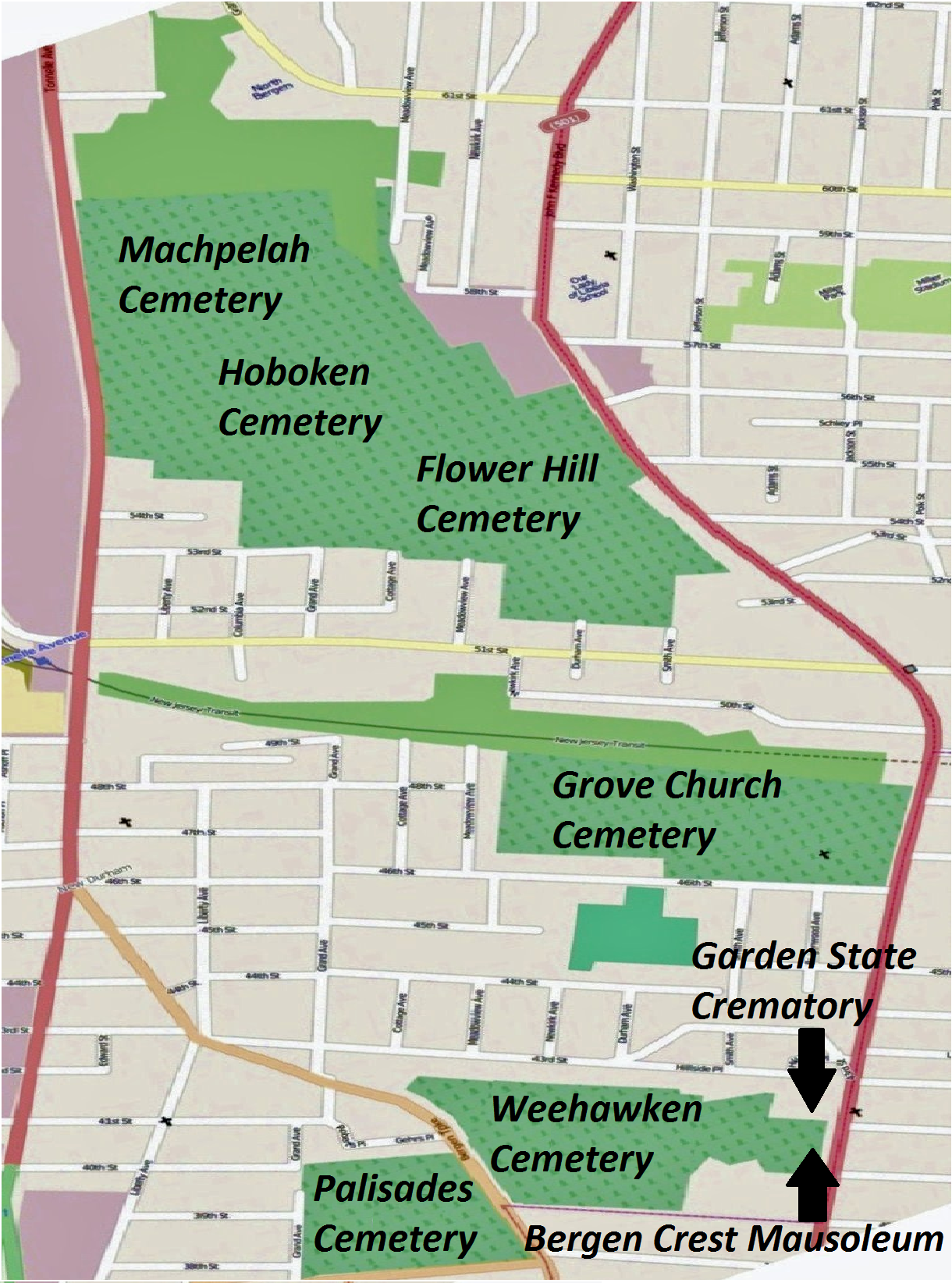
Bergen Crest Mausoleum is located atop the Palisades, east of Weehawken Cemetery.

Located at 4001 Kennedy Boulevard, the Bergen Crest Mausoleum is in town of North Bergen, New Jersey and is adjacent to the Garden State Crematory. Along the boulevard is the Grove Church Cemetery and Flower Hill Cemetery, as well as Schuetzen Park. It is roughly 33,000 square feet (3,100 m^{2}) and the entire property is roughly 0.75 acres (3,000 m^{2}).

== History ==
On March 27, 1917, plans were approved for the construction of a community mausoleum in North Bergen, Under the New York & New Jersey Mausoleum Association, the two-story granite and reinforced concrete building was estimated costing $150,000 and was designed by the architect Charles Fall, of the Hoboken Land and Improvement Company. The mausoleum takes its name from its position on Bergen Hill at the edge of the Hudson Palisades where they begin their descent to the west, overlooking Weehawken Cemetery and Palisades Cemetery.

Reported in the American Mercury journal and in The New York Times, on July 3, 1929, a crowd estimated to be between 10,000 and 12,000 people traveling from over northern New Jersey and New York had gathered around the mausoleum in awe at the "faintly shadowed likeness of the head of Christ which was discovered on the whitish gray stone front of the building". Policemen were dispatched to keep the crowd in order and off of the lawn as they looked on curiously. Some considered it to be a miracle, while others viewed it simply as weather markings.

== See also ==
- Hudson County Cemeteries

== Sources ==
- Hagstrom Map (2008). Hudson County New Jersey Street Map. Hagstrom Map Company, Inc. ISBN 978-0880977630.
- International Association of Bridge and Structural Iron Workers; International Association of Bridge, Structural, and Ornamental Iron Workers (1917). "The Bridgemen's magazine". 17. OCLC 9615234.
- Mencken, Henry Louis (1929). "The American mercury". 18. American Mercury Magazine. OCLC 1480417.
- State Dept. of Health (1918). "Annual report of the Department of Health of the State of New Jersey. 1917". New Jersey State Dept. of Health. OCLC 1759842.
- United States Internal Revenue Service (2003). "Cumulative list of organizations described in section 170 (c)". Internal Revenue Code of 1954. Dept. of the Treasury, Internal Revenue Service. ISSN 0499-6453. OCLC 2457127.
