= List of cemeteries in Hudson County, New Jersey =

List of the cemeteries in Hudson County, New Jersey

Counties in New Jersey
Atlantic - Bergen - Burlington - Camden - Cape May - Cumberland - Essex - Gloucester - Hudson - Hunterdon - Mercer - Middlesex - Monmouth - Morris - Ocean - Passaic - Salem - Somerset - Sussex - Union - Warren

Hudson County is home to many churches and cemeteries, some of which provide significant open areas in otherwise congested residential areas.

== History ==
There are some shared characteristics of cemeteries in North Bergen. In the Annual report of the National Board of Health in 1879 four cemeteries, historically Grove Church, Hoboken, Machpelah, and Weehawken, all lie on the western side of the Hudson Palisades which gives them similar soil deposits and somewhat uniquely, the presence of trap rock on the grounds. Their locations allow for good water drainage into the nearby Secaucus marshes with minimal contamination due to the steep grade of the hills. They were created in roughly the same time period. Two of the four cemeteries were split up, and now make a total of six unique cemeteries in the area; these cemeteries are all contained within a roughly one mile stretch of parallel roads Tonnelle Avenue and Kennedy Boulevard, constituting a string of green open spaces in North Hudson. In Jersey City, four cemeteries, namely Saint Peters', Holy Name, Jersey City, and New York Bay all provide the surrounding areas with long vistas and green open spaces as well. Finally, several burial grounds exist in Hudson County, some of which date back into colonial times are lost and possibly removed or built over.

Another characteristic of many cemeteries in Hudson County is that they host a large amount of civil war veteran graves.

== List ==
	Cemetery name	Image	Established	Type	Location	City or Town	Summary
1	African Burying Ground		1841	Defunct	Johnston Avenue at Pine; 40.7092°N 74.0579°W	Jersey City	
2	Abel I. Smith Burial Ground		1755	Defunct	Near Secaucus Road; 40°46′41″N 74°03′47″W	Secaucus	
3	Arlington Memorial Park		1865	Veteran	748 Schuyler Avenue; 40°46′21″N 74°07′56″W	Kearny	
4	Bayview – New York Bay Cemetery		1848		312 Garfield Avenue; 40°41′43″N 74°05′15″W	Jersey City	
5	Bergen Crest Mausoleum		1917	Mausoleum	4001 Kennedy Boulevard; 40°46′41″N 74°01′44″W	North Bergen	
6/7	Constable Hook Cemetery		1849		East 22nd Street; 40°39′27″N 74°06′25″W	Bayonne	
8	The Blue Chapel		1912		605 14th & West Streets; 40°45′41″N 74°02′16″W	West Hoboken now Union City	
9	Flower Hill Cemetery		1873		4001 Kennedy Boulevard; 40°47′18″N 74°01′30″W	North Bergen	
10	Garden State Crematory		1907	Crematory	4101 Kennedy Boulevard; 40°46′43″N 74°01′41″W	North Bergen	
10	Old Graveyard at Greenville		1821 or 1824	Defunct	Newark Bay Extension of the New Jersey Turnpike Exit 14C; 40°41′20″N 74°05′46″W	Jersey City	
11	Grove Church Cemetery		1847	Nosectarian	1132 46th Street and Kennedy Boulevard; 40°47′00″N 74°01′35″W	North Bergen	
12	Hoboken Cemetery		1871		5500 Tonnelle Avenue; 40°47′23″N 74°01′35″W	North Bergen	
13	Holy Name Cemetery		1866	Catholic	West Side Avenue; 40°43′54″N 74°04′46″W	Jersey City	
14	Hudson County Burial Grounds		1829	Defunct	Near Snake Hill; 40°45′42″N 74°04′30″W	Secaucus	
15	Jersey City and Harsimus Cemetery		1829		435 Newark Avenue; 40°43′38″N 74°03′17″W	Jersey City	
16	Machpelah Cemetery		1853	Sectarian	5810 Tonnelle Avenue; 40°47′33″N 74°01′35″W	North Bergen	
17	North Arlington Jewish Cemetery				Belleville Turnpike	Kearny and North Arlington	On the border of Arlington, Kearny, Hudson County and North Arlington, Bergen County
18	Old Bergen Church Cemetery		1660s		1 Highland Avenue; 40°43′38″N 74°04′02″W	Jersey City	
19	Palisades Cemetery		1982		Bergen Turnpike; 40°46′45″N 74°01′59″W	North Bergen	
20	Passionist Cemetery		1864	Defunct	2000 Summit Avenue; 40°45′56″N 74°02′14″W	West Hoboken now Union City	
21	Saint Peter's Cemetery		1849		Utica Street; 40°44′30″N 74°03′55″W	Jersey City	
22	Sandford Burying Ground					Kearny	
23	Speer Cemetery		1660s		Vroom Street; 40°43′42″N 74°04′04″W	Jersey City	
24	Van Buskirk Burial Ground		1736	Defunct	Constable Hook; 40°39′27″N 74°06′25″W	Bayonne	
25	Weehawken Cemetery		1867		4000 Bergen Turnpike; 40°46′46″N 74°01′49″W	North Bergen	

== See also ==
- Edgewater Cemetery
- Fairview Cemetery (Fairview, New Jersey)
- Mount Moriah Cemetery (Fairview, New Jersey)

== Sources ==
- Adams, Arthur G. (1996). The Hudson River Guidebook. Fordham University Press. pp. 430. ISBN 0-8232-1679-9.
- Hagstrom Map (2008). Hudson County New Jersey Street Map. Hagstrom Map Company, Inc. ISBN 978-0-88097-763-0.
- Hood, John (1877). "Index of colonial and state laws between the years 1663 and 1877 inclusive". J.L. Murphy, printer: 1136. OCLC 31641787.
- National Board of Health (1898). "Annual report". Board of Health. New Jersey State Dept. of Health: 388. OCLC 1759842.
- National Board of Health (1879). "Annual report of the National Board of Health". National Board of Health (U.S.). 1. G.P.O: 477. OCLC 17542545.
- Stratford, Dorothy A.; Riemer, Janet (October 1988). "Inventory of GSNJ Files of New Jersey Cemeteries" (PDF). The Genealogical Society of New Jersey (Hudson County): 1.
- Leonard, J.H. (1895), The Leonard Manual of the Cemeteries of New York and Vicinity, New York, J. H. Leonard
