= Grove Church Cemetery =

Cemetery in Hudson County, New Jersey, US

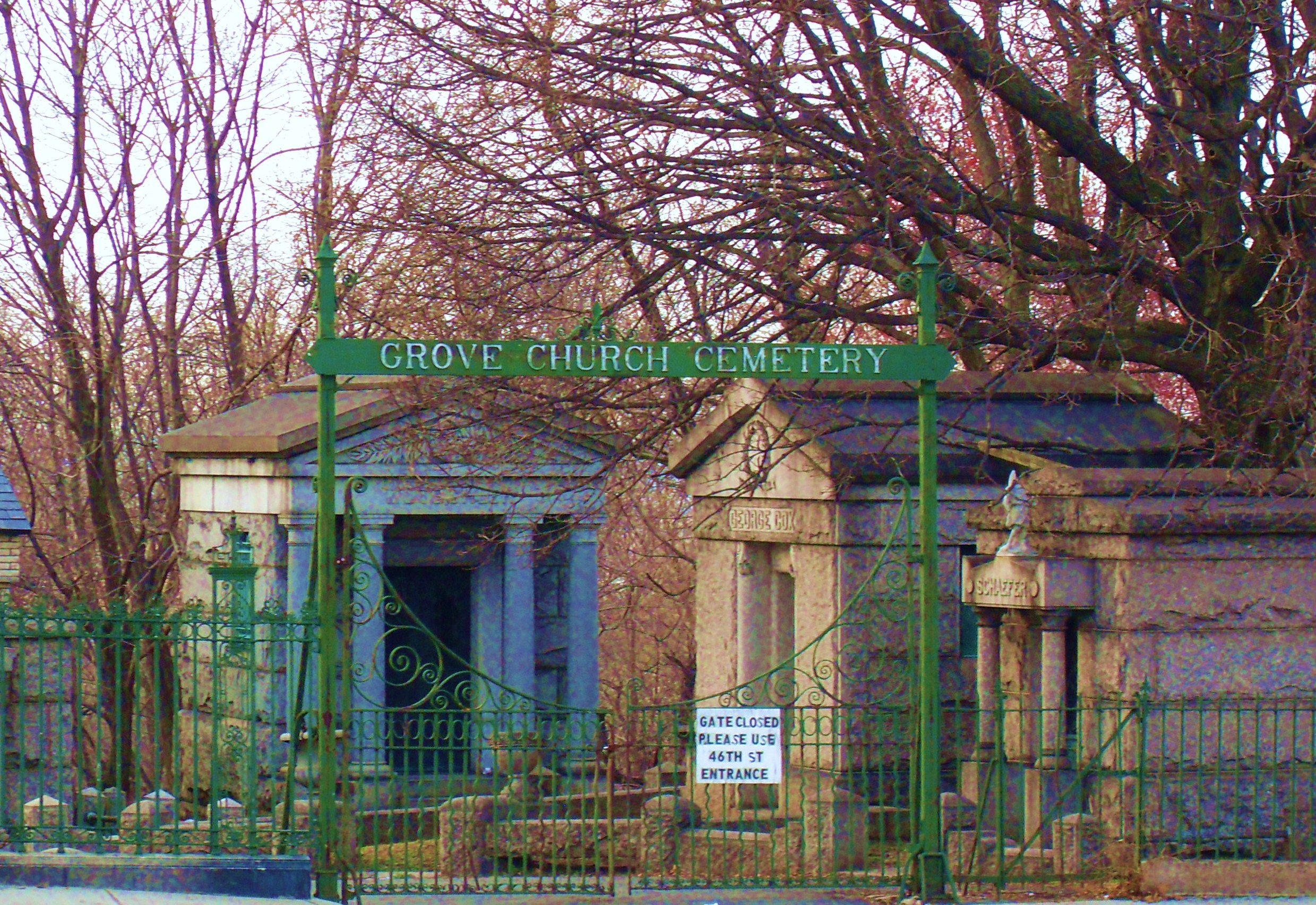
- Gate entrance along Kennedy Boulevard
- Interactive map of Grove Church Cemetery

Details
- Established: 1847
- Location: North Bergen, New Jersey
- Country: United States
- Coordinates: 40.7831566°N 74.0259734°W
- Type: Nonsectarian
- Owned by: Reformed Grove Church
- Size: 8 acres (3.2 ha)
- Website: www.grovereformedchurch.org
- Find a Grave: Grove Church Cemetery

The Grove Church Cemetery is a nonsectarian cemetery, located on the western slope of the Hudson Palisades, along with several other cemeteries in a string of green open space, in Hudson County, New Jersey, United States. The Grove Church, who owns the cemetery, is one of the oldest religious bodies in the area, and it has had an operating cemetery since 1847. Throughout its history, prominent families have been buried there, as well as American Civil war veterans. There have also been reports of vandalism and misuse of the property since the 19th century, and in 2007 some of the cemetery grounds were occupied by the homeless.

== Location ==
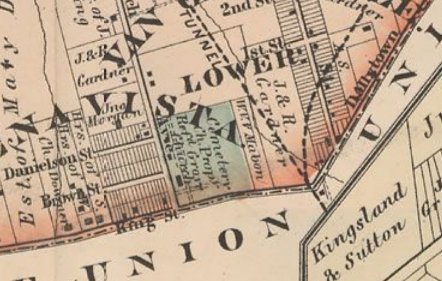
Map of cemetery in 1873.

Grove Church Cemetery is located at 1132 46th Street in North Bergen, New Jersey. The cemetery also fronts Kennedy Boulevard which in the 19th century was known as Dallytown Road, or Bergenwood Road. Overlooking into the Secaucus, it starts at the top and extends onto the middle of the western face of the Hudson Palisades. Grove Church Cemetery is one of several burial sites on the western slope, along with Machpelah Cemetery, Hoboken Cemetery and Weehawken Cemetery, which is only a few blocks away from Grove Church along with Palisades Cemetery. These grounds constitute a string of green open spaces in North Hudson County. The gated entrance is across the street, east of the Bergenline Avenue station of the Hudson Bergen Light Rail in Union City, New Jersey.

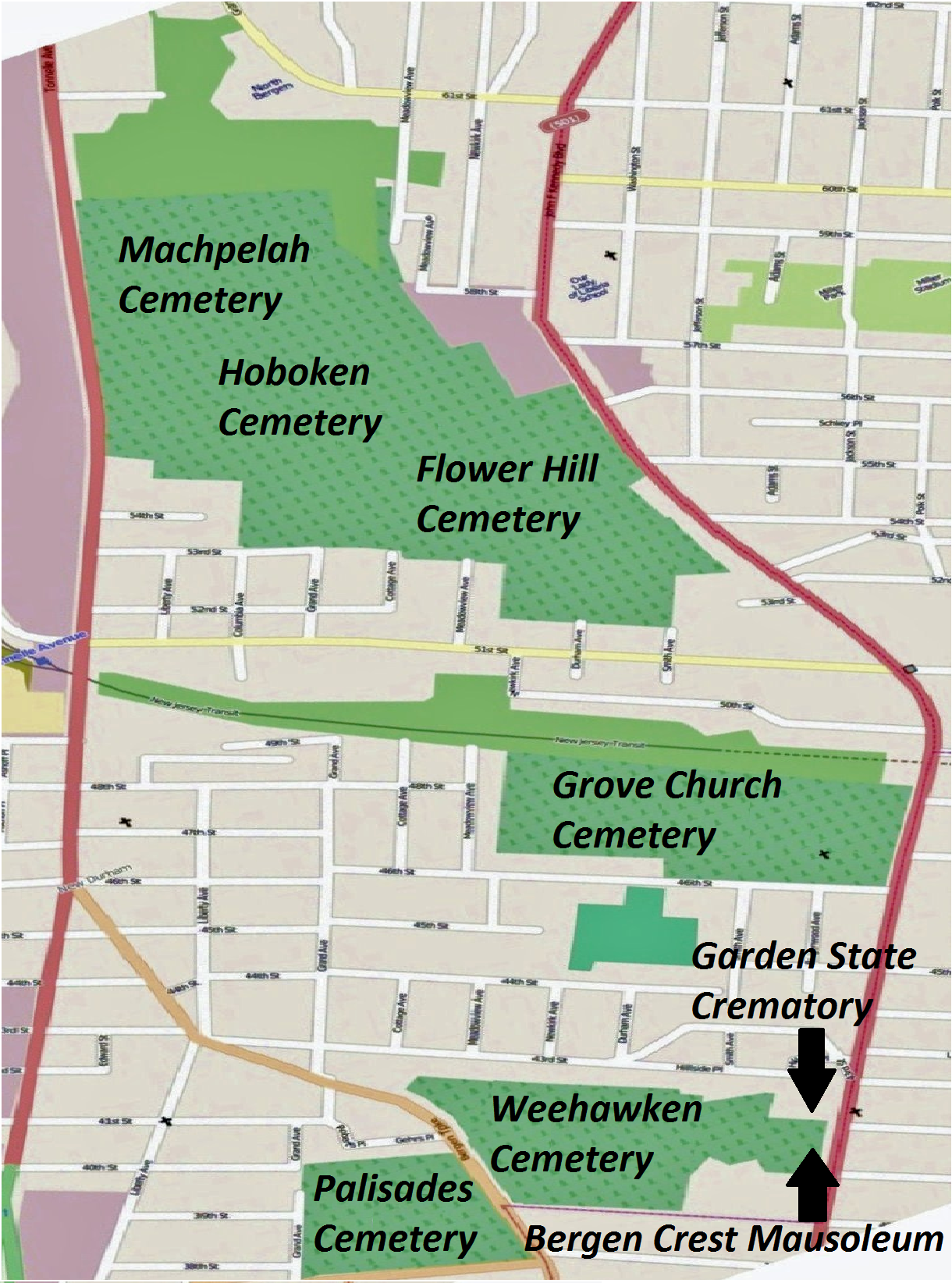
Grove Church Cemetery is located at the western slope of the Palisades.

== History ==
Located in then both Union Hill and New Durham, the Reformed Church at New Durham which was also known as the "Grove Church", was for many years the only Dutch Reformed church in the area. It has been operational since April 12, 1843, and was one of the first religious bodies established in the wilds of North Hudson, the Bergen Woods. The first pastor was Reverend Philip Duryee who acted until 1844, and was succeeded by William Taylor, a Rutgers graduate who later acted as pastor for a nearby Jersey City congregation. Taylor was succeeded by William Mabon in 1846. The land at the cemetery has been used for burial purposes since 1847, which has made it one of the oldest burial grounds in Hudson County. Typical grave depths are approximately five feet, and the grounds bare dry soils of yellowish earth, loose drift gravel, and pockets of sand, as well as occurrences of trap rock. Before the turn of the 20th century, there were two vaults on the premises, one made of brick and the other of stone; there are many more now. Overall, the grounds at Grove Church Cemetery are roughly 8 acres (3.2 ha). Because of the natural descent of the cemeteries location on the western side of the Palisades, ground water flows into the surrounding marshes in Secaucus, and contamination of wells, springs, and water-courses in the surrounding area is very low. Other than having a relatively large congregation, many of the church members were of wealth, and owned plots and vaults in the cemetery.

In the year 1890, Edwin B. Young, a descendant of United Empire Royalists and a colonel in the King's Royal, was made superintendent of the grounds. A particular wealthy family, the Gardners, had large granite vaults built very visibly to pedestrians along then Bergenwood Road. It was reported by the New York Sun that grave robbers had broken into various vaults at Grove Church. The Gardner vault had been found opened, which required the vandal to smash locks as well as break the iron railing, which was believed to be achieved by the use of hammers and chisels stolen from on adjoined marble yard. Robert Gardner's metallic coffin was found opened, removed from the shelf upon which it sat. The investigation, led by Superintendent Young, left those involved unsure of why the perpetrators would have broken in, and with no apparent objective or reason, they concluded that it may have been done simply to desecrate the resting place of the dead. Young held that position of superintendent until 1899, for the pursuit of real estate.

It is owned and maintained by the Reformed Grove Church, and is still active and well kept, and the offices are located on the cemetery grounds. There are 31 American Civil War veteran graves at Grove Church Cemetery.

== Use by the homeless ==
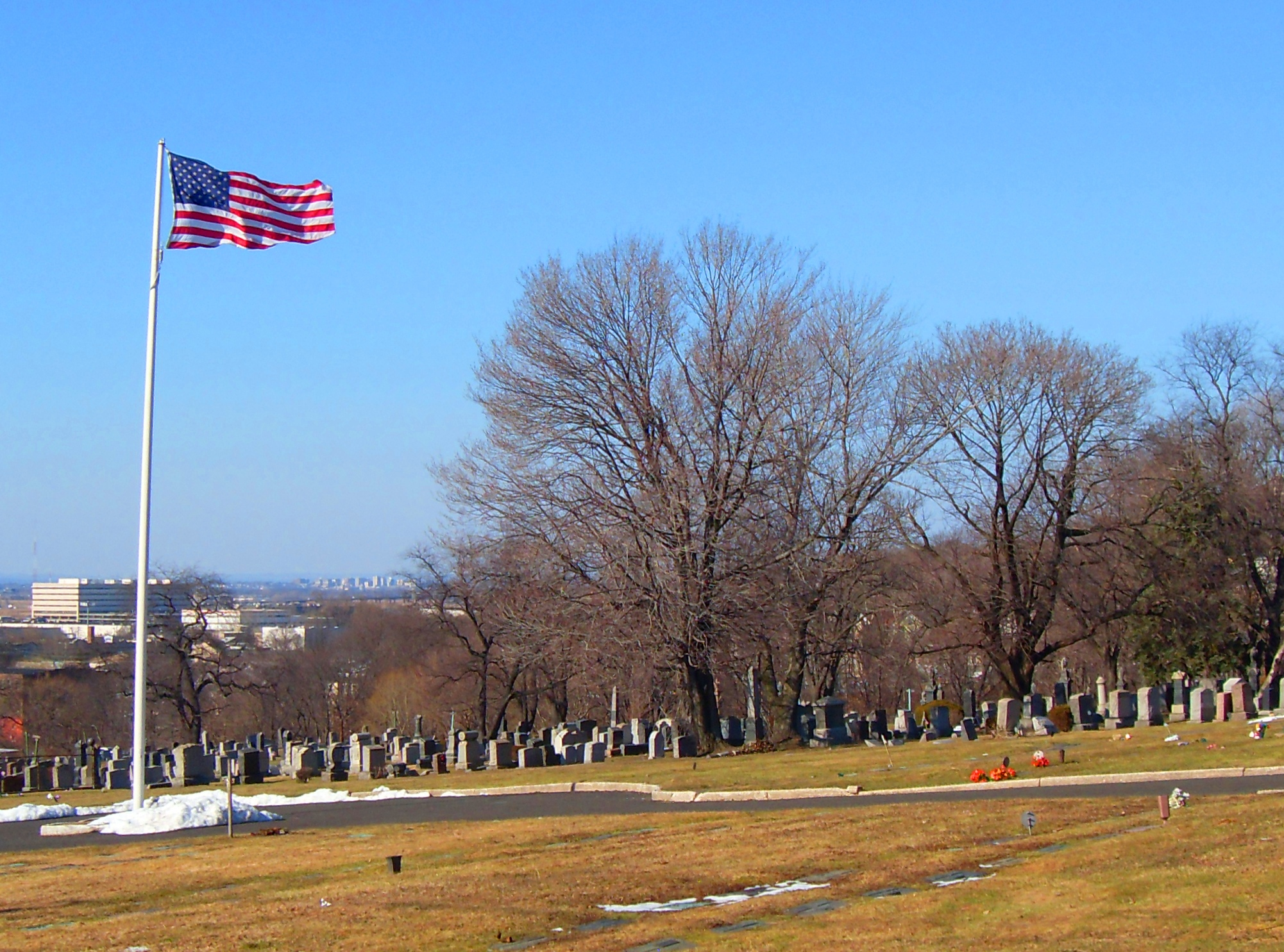
Cemetery along southern perimeter.

Called "a cemetery for the living", it was reported in 2007 that between 30 and 135 homeless people were squatting in the Grove Church Cemetery. An investigation had been brought on by a sexual assault of a woman, who was near the Bergenline Avenue Station of the Hudson Bergen Light Rail, and by knife-point was brought into the cemetery and assaulted. Upon searching the grounds, police found remnants of living activity, namely mattresses, pillows, and blankets, as well as garbage strewn across the lawn. Also, small shacks had been built along the perimeter. To the dismay of neighbors, who had complained about the noise and feeling unsafe, there was not much that the police could do to remove the people off of the premises; there is no law against loitering in public places. One victim, however, claimed that there were bronze urns stolen from his relative's tomb. In addition, the Reformed Grove Church had been supporting the homeless by providing them with meals, as it is within their rights and devotion to charity that they will not turn away anyone seeking help.

The homeless, who were by majority South and Central American males, said that they came into the area from their respective countries in promise of work. A particular individual who was interviewed said that the work he was told about had only been short term and, along with many of the others, had nowhere else to go. Most who had been approached about relocation into nearby homeless shelters express their hesitation to leave the Grove Church Cemetery grounds, fearful that they would lose the freedom they had on the public property. Measures were taken to remove and clean up the cemetery, and it is believed that while some may have entered into shelters, others likely still reside in the general area, while some had moved into the wooded eastern side of the Palisades hills in Union City, where many shacks can be seen supporting the homeless.

== Notable burials ==
- James Buttersworth (1817–1894), English painter who specialized in maritime art
- William Hexamer (1825–1870), American Civil War major
- Horace Grant Underwood (1859–1916), transferred to Yanghwajin Foreigners' Cemetery

== See also ==
- List of cemeteries in Hudson County, New Jersey
- List of cemeteries in New Jersey

== Sources ==
- Brooklyn Fairchild Sons (2010). "Grove Church Cemetery". Fairchild Cemetery Manual a Reliable Guide to the Cemeteries of Greater New York and Vicinity. General Books LLC. p. 202. ISBN 978-1-152-90435-4.
- Grassby, Richard B. (1994). Ship, sea & sky: the marine art of James Edward Buttersworth. Rizzoli. pp. 128. ISBN 0-8478-1805-5.
- Hagstrom Map (2008). Hudson County New Jersey Street Map. Hagstrom Map Company, Inc. ISBN 978-0-88097-763-0.
- Harvey, Cornelius Burnham (1900). Genealogical history of Hudson and Bergen counties, New Jersey. New Jersey Genealogical Publishing Co. pp. 617. ISBN 0-7884-0424-5.
- Inskeep, Carolee (1998). "New York City Metropolitan Area Cemeteries". The graveyard shift: a family historian's guide to New York City cemeteries. Ancestry Publishing. p. 296. ISBN 0-916489-89-2.
- Leonard, J. H. (1901). The Leonard Manual of the Cemeteries of New York and Vicinity. BiblioBazaar, LLC. p. 148. ISBN 1-115-04459-1.
- National Board of Health (1879). "Cemeteries and Burials". Annual report of the National Board of Health, 1879–1885. Government Printing Office. p. 477.
- State Dept. of Health, New Jersey. Board of Health (1898). "Annual report". New Jersey. Board of Health: 392. OCLC 1759842.
- United States Cremation Company; New York Cremation Society; Manhattan Cremation; President Society (1894). "The Urn". 3. Louis Lange: 12. OCLC 10983514.
- Wilson, James Grant; Fiske, John (1889). "Appleton's cyclopædia of American biography". D. Appleton and company. OCLC 5205626.
- Winfield, Charles Hardenburg (1874). "History of the county of Hudson, New Jersey: from its earliest settlement to the present time". Kennard & Hay Stationery M'fg and Print. Co: 568. OCLC 426912.
