= Machpelah Cemetery (North Bergen, New Jersey) =

Cemetery in New Jersey, US

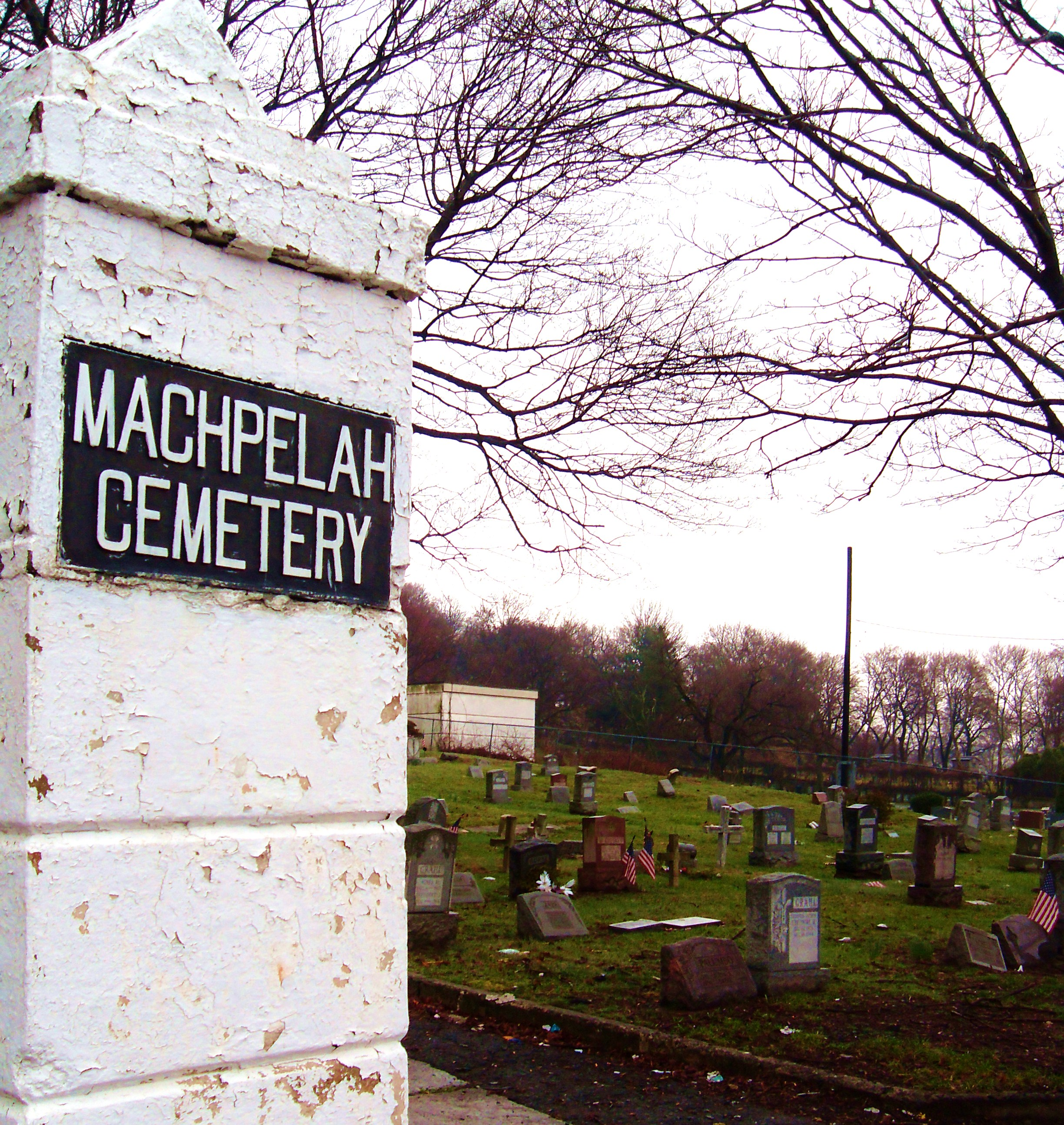
- Near the front entrance along Tonnelle Avenue
- Interactive map of Machpelah Cemetery

Details
- Established: 1850
- Location: North Bergen, New Jersey
- Country: United States
- Coordinates: 40.7881566°N 74.0251401°W
- Size: 10 acres (40,000 m^{2})
- Website: Hudson Crematory and Cemetery
- Find a Grave: Machpelah Cemetery

The Machpelah Cemetery, also spelled as "Macpelah Cemetery", or "Macphelah Cemetery", is a cemetery in Hudson County, New Jersey.

== Location ==
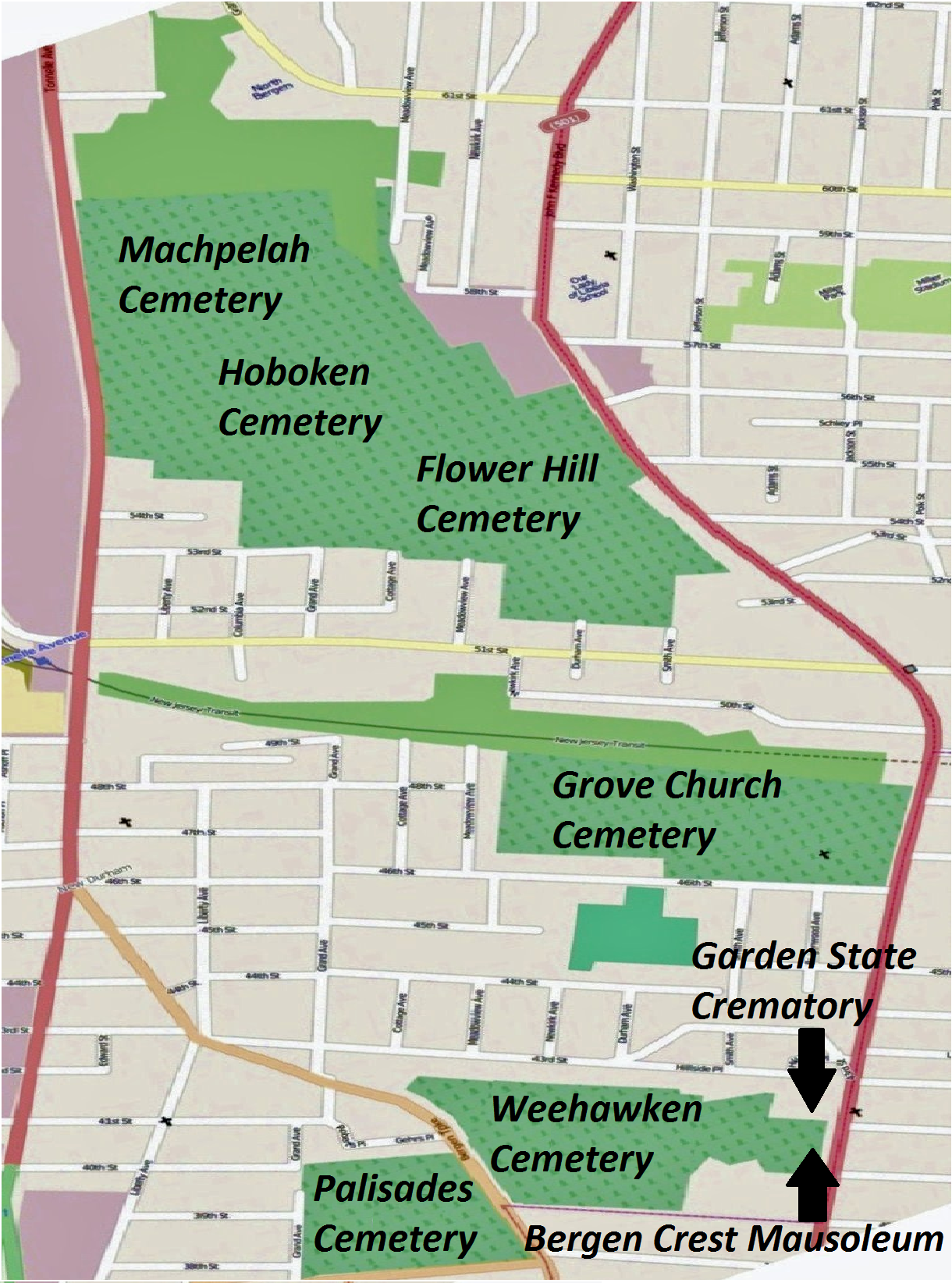
Machpelah is the northernmost of cemeteries along the western slope of the Palisades in northern Hudson County.

Machpelah Cemetery is located at 5810 Tonnelle Avenue, in North Bergen, New Jersey. It is one of several burial sites along the western slope of the Hudson Palisades, which rise to the east 220 to 260 feet (67 to 79 m) above sea-level, including the adjacent Hoboken Cemetery, and nearby Grove Church Cemetery, Weehawken Cemetery, and Flower Hill Cemetery, which together constitute a string of green open spaces in North Hudson County. The entrance is just north of the Tonnelle Avenue terminus of the Hudson Bergen Light Rail.

== History ==
=== Name ===
Machpelah is a name given to numerous cemeteries in the United States. The Cave of the Patriarchs or the Cave of Machpelah (Hebrew: מערת המכפלה, Me'arat HaMachpela, Trans. "Doubled Cave") is a cave-within-a-cave located in Hebron that Biblical tradition ascribes the status of the burial tomb for Abraham, Isaac, Jacob, and their wives.

=== Before the cemetery ===
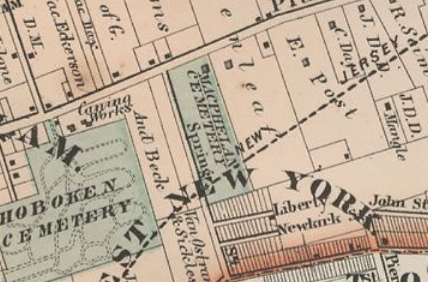
1873 map showing Macpelah Cemetery

Machpelah is contained within Lot No. 18 in then Maisland, which contained a celebrated and exotic garden, locally called the "Frenchman's Garden", since the well-known botanist André Michaux was commissioned by the King of France, Louis XVI in 1786 as a botanist with the ability to import any plant, tree or vegetable from France that was desired by the United States. It also featured a variety of plants collected from the United States, as well as plants from all over the world. It was enclosed in a stone wall, roughly 30 acres (120,000 m^{2}) and kept by the gardener Pierre-Paul Saunier. The Lombardy poplar was originally stocked in the garden, and, introduced into commerce, eventually spread throughout the United States.

=== Use as a burial site ===
Located in the Bergenwood section of then New Durham, land at Machpelah Cemetery was first used for burial purposes in 1850. The cemetery was officially opened in 1853, by the Third Reformed Presbyterian Church Society of New York, and thus, was for many years strictly Protestant Cemetery. This is controversial and disputed by many. Other sources list it strictly as a Jewish burial site and claim the misinformation on Protestant ownership was due to the widespread anti semitism and attempt by the Protestant Church in New York to convert all Jews to Christianity. The Protestant missionary movement in the 1800s to convert "was reported regularly in The New York Times newspaper. In the Twenty Seventh edition of Appleton's Dictionary dated 1905, listed in alphabetical order just above the description of Madison Square Garden, it discusses Machpelah Cemetery being strictly a Jewish Cemetery. It makes no mention of a Protestant cemetery being in use on the same grounds or being shared. Rather Appleton's Dictionary explains it is a Jewish Cemetery in addition to a 2nd Jewish Cemetery of the same name in Queens New York. Overall, the grounds at Machpelah cemetery are approximately 10 acres (40,000 m^{2}). Because of the steep grade of the grounds and the eventual descent into the surrounding marshes in Secaucus, contamination of wells, springs, and water-courses in the surrounding area is very low.

A report from 1879 states that 2,500 graves lie in the cemetery, where the price of a grave annually was about $100, and in the next century it was reported to have over 18,000 bodies in it.

In 1900, many who died in the massive fire on the Hoboken piers the SS Saale, and SS Bremen on the North River (Hudson River) were interred at the cemetery and the adjacent Flower Hill in gravesites purchased by the shipping company.

In 2022, Hudson County and volunteers embarked on program to restore gravestones of over 300 veterans buried at the cemetery.

== See also ==
- Hudson County Cemeteries
- Fairview Cemetery

== Sources ==
- "The American missionary". Congregational Home Missionary Society. 35. American Missionary Association: 232. 1881. ISSN 1079-9044. OCLC 1480434.
- Appleton, D. (1902). "Appleton's dictionary of New York and vicinity". D. Appleton & Co. V: 353. OCLC 604901070.
- Hudson County New Jersey Street Map. Hagstrom Map Company, Inc. 2008. ISBN 978-0880977630.
- Inskeep, Carolee (1998). "New York City Metropolitan Area Cemeteries". The graveyard shift: a family historian's guide to New York City cemeteries. Ancestry Publishing. p. 296. ISBN 0916489892.
- Leonard, J. H. (1901). The Leonard Manual of the Cemeteries of New York and Vicinity. BiblioBazaar, LLC. p. 148. ISBN 1115044591.
- National Board of Health (1879). "Cemeteries and Burials". Annual report of the National Board of Health, 1879–1885. Government Printing Office. p. 477.
- State Dept. of Health, New Jersey. Board of Health (1898). "Annual report". New Jersey. Board of Health: 392. OCLC 1759842.
- Garden Journal. 7–8. New York Botanical Garden. 1957. ISSN 0016-4585. OCLC 1570422.
- Rieser, Robert (1915). "Hudson County to-day: Hudson County, New Jersey; its history, people, trades, commerce, institutions and industries". Hudson Dispatch: 162. OCLC 35906879.
- Winfield, Charles Hardenburg (1874). "History of the county of Hudson, New Jersey: from its earliest settlement to the present time". Kennard & Hay Stationery M'fg and Print. Co: 568. OCLC 426912.
