= Schützenverein =

Type of local voluntary association in German-speaking countries

A Schützenverein (German for "marksmen's club") is a local voluntary association found in German-speaking countries revolving around shooting as a sport, often target shooting to Olympic rules or with historic weapons. Although originating as a town militia, a Schützenverein has no military aspects and in many cases often has a more social than sporting purpose.

== Origins ==
These associations originated in late medieval autonomous towns as a form of citizens' militia principally to defend the town.

== Germany ==
Germany has over 15,000 Schützenvereine, with most of them affiliated to the "Deutscher Schützenbund" (German Marksmen's Federation, DSB) umbrella organization. The DSB was founded in 1861 in Gotha and revived in 1951 in Frankfurt am Main following World War II. The DSB's 1,500,000 members makes it the third largest sports organisation in Germany.

Other organisations for sport shooting in Germany include the Bund Deutscher Sportschützen, "Bund der Militär- und Polizeischützen" and the "Deutsche Schießsport Union". These focus more on the sport and offer a wider variety of shooting styles and competition types than the DSB, particularly in the field of large-bore firearms.

Each Schützenverein organizes shooting events, including at the very least an annual Schützenfest. Weapons used may include air rifles, air pistols, small bore weapons and crossbows.

== Rest of Europe ==
The concept of the Schützenverein is not unique to Germany. Many other European countries have similar traditions, such as France, Belgium, the Netherlands, Austria, Italy and Poland. In these countries, the organisations are also known as Shooting Guilds.

== United States ==
Schuetzenvereins were founded in the United States by German-Americans and acted as a social club for their communities. Each club had a range for target shooting and often also a bar. Larger clubs could have extensive facilities such as an inn, dance hall, music pavilion, zoo, bowling alley, roller coaster, refreshment stands, athletic field, picnic grounds, and other amusements. It was common for tens of thousands of people to attend a major event.

The popularity of these facilities began to decline in the United States around 1917, when anti-German sentiment from World War I restricted the activities of German-Americans and led to the prohibition of the public speaking of the German language in the United States. Many businesses and organizations translated their German names or dissolved. The American Schützenvereine were dealt another serious blow in 1919 when the "Prohibition Act" outlawed the manufacture and sale of alcoholic beverages, the consumption of which was casually mixed with shooting activities.

Schuetzen Park in North Bergen, New Jersey and Schuetzen Park in Davenport, Iowa recall the tradition. The former Deutsch-Amerikanische Schützen Gesellschaft building stands at 12 St. Mark's Place in New York City's East Village, and has been a designated landmark since 2001.

== Australia ==
German settlers in Australia also formed Schützenvereine, notably in South Australia where Australian German associations run the Schützenfest in Adelaide.

== Sources ==
- Immaterielles Kulturerbe und Regionale Identität - Schützenwesen in Nordwestdeutschland (in German). transcript Verlag. 2023. ISBN 978-3-8394-6126-6.
