= Blue Chapel =

Former Dominican monastery in New Jersey, USA

Convent of the Dominican Sisters of the Perpetual Rosary
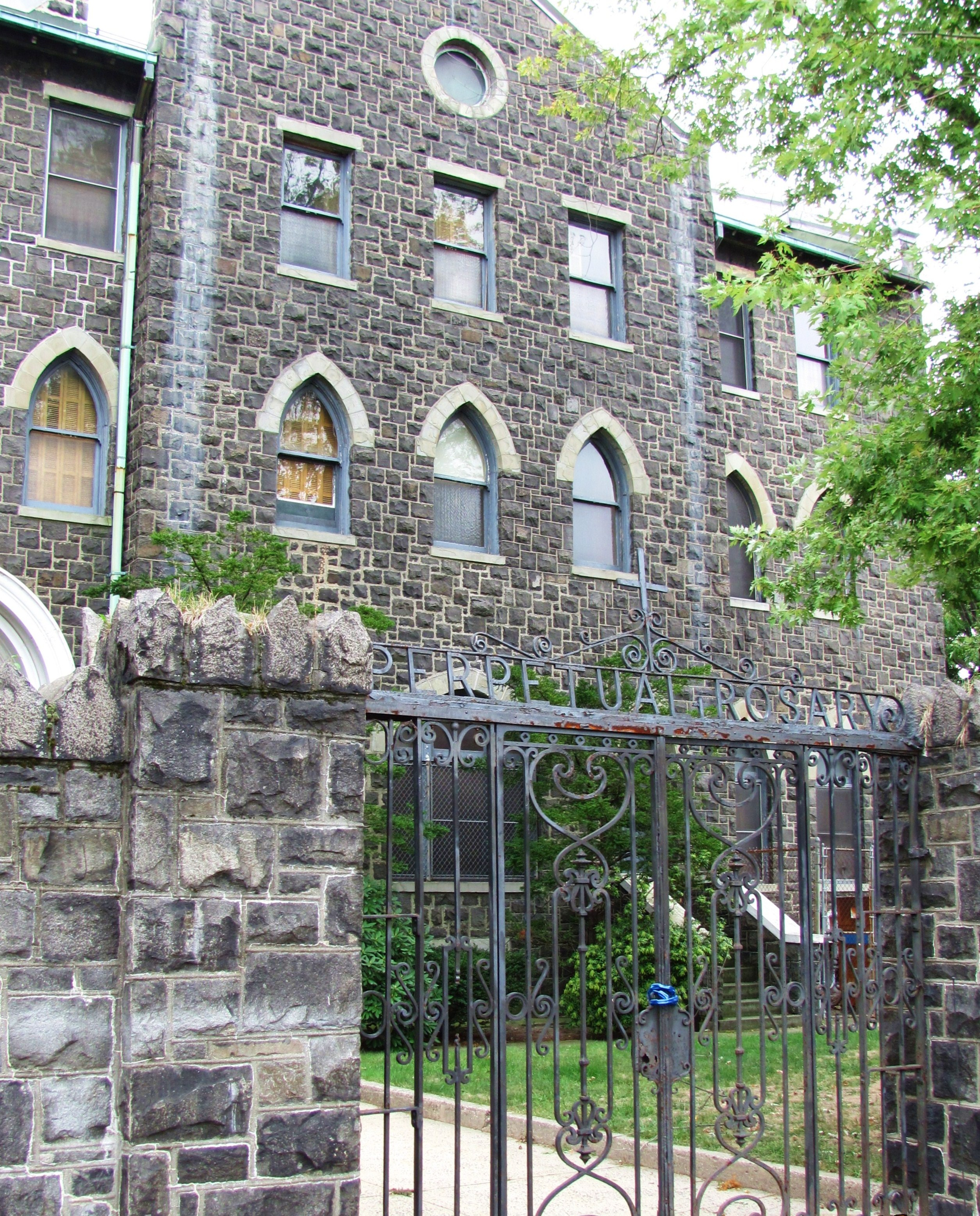
- Interactive map of Convent of the Dominican Sisters of the Perpetual Rosary

Details
- Established: 1912
- Location: 605 14th Street; Union City, New Jersey; 07087
- Country: United States
- Coordinates: 40.76129°N 74.03790°W
- Type: Dominican Order
- Size: 1.4 acres (5,700 m^{2})
- No. of graves: 65

The Monastery of the Dominican Sisters of the Perpetual Rosary, known as the Blue Chapel, is a former monastery in Union City, Hudson County, New Jersey, in the United States. It takes its name from the blue tinted windows that were part of the original chapel. Since being abandoned in 2008, the structures and grounds of the complex, which include a cemetery, face an uncertain future.

== History ==
In 1891, Father Damien-Marie Saintourens of the Order of Preachers came from France and was joined by nuns in what was then West Hoboken, New Jersey where they established the American branch of Dominican Nuns of the Perpetual Rosary. Between 1912 and 1914 the Gothic Revival complex was built as the first monastery in the United States dedicated to the recitation of the Perpetual Rosary. The Passionist fathers of St. Michael's Monastery and Church acted served as chaplains at the chapel's services. Twenty-one other centers were later established across the country.

Adornments included art work created by former resident Sister Mary of the Compassion. and stained glass windows originally thought to have been imported from Germany, but discovered in 2012 to have been created in Buffalo, New York by stained glass artist Leo P. Frohe (1851 - 1919) of Buffalo Glass Works in the spirit of the historic Munich School style. The convent housed a number of important relics, including those of the True Cross and fragments of a bone of Saint Dominic.

The landscaped grounds encompass 1.4 acres (5,700 m^{2}) and are enclosed by a high stone wall creating an oasis in the densely populated urban neighborhood which surrounds it. There are approximately 65 graves of nuns located in the cemetery on the property. The U-shaped bluestone building that included the chapel, dormitories, kitchen, and offices was well-maintained for many years, but as finances and residents diminished it began to fall into disrepair, and was vacated in 2009. Water damage and lack of heat have contributed to further deterioration.

Plans by the order to renovate the building to apartments were met with community opposition and were withdrawn, leaving the status of the complex uncertain. The convent is not listed on the New Jersey Register of Historic Places or the National Register of Historic Places. Preservation New Jersey, a historical preservation organization, considers the landmark to be one of the state's most endangered historic sites. The city has expressed interest in preserving the site, and sought to draw attention to this need by installing a historic site marker there on May 28, 2011. Protective stipulations were written into the city's zoning plan passed in early 2012. Around the same time, local historian Tony Squire made the discovery that the stained glass windows, which are still in excellent condition for their age, were not made in Germany, but by artist Leo P. Frohe. Because obtaining national landmark status for the Chapel would require establishing its architectural or historical importance as "the work of a master" or the studio of a significant artist, it is speculated that Squire's research may reveal Frohe as such a master. Frohe enthusiast believes that Frohe indeed qualifies, as the Buffalo Stained Glass Works has a history that traces back to the beginning of stained glass in the United States, and Frohe himself was awarded a silver medal in the Exposition Universelle of 1889 in France for his work, beating hundreds of fellow American competitors.

== See also ==
- List of cemeteries in Hudson County, New Jersey
- Monastery and Church of Saint Michael the Archangel
- List of Registered Historic Places in Hudson County, New Jersey
- Historic districts in Hudson County, New Jersey
