= Abel I. Smith Burial Ground =

Cemetery in Secaucus, New Jersey, US

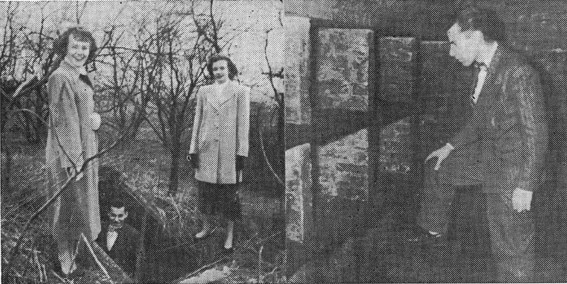
- "Photo taken in the Abel I. Smith Cemetery shows Melvin McClure, Anita Koch, Beatrice Irving at the underground vault. It has been proposed to make a park of the site." – Home News Photo
- Interactive map of Abel I. Smith Burial Ground

Details
- Established: 1755
- Location: Secaucus, New Jersey
- Country: United States
- Coordinates: 40.777984°N 74.062622°W
- Type: Family Burial Ground
- No. of graves: ~64
- Find a Grave: Abel I. Smith Burial Ground

The Abel I. Smith Burial Ground (also spelled Able I. Smith Burial Ground) was a family burial plot in Hudson County, New Jersey, United States.

== Location ==
The land owned by Abel Smith stretched far. In a 1908 edition of The New York Times, the farm was said to have been bisected by Secaucus Road, and "between the Paterson Plank Road on the north, the Penn Horn Creek on the East, the lands of S. Jacobs on the south, and the old Secaucus racetrack to the west."

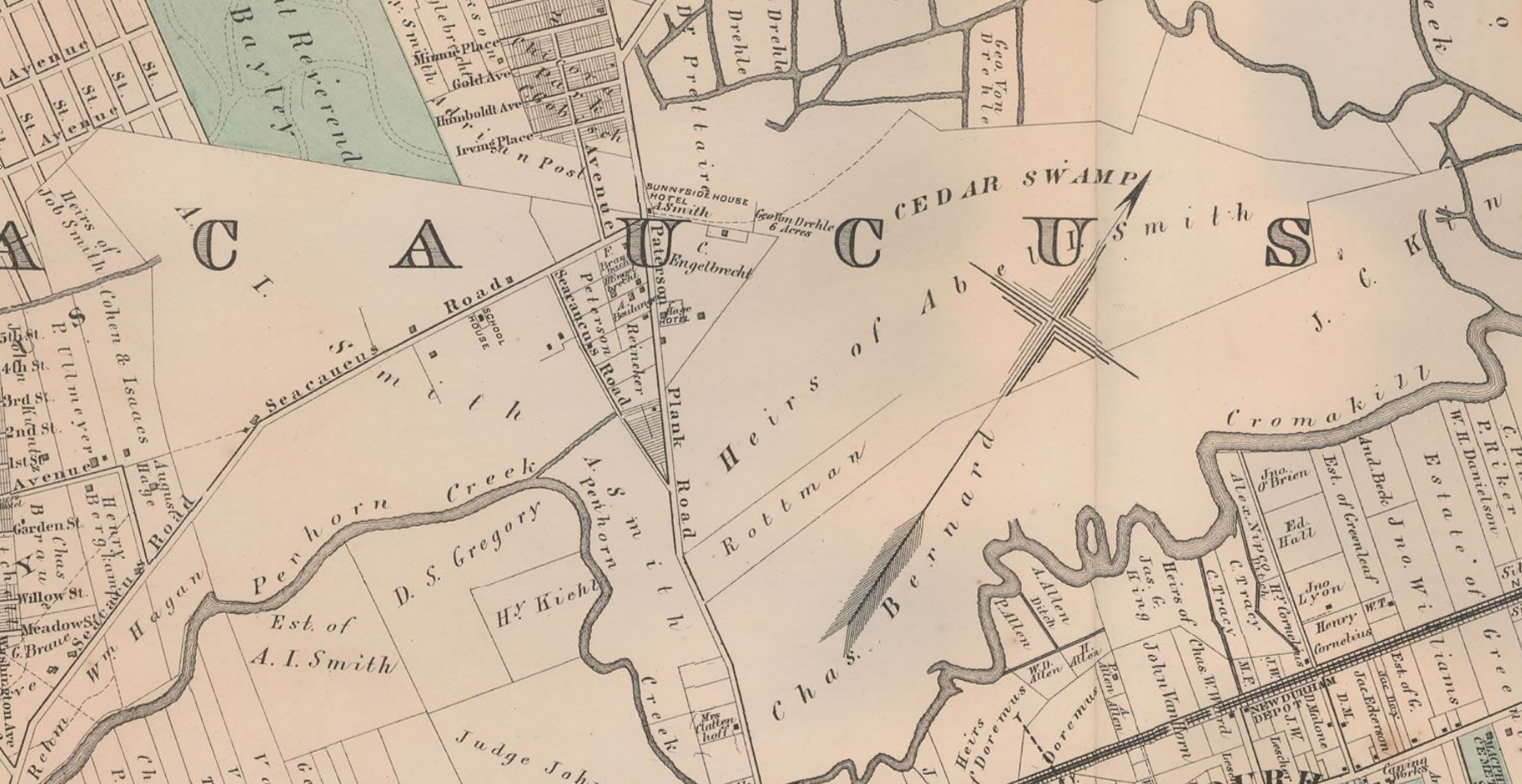
1873 map showing Abel I. Smith properties.

The burial ground lay in a grove at one of the highest spots in Secaucus, obscured by high grass and trees, overlooking the expanse of the meadows and into the Hackensack River. It was bordered on the west side by County Road and the grounds of a Mental Disease Hospital that is no longer in existence, currently located near the intersection of Secaucus Road and County Road. The Abel I. Smith Burial Ground faces the Hudson Palisades on the west and the marshes of Secaucus on the east.

Along with the Van Buskirk Family Burial Ground, the Sandford Family Burial Ground and others, the Abel I. Smith Burial Ground is one of a few recognized family burial grounds in Hudson County.

== History ==
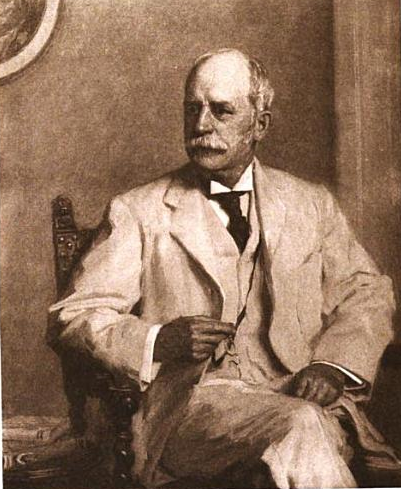
Abel I. Smith, namesake of the original owner and last related property owner of the Smith farm, d. 1918.

In 1733, Abel Smith and his wife Deborah moved from Great Neck to Secaucus, where he bought a large tract of land and constructed a large mansion. The first burial on the grounds was that of Abel Smith himself, who died in 1755.

The Smith family farm was approximately 206 acres (830,000 m^{2}), consisting of meadowland and toward the upland of western Hudson Palisades. The Smith family owned the plot from the 18th century until the early 20th century. The property was passed down through the generations, and as a result, many of the burials were of the Smith family themselves. However, a few other families were buried there over the course of its use as a cemetery, namely the Post and Earle families.

In the year 1875, "Jack" Jackson, who was described as the last slave in New Jersey, died at the age of 87 on the Smith family farm. In 1820, Smith manumitted his slaves, but Jack refused the freedom he was offered and remained on the family estate until his death. Following the will of the late Abel Smith, he was interred in the family burial ground.

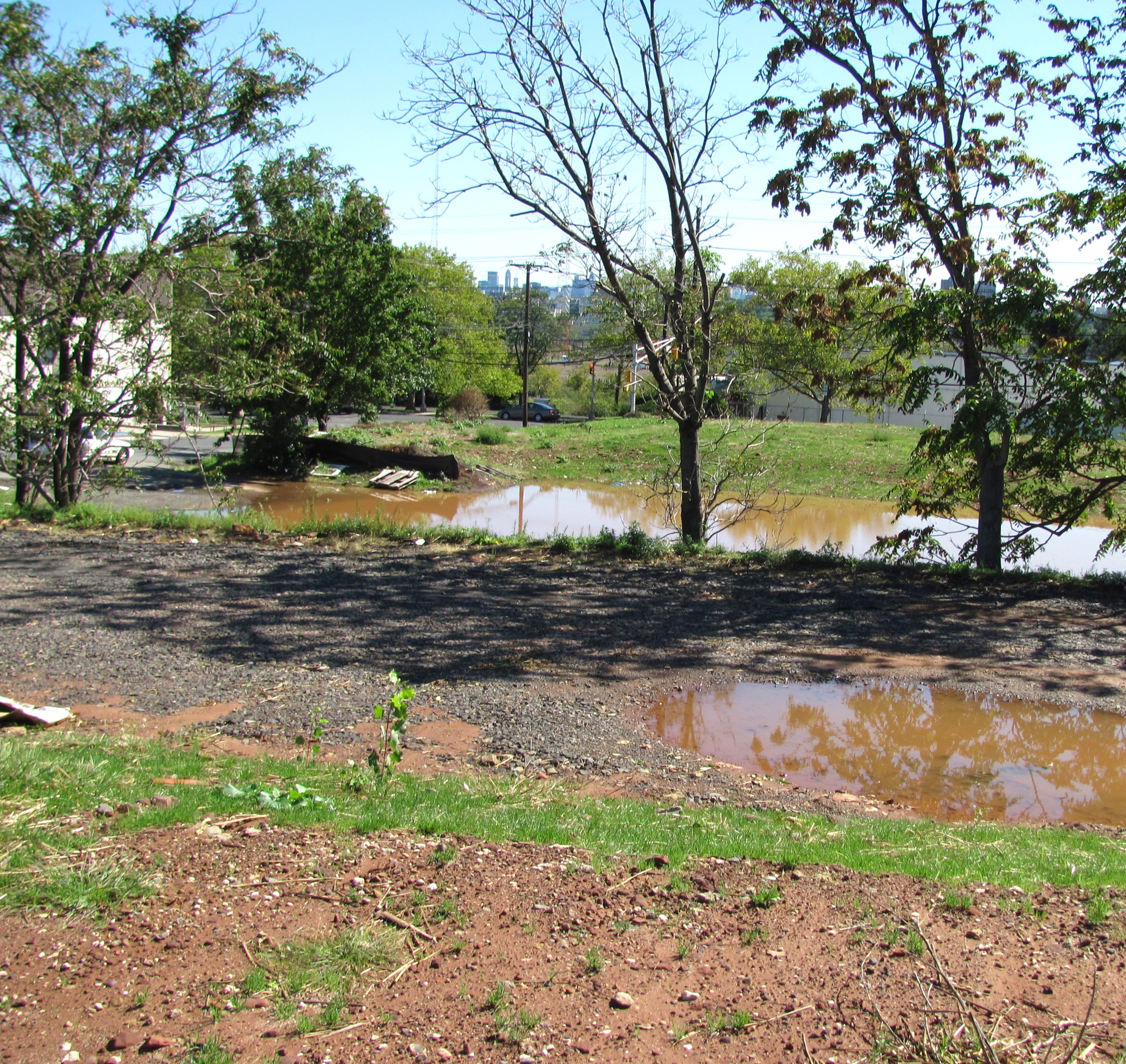
Eastward view from the Abel I. Smith Burial Ground, where the Empire State Building can be seen in the distance.

Overall, the Abel I. Smith Burial Ground contained roughly 64 gravesites. The site held several vaults; the crypt had 24 shelves, with 12 coffins reserved for adults, and 12 for children. These were reserved for the Smith family. In 1950, it was reported that all the vaults had been broken into and all the bodies had been removed, likely by grave robbers.

=== Sale ===
On December 1, 1908, the deed to the Smith land was turned over to B.M. Shanley's Sons' Company of Newark and the H.S. Korbaugh Company of West Virginia for the sum of $255,000. Although the site is no longer used as a cemetery, the remains of those buried were never removed, giving the usage of the land as a cemetery under the Smiths' ownership a span of roughly 153 years, and it is presumed that the bodies are still buried there.

After the sale to the respective companies, a proposal was aired to turn the grounds into a park. In 1948, a Secaucus librarian named Marion Dudley also supported the preservation of the site as a park due to its old age and its high position, which would provide a good view over Secaucus. However, these proposals apparently failed.

Attempts to transcribe the gravestones have been undertaken, and several lists exist. It is believed that the original burial site was built over by a UPS company warehouse, and that the bodies still lie in their plots.

== See also ==
- List of cemeteries in Hudson County, New Jersey

== Sources ==
- Hagstrom Map (2008). Hudson County New Jersey Street Map. Hagstrom Map Company, Inc. ISBN 978-0-88097-763-0.
- Proceedings of the New Jersey Historical Society. 7: 355. 1922. ISSN 0096-8935. OCLC 2563735.
- The New York Genealogical and Biographical Record. 53. New York Genealogical and Biographical Society. 1922. ISSN 0028-7237. OCLC 12658402.
- New York Genealogical and Biographical Society Records. 78. New York Genealogical and Biographical Society. July 1947. OCLC 12658402.
- Reed, Gertrude Scholl; Henkel, Robert Edward (1950). "History of Secaucus, New Jersey in commemoration of the fiftieth anniversary of its independence". Secaucus Home News: 105. OCLC 8102160.
- Stratford, Dorothy A.; Riemer, Janet (October 1988). "Inventory of GSNJ Files of New Jersey Cemeteries" (PDF). The Genealogical Society of New Jersey (Hudson County): 1. Archived from the original (PDF) on 2 November 2012.
