= Mapsco =

- Founded: 1989
- Headquarters: Addison, Texas, United States

Mapsco was a privately held publisher of maps and atlases, and was based in Addison, Texas. Universal Map Group, LLC, an affiliate of Kappa Media Group, Inc. acquired the assets of Mapsco, Inc. from Dallas-based Rupe Investment Corp. in March 2010. Rupe Investment Corp. had owned Mapsco, Inc. since 1989. The Kappa Map Group suddenly ceased operations in early 2022 when the group's Managing Director departed for another position and no so-called "white knight" was found to rescue the mapping group. Decades of cartographic work was abandoned when the Map Group closed down.

== History ==
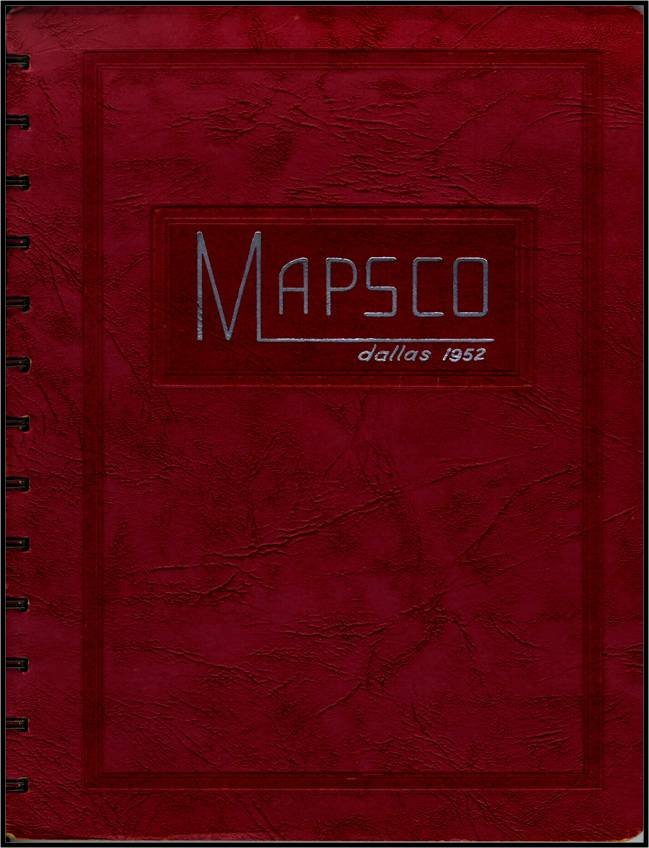
The cover of the first Dallas Mapsco dated 1952

Mapsco was started by Milton Boyd Keith, owner of several Dallas, Texas, florist shops. Impetus for the first Dallas Mapsco began in 1948 when Keith's drivers kept getting lost, and he decided to make a street atlas booklet for them. Keith spent four years appealing to local government entities to obtain current mapping, but was never successful. Finally, in 1951, Keith approached the Dallas City Building Inspection Division, to obtain mapping data. Their maps were the most accurate produced at that time, but had no index. (The building inspectors at that time just knew where everything was by memory.) Keith obtained the BID maps from the city and began to work in the back of the flower shop at 3323 Oak Lawn Avenue, producing an indexed street map. His shop manager, Lily Kendrick, was instrumental in the laborious process of paging and indexing the city of Dallas into a booklet.

The first Mapsco Product, the Dallas Street Guide, was printed in 1952, with 3,000 copies produced. The original book covered Dallas and the Park Cities, with insets for Carrollton and Garland, Texas. The book was originally not intended for public sale, and was only to be used by Keith's large fleet of flower delivery drivers. Soon, however, other flower shops began asking Keith and his employees for copies of the books to aid them in their deliveries as well.

From 1953 to 1955, the Dallas Mapsco was made with a glued back in order to save costs on production. These first few years also saw the production of Mapsco's first product outside of Dallas, and it was not Fort Worth, but much more distant Houston, where Mapsco again became the first company to make an indexed city street atlas. Unfortunately, the endeavor ended poorly when the glued backs disintegrated in the very humid air of that city, and Mapsco has not produced a Houston map since.

For the first few years, Mapscos were not available to the general public, being intended for business and delivery purposes. Sales were slow until 1956, when the city of Dallas bought 300 copies for their fire and ambulance services. In 1955, Mapsco had adopted a Roman military style indexing system. The entire map was divided into numbered pages, and each page overlaid with a lettered grid, allowing any street to be referenced by a page number plus a grid letter. In Dallas, the grid index has not changed since then (although the number of pages has expanded greatly). At that time, the city was a bewildering array of street names that matched streets in yet unannexed areas, which led to a lot of confusion. Mapsco was the only accurate map of the newly sprawling Sunbelt metropolis. By the late 1950s a Mapsco map became a status symbol.

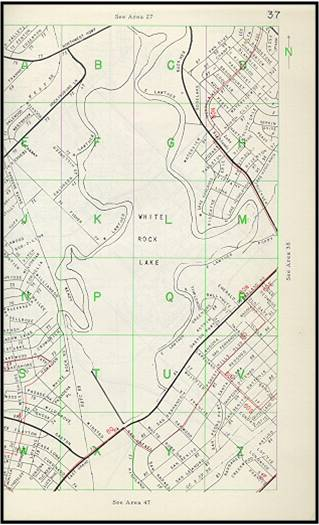
1955 Dallas Mapsco detail

In 1956, Dallas Mapscos began to be sold to the general public from the flower shop. For sales, they hired homeless people off the street. A few books were given to the new "salesman" and if he sold them, he could come back and get some more. If he never came back, they were only out a few books. In 1957, Milton Boyd Keith died and his widow asked his nephew to take over the business. Keith's nephew did not perpetuate the Mapsco but instead took the map bases and formed his own company, called LO-KAT-IT. Keith's widow died soon after, and the Mapsco name all but disappeared. It was about this time that Lily Kendrick, the erstwhile flower shop manager, along with her son Choyce Kendrick, formed a rival company to utilize their mapmaking skills and called it Handymap. The first Handymap was produced in late 1957 and, being more accurate than the rival LO-KAT-IT, undercut its sales. Handymap and the Kendricks were able to acquire the Mapsco naming rights from the Keith family, and the nephew eventually got out of the map business.

On December 5, 1957, Lily Kendrick became the President of Handymap, making it one of Dallas' first companies to be headed by a woman. Milton Boyd Keith's adopted son Donald became vice president, and Lily's son Choyce became the Treasurer. Choyce had ten years in the air conditioning business and was unprepared for the challenges of mapmaking. The Dallas Mapsco, now with the Handymap name on the cover, continued to be produced. With the "succession crisis" now resolved, Mapscos continued to be made in the back of the flower shop for the remainder of the 50s and 60s. In 1959, the plastic spiral binding was changed to a metal wire binding, which continues in use to this day. Donald Keith sold his stock in the company to Lily in 1959, and the founding Keith family exited the map business. Also in that year, Mapsco acquired its main in-town rival, known as JIFFYMAP. The company paid $5,000 for the maps and name.

In 1964, Mapsco expanded the Dallas product and sold it out of the flower shop on Oak Lawn Avenue. In the early 60s, the Dallas Mapsco cost $4.50 each or $3.99 for pre-orders. Additionally, Rand McNally maps and other globe and map products were sold. That year, the company reported a 30% increase in sales over the previous year. Lily retired in 1965 and left the company operations to her son, Choyce, and his wife Frances. In 1970, the company finally outgrew the flower shop and moved to dedicated headquarters at 1644 Irving Blvd in Dallas. The next year, in 1971, Handymap released the first edition of the Fort Worth street guide - the second product in Mapsco's lineup. The early 70s saw Mapsco's sales expand beyond its own store to various retail outlets like gas stations and convenience stores. The energy crisis of 1973 spurred Mapsco sales even further, when oil companies could no longer afford to give out free road maps. Larger sales brought a bigger company, and in 1979 the first profit-sharing plan was enacted.

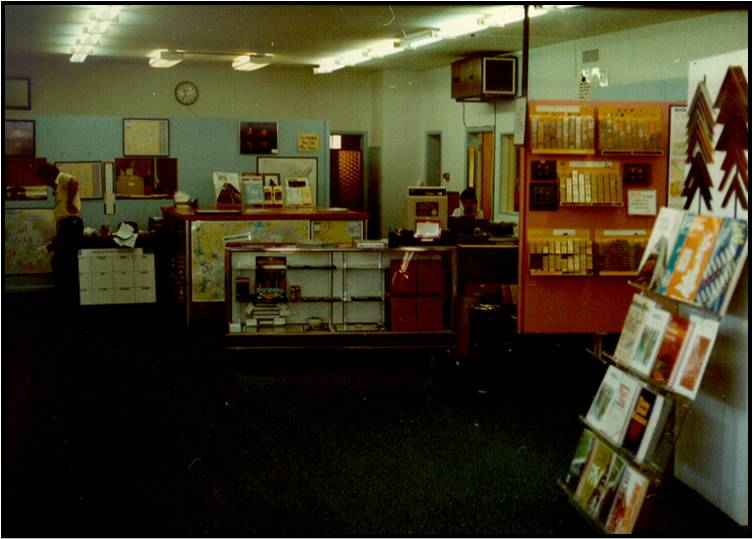
The interior of the Mapsco store in Dallas in the 1970s

On March 31, 1981, Handymap changed its name back to Mapsco, officially, and the "Handymap" name came off the book covers for good. On August 3 of that year Mapsco opened its first retail outlet at Preston Road and Forest Lane in North Dallas. By the early 80s, a Dallas Mapsco cost $10.95 and the book had about 18,000 streets in it. Each year, there were about 750 changes to the Dallas book compared to Fort Worth which had 40% less. In 1984, due to a personal agreement, Choyce Kendrick and Mapsco produced the first Louisville, Kentucky street atlas and it became Mapsco's third book product. Also that year the company topped 100 sales outlets selling Mapsco books - and for the first year sold out of all Dallas and Fort Worth atlases. By the late 80s, Dallas police were reporting that Dallas Mapsco street atlases were the most stolen item from unlocked cars. In 1986, Mapsco needed even more space and moved to a large facility at 5308 Maple Avenue, which also included a new retail store. In 1989, Choyce Kendrick retired from Mapsco and the company left the Kendrick family and was purchased by Dallas-based Rupe Investment Corp.

Mapsco's fourth street guide, Austin, Texas, started publication in 1993 and sold for $23.95. The first book was awkward and did not sell well, but by 1999 the Austin Mapsco was selling out. The next atlas, covering Ellis and Johnson Counties, came out the next year. This was the first suburban Dallas book and was made specifically for traffic related to the cancelled Superconducting Super Collider project. In 1993, the Fort Worth Star Telegram noted that "the Mapsco name... almost certainly equals that of Coca-Cola and McDonald's to DFW residents... the name has become a generic catch-all for local street directories." In 1994, practically every taxi, fire truck, police car, bus, and courier truck had a Dallas Mapsco inside. In March 1994, Rupe Investment purchased Pierson Graphics in Denver, Colorado. Pierson operated independently for several years, but eventually was merged with Mapsco. Street atlases of Denver, Colorado Springs, Fort Collins, and other regional products started to be published by Mapsco. Also in 1994, Mapsco began a multimillion-dollar project to update its mapping to a computerized process. In 1995, Mapsco acquired rights to publish El Paso, Ciudad Juárez and Las Cruces, New Mexico streets guides - thereby expanding into New Mexico and Mexico. In September 1996, Mapsco purchased the Ferguson Map Company in San Antonio, Texas, and began taking over the reins by publishing a San Antonio street atlas.

In 1996, the first Mapsco CD-ROM was produced, and in 1997, the Dallas Street Guide was the first to be completely digitally produced. In 1998, the Dallas and Fort Worth Street guides sold for $31.95. Since that time, more new street guides have been produced. These include all of the DFW metroplex and exurban areas, all of Central Texas and the Texas Hill Country, Oklahoma City and Tulsa. In 2000, Mapsco donated its entire archive to the University of Texas at Arlington. In 2001, Mapsco moved the corporate headquarters from the Maple Avenue location to 4181 Centurion Way in Addison, Texas.

== The Roads of... series ==
In January 2005, Mapsco acquired the rights to The Roads of... series of state atlases. The Roads of Texas was first published in 1988 by Shearer Publishing. As of 2008, titles exist for Colorado, New Mexico, Oklahoma, Arkansas, Louisiana, North Carolina, and Kentucky.

== Map & Travel Center locations ==
As of 2015, Mapsco has two locations: one in Addison, Texas, located inside their corporate facility and one in Fort Worth, Texas.

The Mapsco.com online store, and website, shut down.

== Map & Travel Center closures ==
The Mapsco Map & Travel Center located in Austin, Texas, closed on March 19, 2010. The Mapsco Map & Travel Center located in North Dallas, Texas, closed on March 26, 2010. Mapsco Map & Travel Centers in San Antonio, Texas, and Denver, Colorado, closed at the end of March 2010.
