= Machpelah Cemetery =

Machpelah Cemetery may refer to:

- Machpelah Cemetery (Mount Sterling, Kentucky)
- Machpelah Cemetery (Lexington, Missouri), listed on the US National Register of Historic Places in Lafayette County
- Machpelah Cemetery (North Bergen, New Jersey)
- Machpelah Cemetery (Le Roy, New York)
- Machpelah Cemetery (Queens), New York

== See also ==
- Machpelah Cave, biblical burial site
