= Frank J. Bart =

American soldier, recipient of the Medal of Honor (1883–1961)

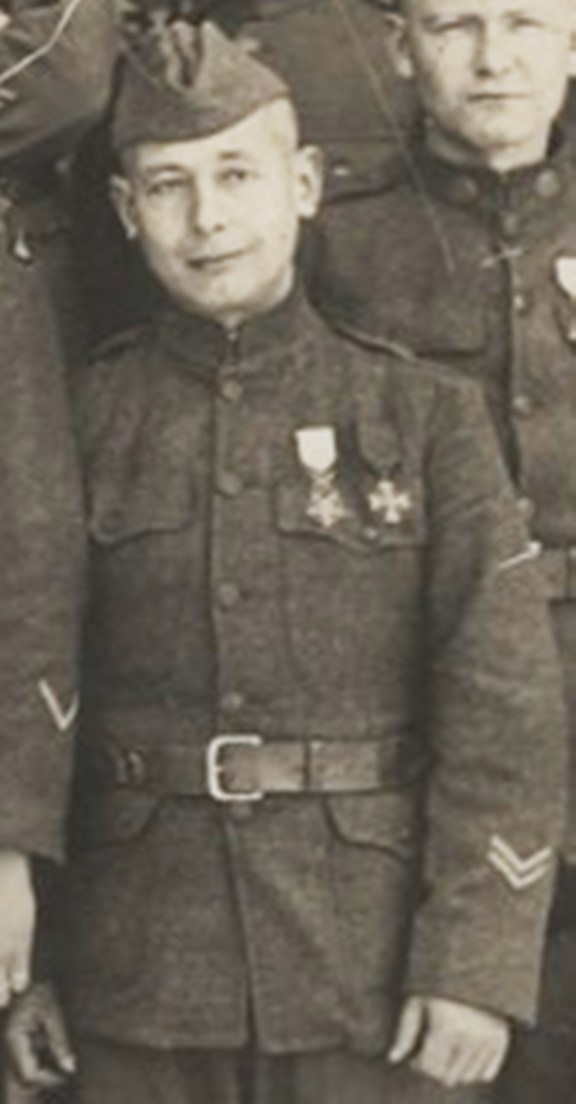
- Medal of Honor recipient
- Born: April 15, 1883; New York City, US
- Died: March 31, 1961 (aged 77)
- Burial place: Flower Hill Cemetery; North Bergen, New Jersey
- Military career
- Allegiance: United States of America
- Branch: United States Army
- Rank: Sergeant
- Service number: 38512
- Units: 9th Infantry, 2nd Division
- Conflicts: World War I
- Awards: Medal of Honor

Frank J. Bart (April 15, 1883 – March 31, 1961) was a Medal of Honor recipient for World War I.

Born in New York City, he joined the United States Army in Newark, New Jersey, during World War I, as a private in Company C, 9th Infantry, 2nd Division. He received the Medal of Honor for bravery near Medeah Ferme, France, on October 3, 1918.

He was buried in Flower Hill Cemetery in North Bergen, New Jersey.

== Medal of Honor citation ==
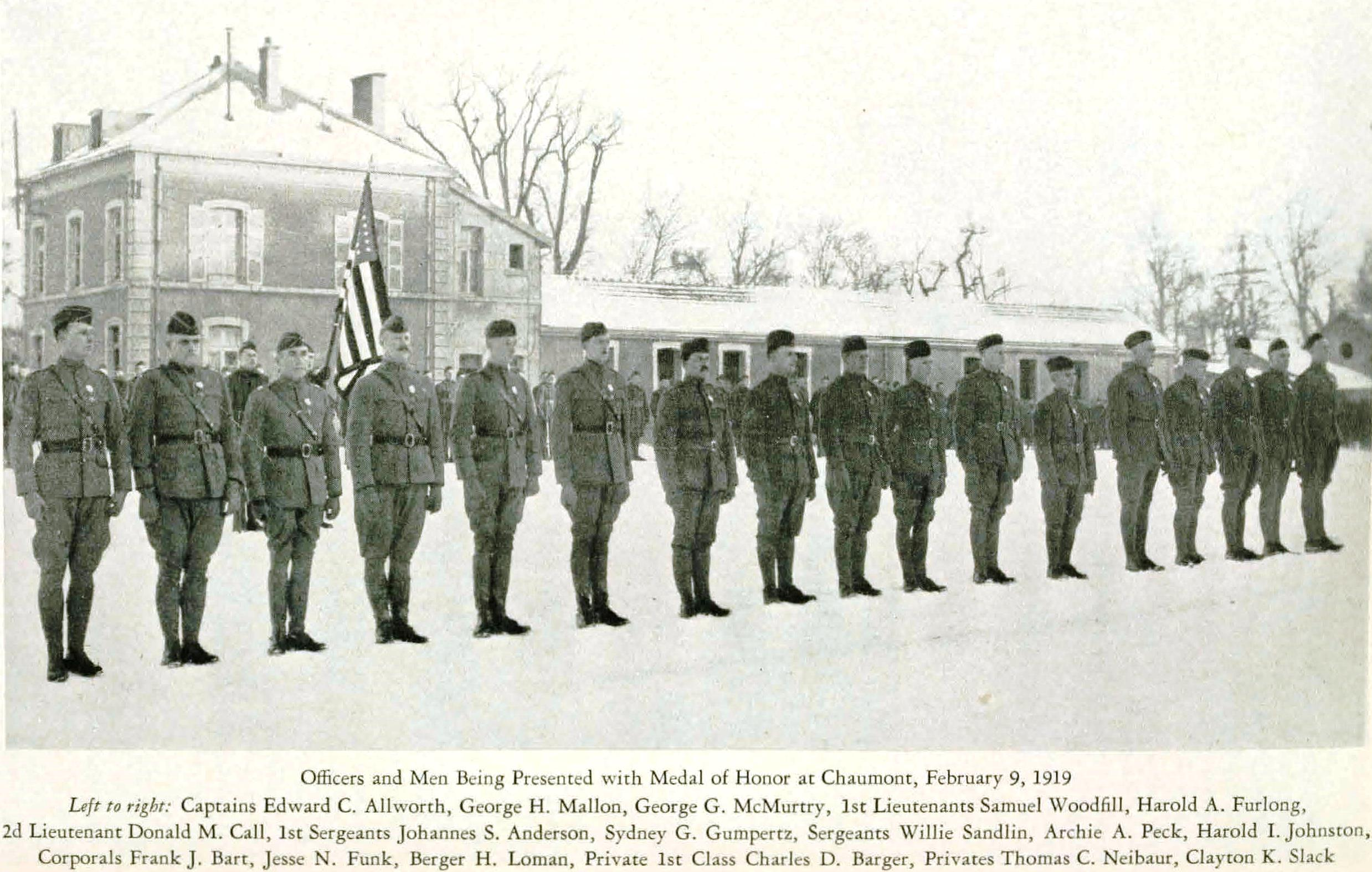
Medal of Honor Presentation Ceremony - February 9, 1919, at Chaumont, France. General John J. Pershing presided.

General Orders: War Department, General Orders No. 16 (January 22, 1919)
Action Date: 3-Oct-18
Service: Army
Rank: Private
Company: Company C
Regiment: 9th Infantry
Division: 2d Division

The President of the United States of America, in the name of Congress, takes pleasure in presenting the Medal of Honor to Private Frank J. Bart (ASN: 38512), United States Army, for extraordinary heroism on 3 October 1918, while serving with Company C, 9th Infantry, 2d Division, in action at Medeah Ferme, France. Private Bart, being on duty as a company runner, when the advance was held up by machinegun fire voluntarily picked up an automatic rifle, ran out ahead of the line, and silenced a hostile machinegun nest, killing the German gunners. The advance then continued, and when it was again hindered shortly afterward by another machinegun nest this courageous soldier repeated his bold exploit by putting the second machinegun out of action.

== Military awards and decorations ==
Bart's military decorations and awards include:

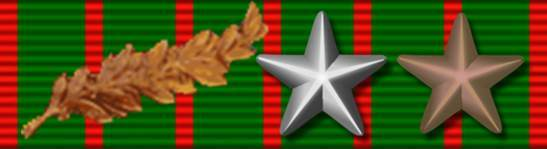

1st row	Medal of Honor	Silver Star w/one bronze oak leaf cluster		
2nd row	Purple Heart		World War I Victory Medal w/one silver service star to denote credit for the Aisne, Aisne-Marne, St. Mihiel, Meuse-Argonne and Defensive Sector battle clasps.	Médaille militaire (French Republic)
3rd row	Croix de guerre 1914–1918 w/bronze palm, one silver star and one bronze star (French Republic)		Croce al Merito di Guerra (Italy)	Medal for Military Bravery (Kingdom of Montenegro)
Unit Award	French Fourragère - Authorized permanent wear based on three French Croix de Guerre with Palm unit citations awarded the 9th Infantry Regiment for Chateau-Thierry, Aisne-Marne and Meuse-Argonne			

== See also ==
- List of Medal of Honor recipients
- List of Medal of Honor recipients for World War I
