= Jersey City and Harsimus Cemetery =

Historic cemetery in Jersey City, New Jersey

Coordinates: 40°43′38″N 74°3′17″W

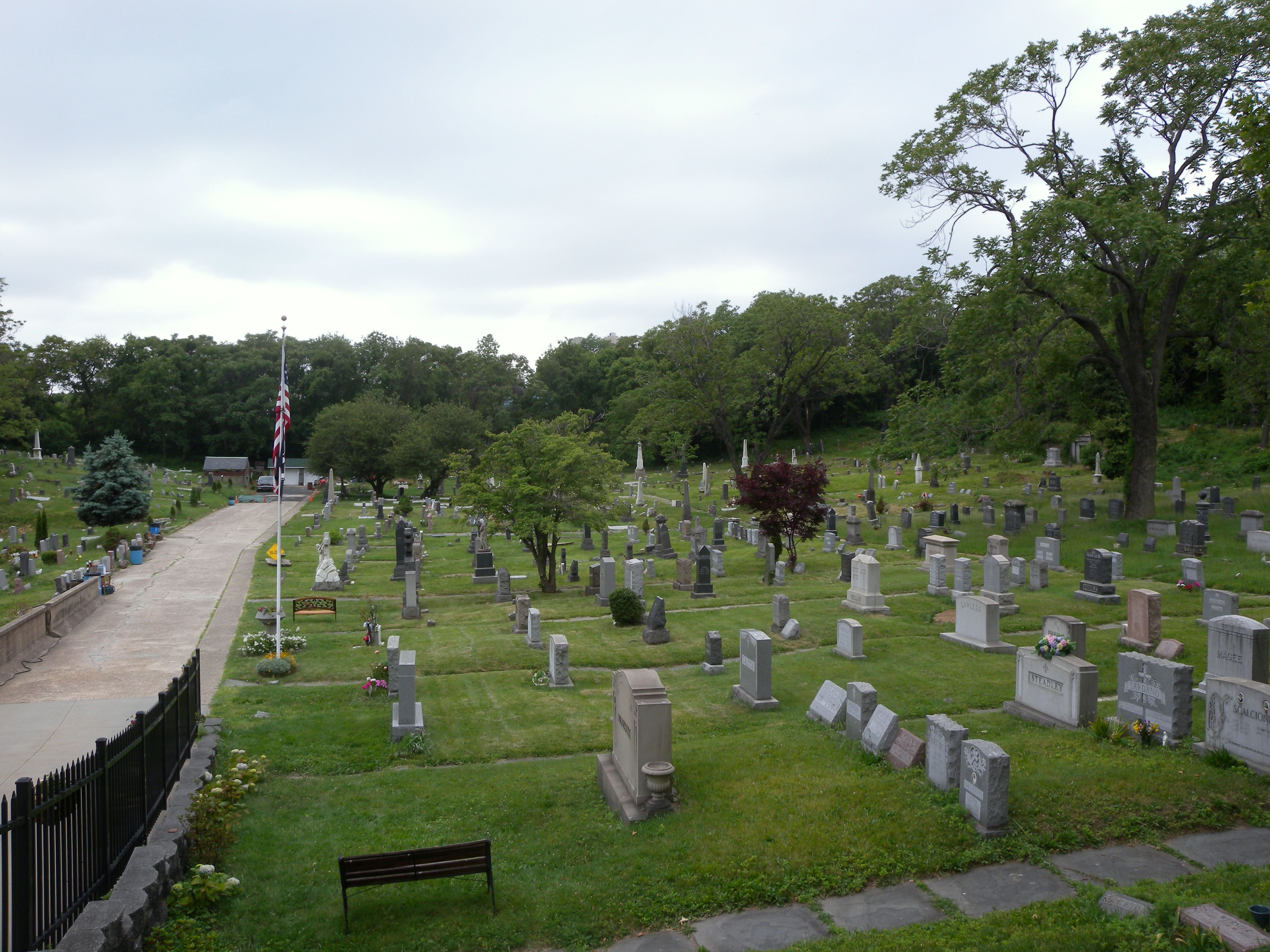
- Interactive map of Jersey City and Harsimus Cemetery

Details
- Established: 1829
- Location: 435 Newark Avenue; Jersey City, New Jersey
- Country: United States
- Size: 6 acres (24,000 m^{2})
- Website: www.jerseycitycemetery.org

Jersey City and Harsimus Cemetery is a historic rural cemetery located in Jersey City, New Jersey. It was established in 1829 by the first cemetery company founded in the State of New Jersey and covers an area of 6 acres (24,000 m^{2}). The cemetery is an early example of Garden Style landscape cemeteries. The cemetery fell into disrepair and was abandoned in 2008. A volunteer group has since been founded to maintain the cemetery.

The location of the cemetery was used as an ammunition bunker for the War of 1812 and was a site of skirmishes in 1780 during the Revolutionary War.

Since 2011, goats are used for weed control during the summer.

== Events ==
In order to raise funds for the upkeep of the grounds and caretaker facilities, the all-volunteer organization has partnered with local groups to produce year round events. Events include:

- The Ghost of Uncle Joe – A music and theatrical event that occurs in October
- Shakespeare in the Park by the Hudson Shakespeare Company. The main Shakespeare company of Hudson County has the cemetery as one of its tour stops on its regular summer tours.
- Halloween tours
- Constitution Day – A yearly event that takes place at the end of September celebrating the different eras of veterans buried in the cemetery. Eras date from the Revolutionary War to World War II.

== Notable burials ==
- Charles F. Durant (1805–1873), made the first ascent by an American in a hot air balloon

== See also ==
- List of cemeteries in Hudson County, New Jersey
