= Kappa Publishing Group =

Pennsylvania publisher founded in 1955

- Founded: 1955; 70 years ago
- Founder: H.L. Herbert
- Country of origin: United States
- Headquarters location: Blue Bell, Pennsylvania
- Publication types: Books, magazines, maps
- Official website: kappapublishing.com

Kappa Publishing Group, Inc. is a Blue Bell, Pennsylvania-based publishing company concentrating on adult puzzle books and magazines as well as children's magazines and maps. It is a private company founded in 1955 with $11.5 million in annual sales.

== History ==
In January 2012, Kappa announced that they had acquired Modern Publishing.

== Subsidiaries ==
It has a number of subsidiary companies, such as London Publishing or GAMES Publications. Its original owner, H.L. Herbert ("Larry") founded his puzzle business, Official Publications in Manhattan with titles including Teen Word-Finds, Superb Word-Finds, Variety Word-Finds and countless crossword puzzle, crosspatch and fill-it-in titles. Sons Anthony Herbert (Editorial Director) and Paul Herbert (Sales) helped the business grow to the success it became. Edward Tobias was the Editor. Prior to Mr. Herbert, Sr.'s passing in the 1980s, he sold the business to Nick Karabots, who owned the printer where the titles were being printed. The business was then moved to Ft. Washington, PA. Top word-find contributors in the early 80's included Rich Latta and Frank J. D'Agostino.

== Brands ==
Kappa Publishing Group has a number of brands used for publishing magazines and books for puzzles and games.

- GAMES, which is used for GAMES Magazine and other magazines and books
- Official, such as for Official's Logic Puzzles and Official's Variety Puzzles
- Blue Ribbon, such as for Blue Ribbon Word Find
- Children's Fun Puzzles

== Kappa Map Group ==
Kappa began acquiring map publishers in 2007 with the acquisition of Universal Map. It acquired Mapsco in March 2010 and the map division of travel publisher Langenscheidt in August, including its brands ADC (Alexandria Drafting Company), Arrow Map, Hagstrom Map, American Map and Trakker Map. The Kappa Map Group suddenly ceased operations in early 2022 when the group's Managing Director departed for another position and no so-called "white knight" was found to rescue the mapping group. Decades of cartographic work was abandoned when the Map Group closed down.

== Publications ==
Kappa publishes Pro Wrestling Illustrated and Horoscope Guide. Former boxing publications include:

- The Ring
- KO Magazine
- World Boxing

== Lawsuit ==
In December 2005, Kappa Publishing settled a class-action lawsuit in which they were accused of sending junk faxes. The settlement was for $1.5 million to 13,500 potential class members, $560,000 in attorneys' fees and expenses and $65,000 for administrative expenses.
