= Garden State Crematory =

Crematorium in North Bergen, New Jersey, US

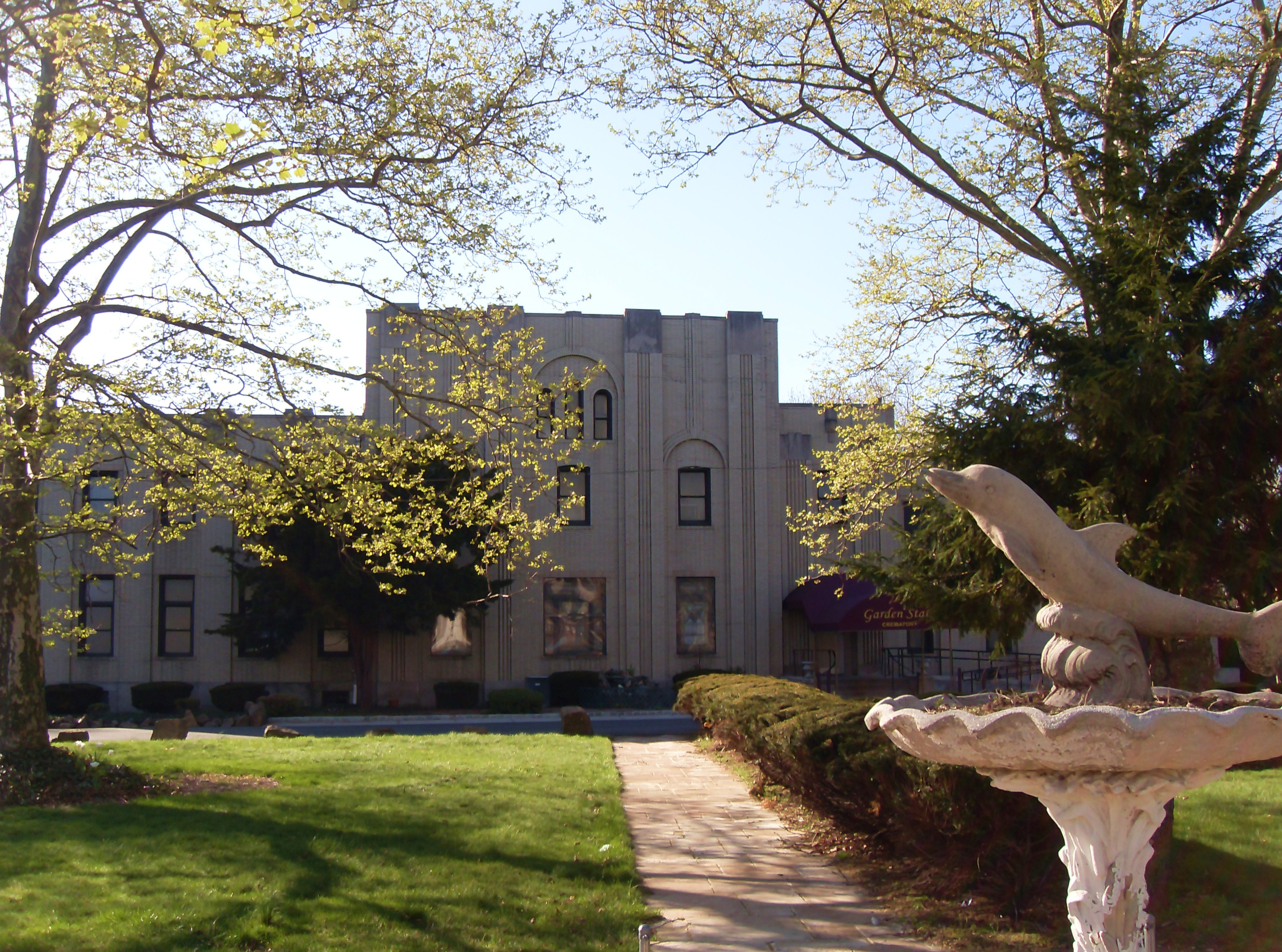
- View from the center field of the front entrance.
- Interactive map of Garden State Crematory

Details
- Established: 1907
- Location: North Bergen, New Jersey
- Country: United States
- Coordinates: 40.7785°N 74.0280°W
- Find a Grave: Garden State Crematory

Garden State Crematory is crematory and mausoleum located at 4101 Kennedy Boulevard in North Bergen, New Jersey. The back of the building overlooks the Weehawken Cemetery and it is adjacent to the Bergen Crest Mausoleum.

== History ==
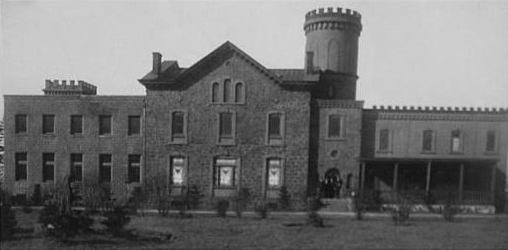
Photograph from 1907 of the newly renovated Crematory.

In the 19th century, the New York and New Jersey Cremation Company performed cremations inside of Becker's Castle, a brownstone structure on the west side of then 'Hudson Boulevard' (now Kennedy Boulevard). In 1907, the company remodeled the building, dividing the roomspaces into thousands of niches for urns and adding a two-story wing to the south side.

== Hindu ceremonial expansion ==
When the demand for the remains of Hindu customers being housed inside the complex during the 1980s to the 1990s rose, a basement room was converted into a small Hindu chapel. An altar was placed in front of a large picture of Shiva; other deities adorning the chapel included Ganesha, Hanuman, Durga and Krishna. It was completed in 1997.

== Notable cremations ==
- Albert Dekker (1905–1968), stage and television actor
- Roy Oscar Miller (1883–1938), Major League Baseball player
- Conrad Nagel (1897–1970), silent film and television actor
- Madeline Kahn (1942–1999), film and television actress
- Sid Vicious (1957–1979), musician/bassist with Sex Pistols
- Joan Rivers (1933–2014), comedian and actress
- Míriam Colón (1936–2017), Puerto Rican actress
- Kate Spade (1962–2018), American fashion designer and businesswoman

== See also ==
- List of cemeteries in Hudson County, New Jersey
