= Palisades Cemetery =

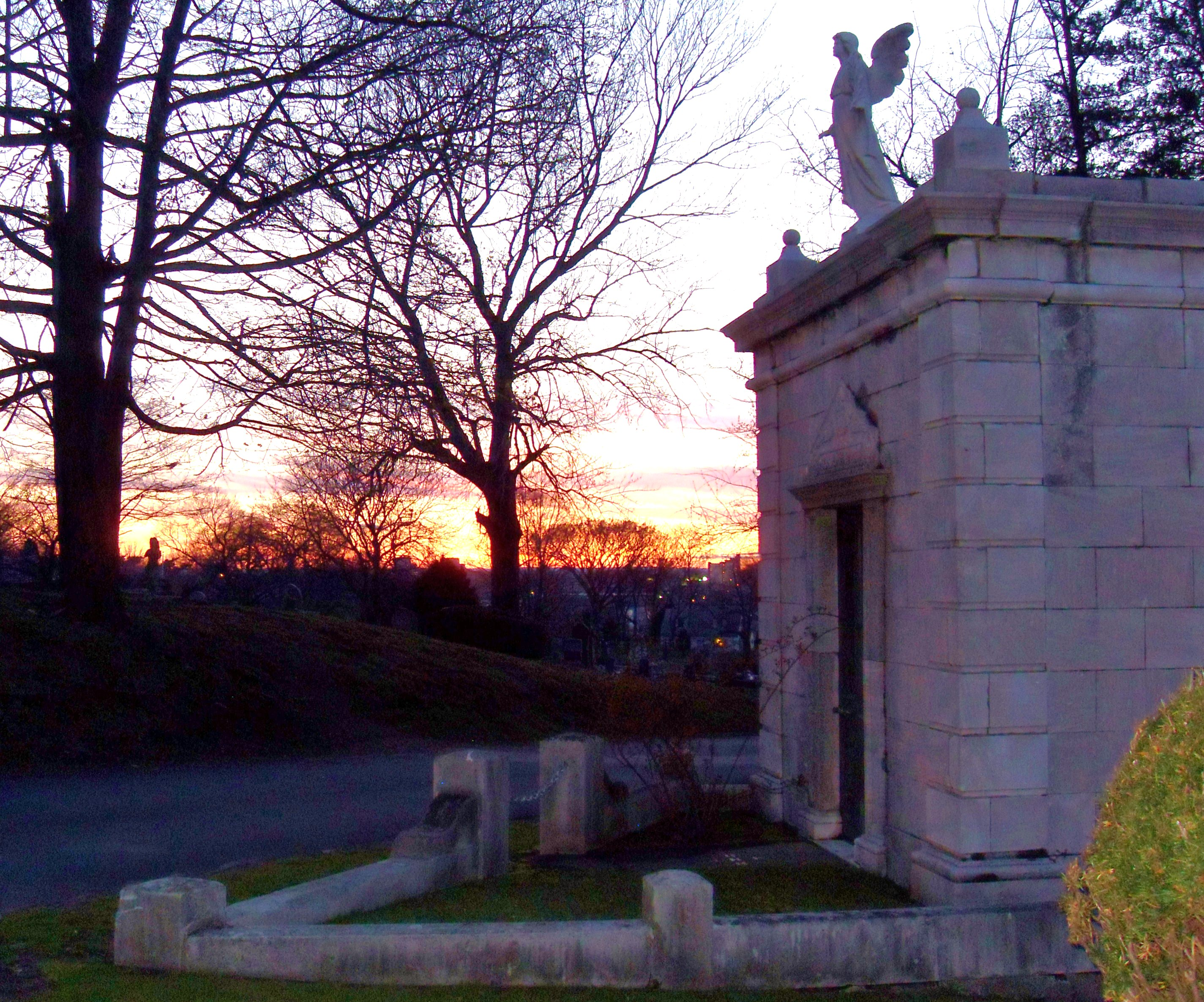
- East side of the cemetery overlooking hillside.
- Interactive map of Palisades Cemetery

Details
- Location: Bergen Turnpike, North Bergen, New Jersey, US
- Country: United States
- Coordinates: 40.7792°N 74.0331°W
- No. of graves: 1,500+
- Find a Grave: Palisades Cemetery

The Palisades Cemetery is located on the cuesta, or descending ridge of the Palisades in North Bergen, New Jersey. Its main entrance on Bergen Turnpike and Union Turnpike. It is adjacent to the Weehawken Cemetery and is one of several on the western slope of North Hudson County.

== See also ==
- List of cemeteries in Hudson County, New Jersey
