= Weehawken Cemetery =

Cemetery in New Jersey, U.S.

Coordinates: 40.7795°N 74.0302°W

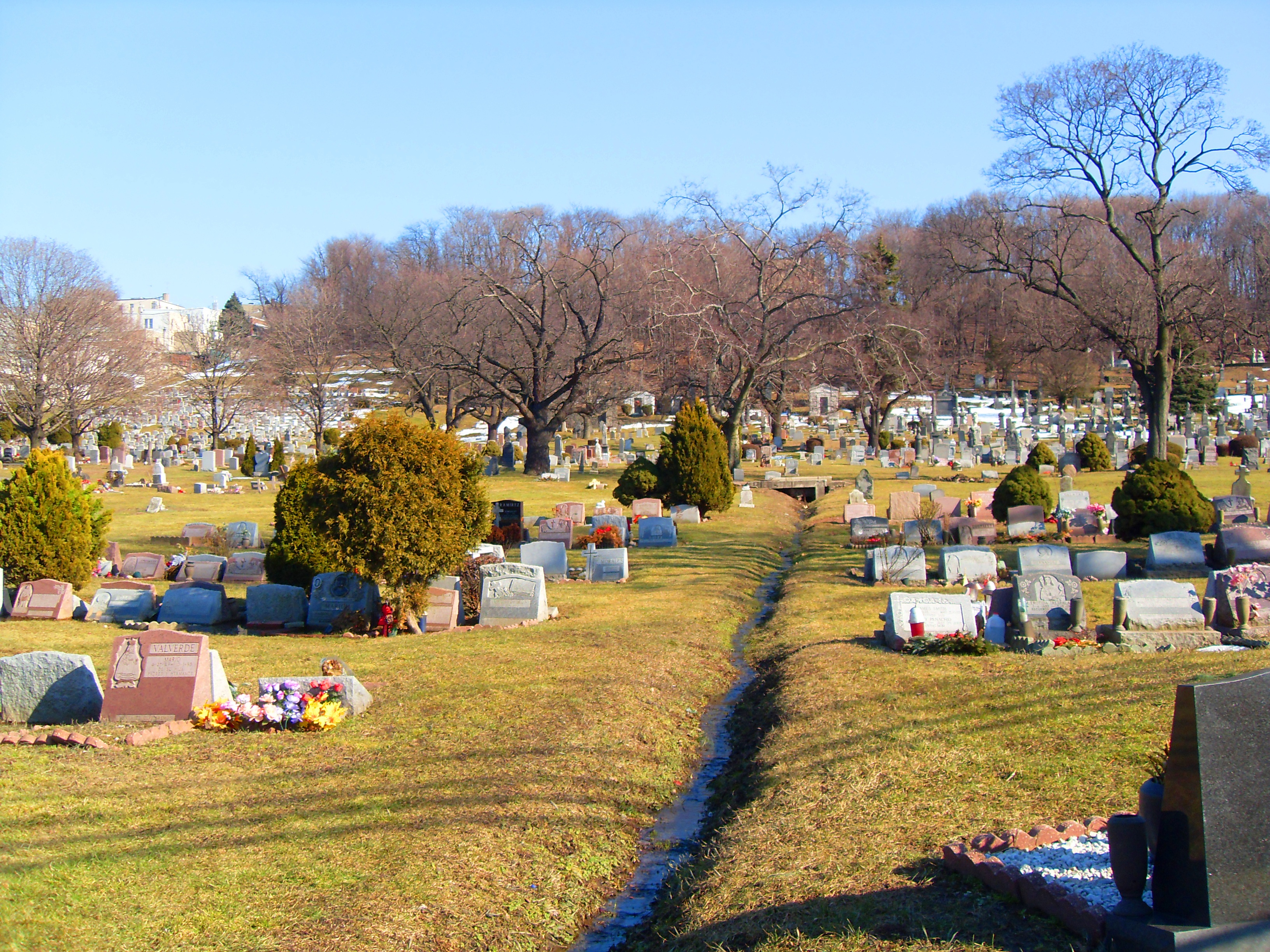
- East side of the Cemetery near the gate
- Interactive map of Weehawken Cemetery

Details
- Location: Bergen Turnpike, North Bergen, New Jersey
- Country: United States

The Weehawken Cemetery, like neighboring Hoboken Cemetery, is not located in its namesake town of Weehawken but rather on the western slope of the Hudson Palisades in North Bergen, New Jersey, United States. Its main entrance is on Bergen Turnpike. At its east side the cemetery is overlooked by the Bergen Crest Mausoleum and the Garden State Crematory. and nearby Flower Hill Cemetery.

In December 2018 owner of the cemetery were ordered to halt work with felling trees when it was established that erosion could cause damage to existing graves on the hillside.

== Notable burials ==
Unclaimed bodies found after the collapse of the first attempt at the construction of the Uptown Hudson Tubes in 1880, a project later abandoned until 1908, were buried at the cemetery.

- Albert Vadas (1877–1946)

== See also ==
- List of cemeteries in Hudson County, New Jersey
