= Hoboken Cemetery =

Cemetery in North Bergen, New Jersey

- Interactive map of Hoboken Cemetery

Details
- Location: North Bergen, New Jersey
- Country: United States
- Coordinates: 40.788157°N 74.025140°W
- Find a Grave: Hoboken Cemetery

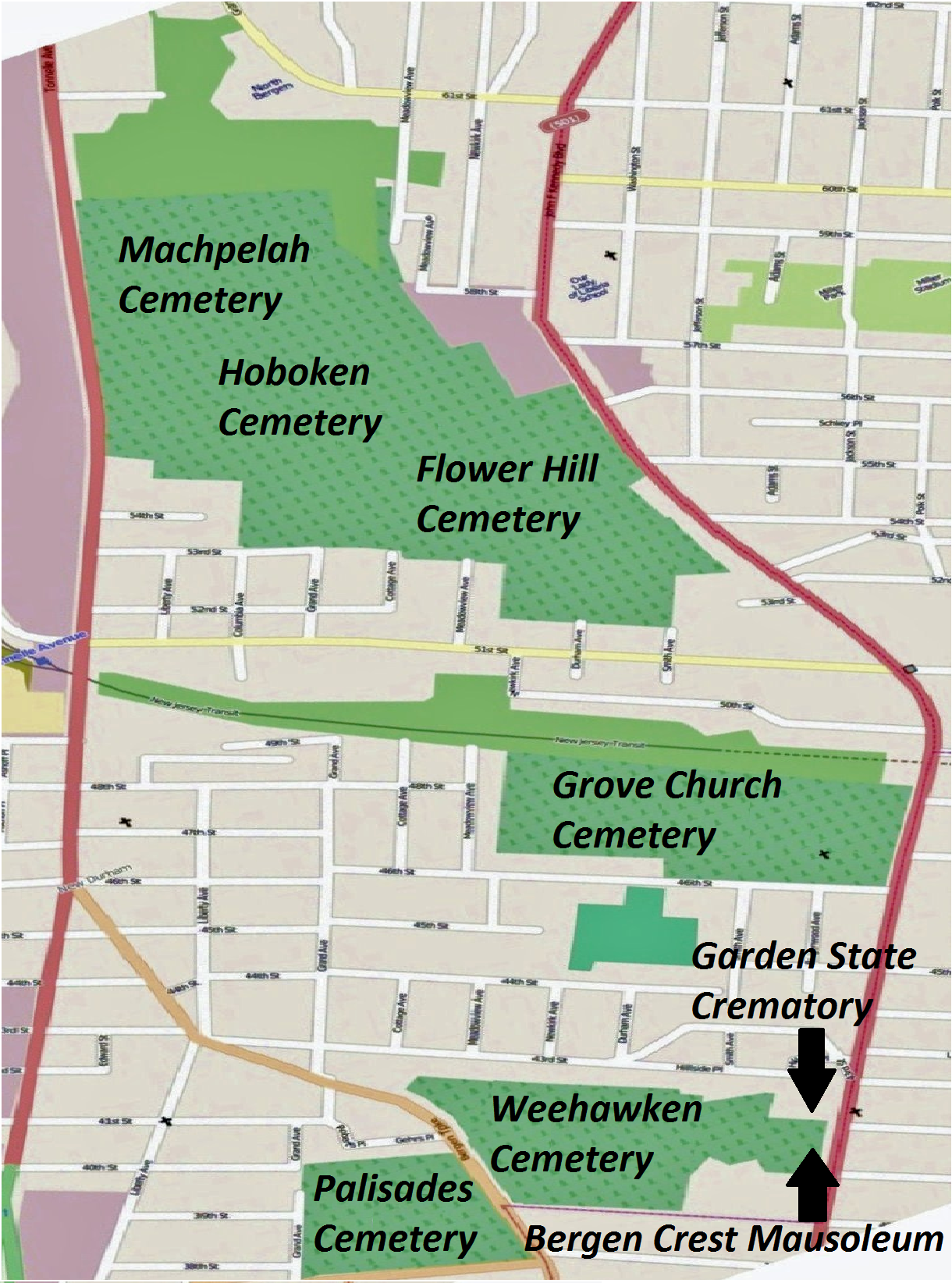
Cemeteries on the western slope of the Palisades in northern Hudson County.

The Hoboken Cemetery is located at 5500 Tonnelle Avenue in North Bergen, New Jersey, United States. in the New Durham section. It was owned by the City of Hoboken. Although appearing well groomed and cared when first arriving at the Hoboken Cemetery, just a short walk in any direction and you will find a different story. It is bordered by Flower Hill Cemetery. The Secaucus Junction was built on land that was partially the Hudson County Burial Grounds. The exhumed bodies were to be re-interred at the Hoboken Cemetery, but was later cancelled when the cemetery was found to have been recycling older full graves without tombstones and selling them as virgin plots. The cemetery said it has no record of any bodies being buried in those plots.

== Notable burials ==
- Oscar Louis Auf der Heide (1874–1945), mayor of West New York, New Jersey.
- Allan Langdon McDermott (1854–1908), US Congressman.
- Henry Otto Wittpenn (1871–1931), mayor of Jersey City, New Jersey.
- Edwin Ruthvin Vincent Wright (1812–1871), represented New Jersey's 5th congressional district from 1865–1867.

== See also ==
- Machpelah Cemetery
- List of cemeteries in Hudson County, New Jersey
