= Flower Hill Cemetery (North Bergen, New Jersey) =

Coordinates: 40.788157°N 74.025140°W

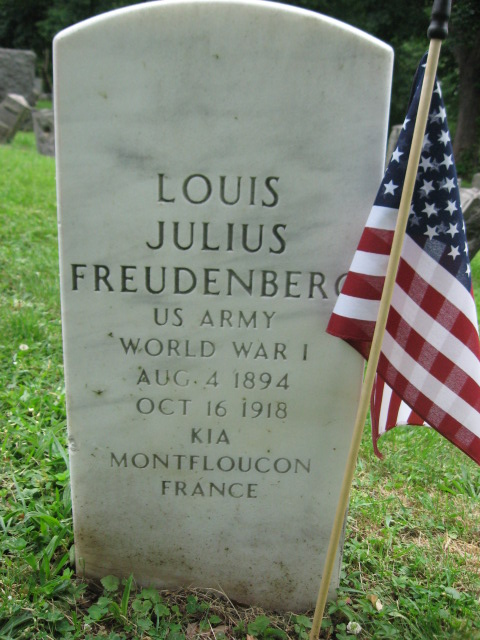
- Interactive map of Flower Hill Cemetery

Details
- Established: 1873
- Location: North Bergen, New Jersey
- Country: United States
- Find a Grave: Flower Hill Cemetery

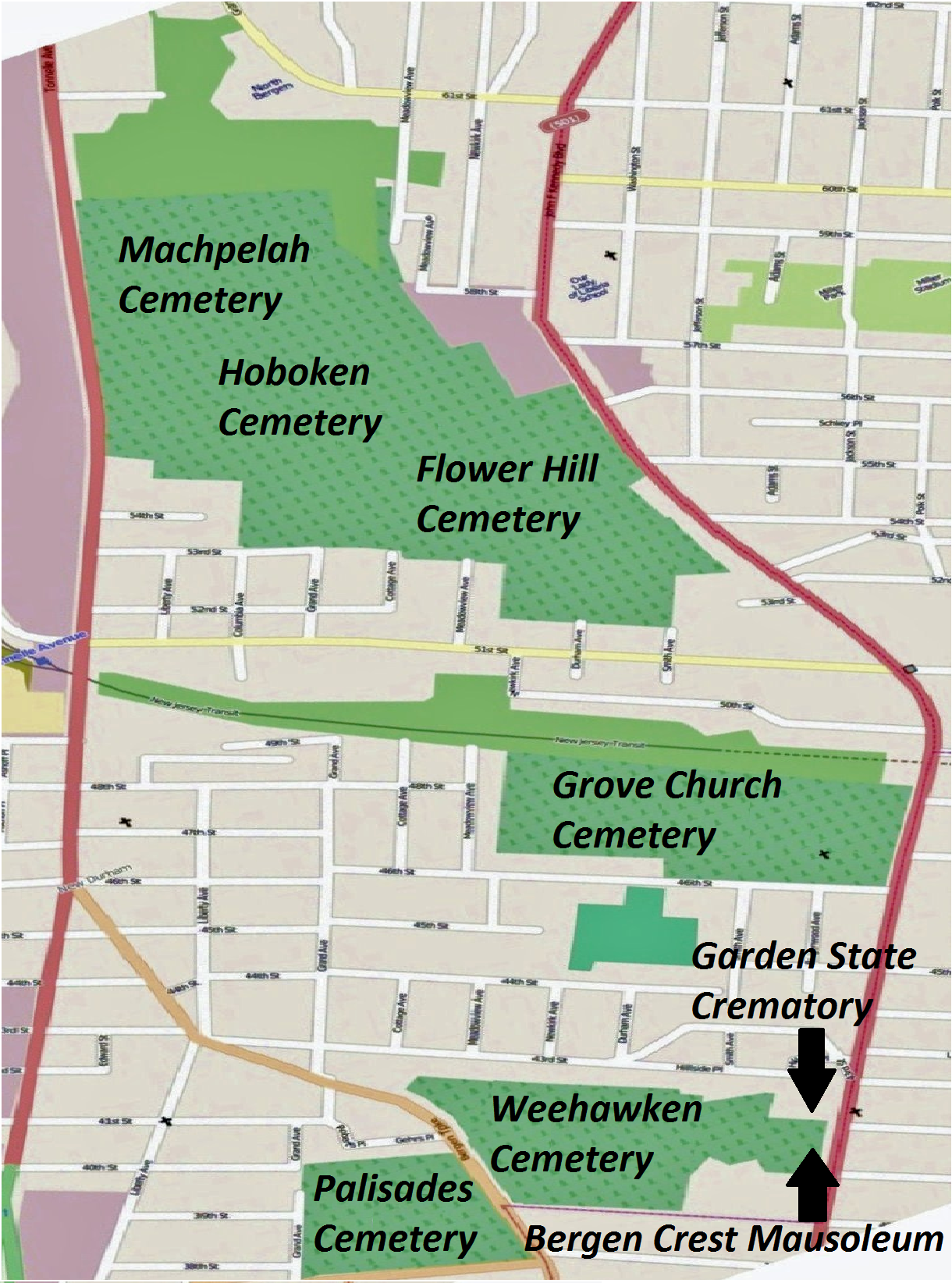
Cemeteries on the western slope of the Palisades in northern Hudson County

Flower Hill Cemetery is located in North Bergen, New Jersey. It is cojoined with Hoboken Cemetery and Machpelah Cemetery.

== History ==
In 1900, many who died in the fire of the SS Saale and SS Bremen on the North River (Hudson River) at Hoboken were interred at the cemetery. Some of the others who perished in the massive fire on the Hoboken piers in 1900 were buried at the adjacent cemeteries in gravesites purchased by the shipping company.

Headstones of interest include those of American Civil War soldiers Decatur Dorsey and Christian Woerner, and the side-by-side headstones of World War I Army privates Horace Shields and Freeman Norris, who died just over a month apart in June and July 1949. One headstone regarded as among the most interesting is the faux tree-trunk of Frank and Sally Bello, who died in 1956 and 1992, respectively, and which was dedicated by their children. Among those regarded as the most poignant are the Guidotti plot and the Adolph Lankering Family Vault. The former includes a four-foot-tall headstone with a right-hand side column with a curled leaves etching. At the top of the column is depicted a tree branch cross and roses, and chiseled oval spaces for the four children, two of which are filled as of 2013.

== Notable burials ==
- Ed Alberian (1920–1997) children's television actor and entertainer
- Frank J. Bart (1883–1961) World War I Medal of Honor recipient
- Decatur Dorsey (1836–1891) Civil War Medal of Honor recipient
- William Joseph Peter (1832–1918), brewer, painter, philanthropist
- Charles Schreyvogel, (1861–1912), American painter known for Western scenes
- One Commonwealth war grave of a Royal Marine Light Infantry Private of World War I.

== See also ==
- List of cemeteries in Hudson County, New Jersey
