= Hagstrom Map =

US brand of road maps

- Founder: Andrew Hagstrom
- Defunct: 2022
- Fate: Division of Kappa Publishing Group
- Headquarters: Maspeth, Queens, United States
- Website: kappamapgroup.com/brands/hagstrom/

Hagstrom Map, based in Maspeth, Queens, was the best-selling brand of road maps in the New York City metropolitan area from the mid-20th to early 21st century. The New York Times in 2002 described Hagstrom's Five Borough Atlas as New York City's "map of record" for the previous 60 years.

With the rise of GPS navigation and other electronic maps in the early 2000s, the printed-map business shrank to a fraction of its former size, undergoing extensive consolidation. In 2009, the Maspeth headquarters were shut down; production then moved to Deland, Florida with the company's acquisition by the Kappa Publishing Group who placed Hagstrom in its Kappa Map Group entity. The Kappa Map Group suddenly ceased operations in early 2022 when the group's Managing Director departed for another position and no so-called "white knight" was found to rescue the mapping group. Decades of cartographic work was abandoned when the Map Group closed down.

== History ==
Andrew Hagstrom was a Swedish immigrant to the United States. in 1909. While working as a farmhand and in the meatpacking industry, he studied graphic arts at the New York Mechanics Institute. He then formed a drafting business in lower Manhattan, c. 1916.

To demonstrate his skills to potential customers, and also help them find his business, the new businessman produced a map of his shop location. The map featured exaggeratedly wide streets that offered abundant room for clear labeling of addresses, transportation, and other terrain features. The map proved popular, and he began selling it, forming the Hagstrom Map Company in 1916. He expanded coverage to all of Manhattan, then all of New York City, then its outlying regions, eventually offering over 100 maps. The New York City Subway used a Hagstrom design for its official subway maps during the 1940s and up to 1958.

In 1968, Hagstrom was acquired by Macmillan Publishers; Macmillan sold Hagstrom to the Langenscheidt publishing group in 1981. In 2010, Kappa Publishing Group acquired the Hagstrom brand from Langenscheidt after the latter decided to sell off its U.S. operations. During the 1970s and 1980s, Hagstrom's catalog included maps of a number of cities beyond the New York area, including Atlanta, Boston, Chicago, Columbus, Dallas, Houston, Indianapolis, and Philadelphia. Most of these publications were out of print by the late 1990s.

Hagstrom had three retail stores: one in Lower Manhattan, one in Midtown, and one in Washington, D.C.; the last of which closed in 2010.

Andrew Hagstrom was knighted by the King of Sweden for his success in America.

== Style ==
The widened-street style was a hallmark of Hagstrom's product line; although it added clarity in navigation and labeling, the widened streets borrowed their space from the surrounding blocks, in some cases reducing them to slivers; for instance, the Flatiron Building appeared as "a speck where Broadway and Fifth Avenue converge". From 1941 to 2002, all of Hagstrom's New York City maps were based on a single master map that was updated by hand. This produced a number of other visual artifacts; new streets and neighborhoods had to be shoehorned into layouts designed around previously existing features. A number of quirky and archaic labels also remained, such as "The Shed", a large disused building on Pier 42 on the East River, and Mussel Island, a long-gone feature of Newtown Creek – a location not far from Hagstrom's building in Maspeth.

In 2002, Hagstrom switched to all-digital master maps using more conventional layouts and labels.

In its heyday, the company's lineup included atlases, borough maps, maps of the Tri-State Region and detailed and quite colorful maps of midtown Manhattan. The midtown maps, which detailed most of the significant buildings and businesses (Rockefeller Center, Pennsylvania Station, Saks Fifth Avenue, etc.) show the changing face of the city's business district, and have started to draw the attention of map collectors.
