= List of neighborhoods in North Bergen, New Jersey =

Populated places in Hudson County, New Jersey, US

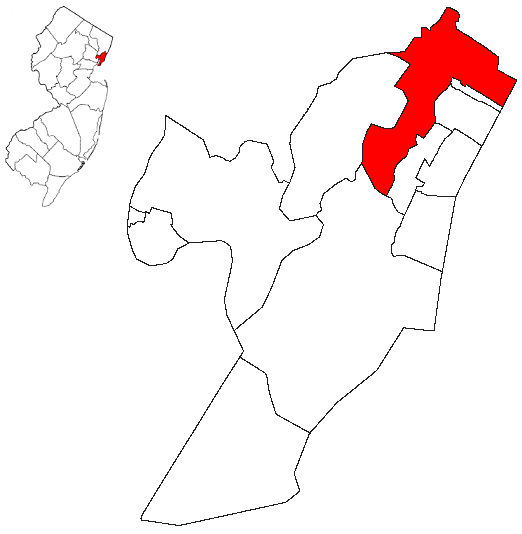
Map highlighting North Bergen within Hudson County. Inset: Location of Hudson County in New Jersey.

The following is a list of neighborhoods in North Bergen, New Jersey.

- Bergenline runs to Nungesser's at the Fairview border near North Hudson Park.
- Bigleys/Three Ditches-a wetlands area between the Northeast Corridor and Secaucus Road.
- Racetrack Section-between Bergenline and Kennedy Boulevard on the palisades plateau
- Bergenwood, on the steep slopes of the west side of the Palisades
- New Durham site of colonial American Three Pigeons near the Bergen Turnpike and Tonnelle Avenue
- Meadowview, behind the Municipal Building between the many cemeteries:
  - Flower Hill Cemetery, Hoboken Cemetery, and Weehawken Cemetery
- Bulls Ferry on the Hudson Waterfront, site of Roc Harbor, Palisades Medical Center and Hudson River Waterfront Walkway
- Babbitt from the rail station near North Bergen Yard in Meadowlands
- Woodcliff on the Hudson Palisades around North Hudson Park
- Transfer Station near the single point border Union City and Jersey City near Paterson Plank Road, Kennedy Boulevard, and Secaucus Road.
- Schuetzen Park/Columbia Park at Kennedy Boulevard where Hackensack Plank Road becomes the Bergen Turnpike

== See also ==
Other historical unincorporated communities, localities and place names located partially or completely within the township include Tyler Park, Homestead, Three Pigeons, Maisland, Granton, Hudson Heights, and Shadyside.

== Sources ==
Hudson County New Jersey Street Map. Hagstrom Map Company, Inc. 2008. ISBN 978-0-88097-763-0.
