= Woodcliff, North Bergen =

Populated place in Hudson County, New Jersey, US

Coordinates: 40.79861°N 74.00391°W

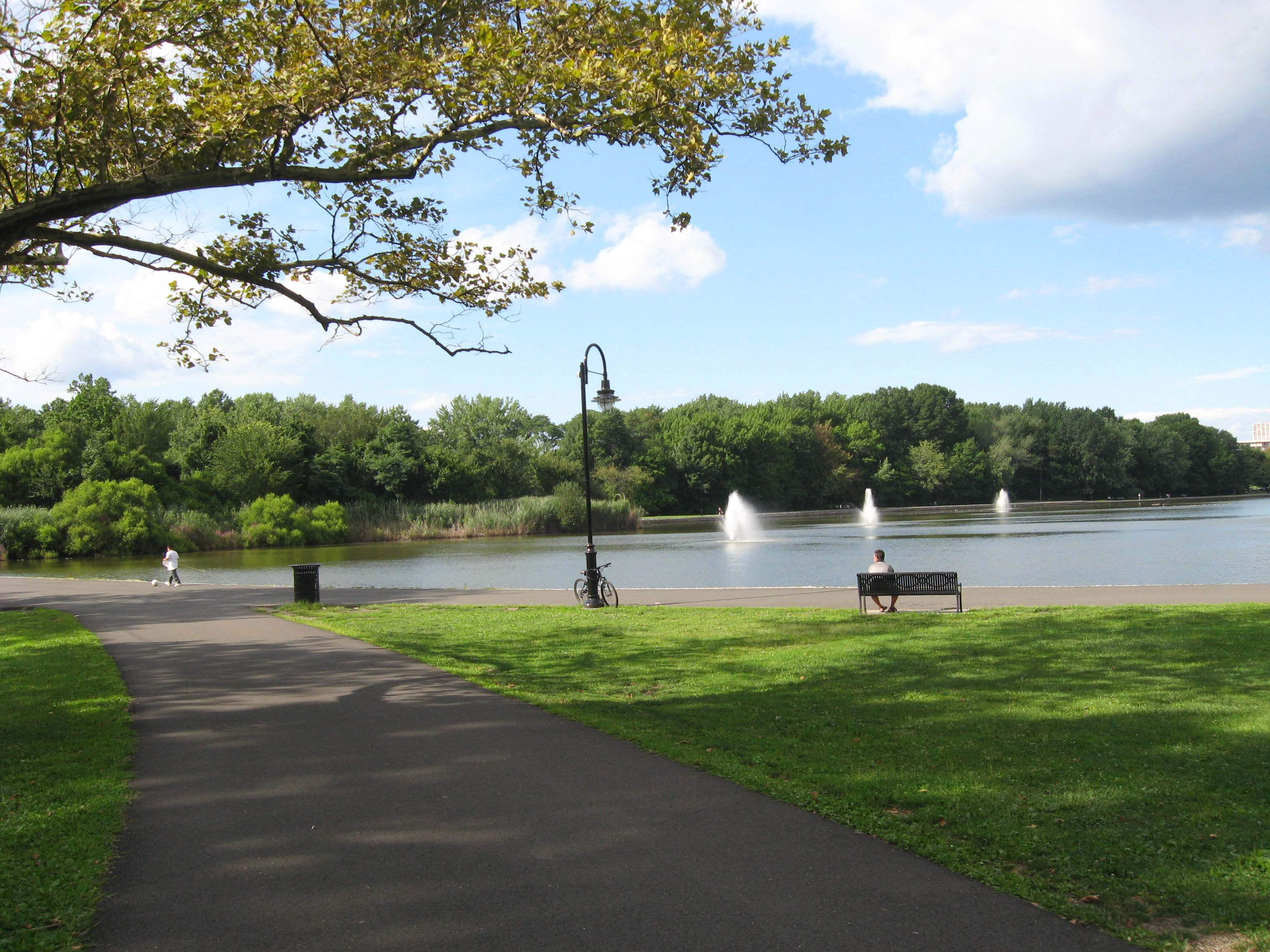
North Hudson Park.

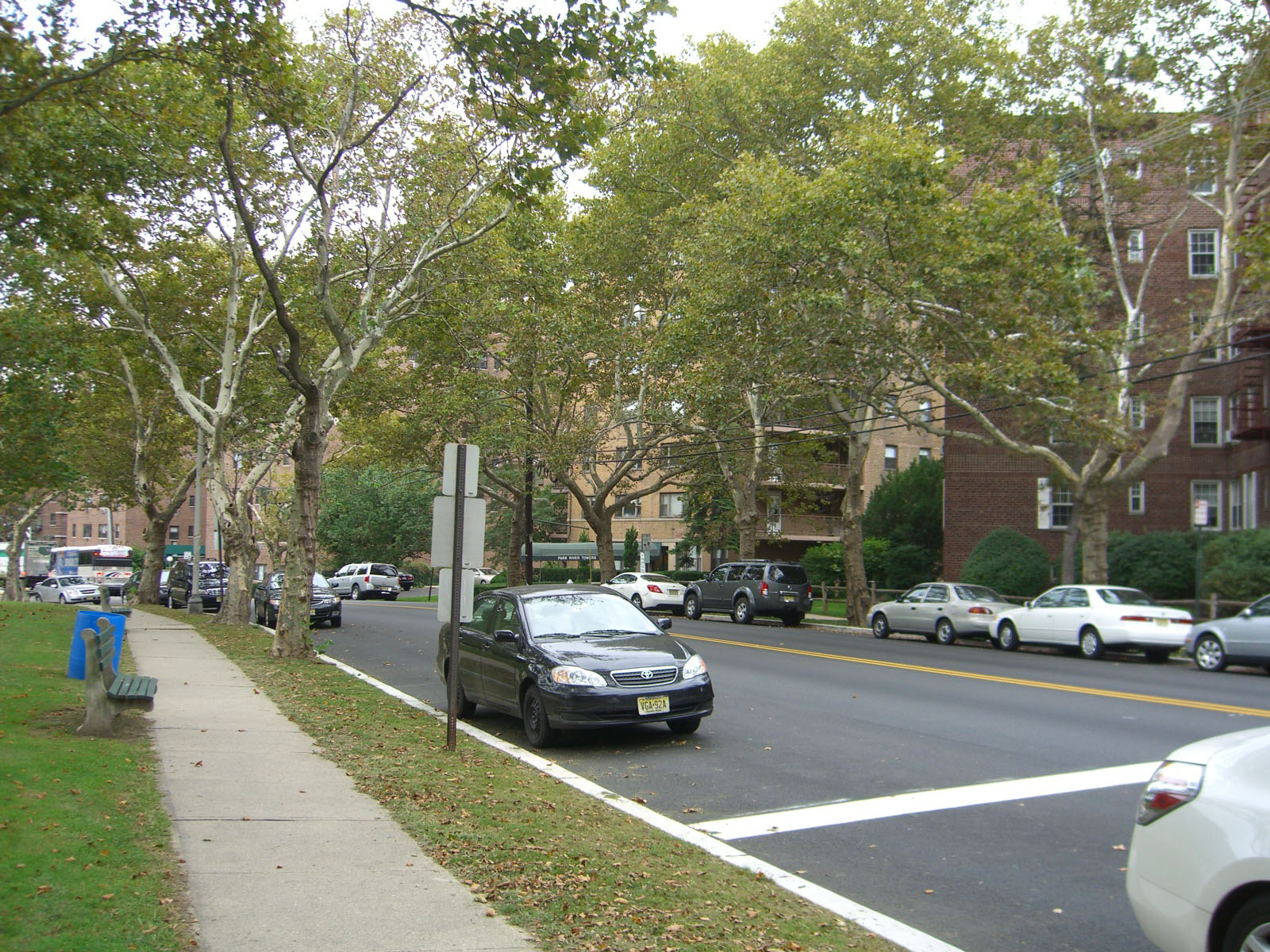
Residences along Boulevard East in Woodcliff.

Woodcliff is a neighborhood in northeastern North Bergen, New Jersey. The center of area is a large Hudson County park known as North Hudson Park, which refers to the collective name of the municipalities in northern part of the county, and is officially named for James J. Braddock, an American boxer who was a resident of the township.

The boomerang-shaped section north of the park is bordered by the southeastern Bergen County towns of Cliffside Park and Fairview, is characterized by a garden apartment complex called Woodcliff Gardens. The neighborhood south of the park is bordered by Boulevard East and Bergenline Avenue, across from which is North Bergen Public Library and the Racetrack Section. It southern border is shared with the borough of Guttenberg. High density housing includes single and multi-family dwellings as well as low-rise and high-rise apartment buildings.

The section was developed early 1900s by the Woodcliff Land Improvement Company, organized by Hamilton V. Meeks in 1891. It is sometimes occasionally still called Hudson Heights. Located atop the Hudson Palisades, much of Woodcliff overlooks the Hudson River and the neighborhoods along its banks, Shadyside and Bulls Ferry, to which it is connected by a colonial era road along the face of the cliff. The Woodcliff Treatment Plant is located at the foot of the escarpment.

Woodcliff is served by New Jersey Transit local and Manhattan-bound buses, as well numerous privately operated carritos, dollar vans and mini-buses originating at Nungesser's, a major intersection.

== See also ==
- WOR TV Tower
- WOR-TV and FM Transmitter in North Bergen, NJ
- Local Landmark
- List of neighborhoods in North Bergen, New Jersey
