= Maisland =

Populated place in Hudson County, New Jersey, US

Coordinates: 40.78718°N 74.03065°W

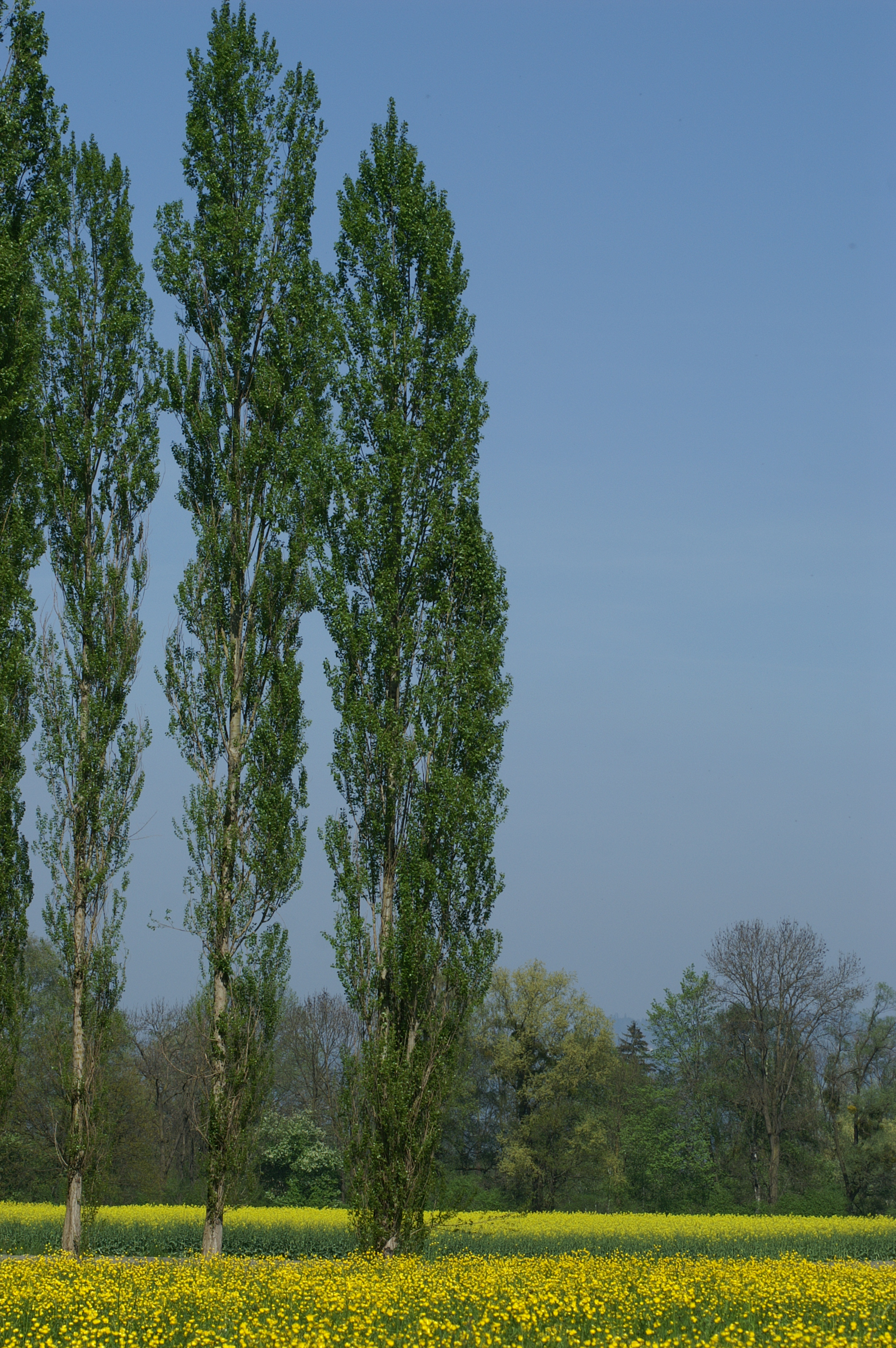
Populus nigra, originating in the United States from plantings by André Michaux at the "Frenchman's Garden" in Maisland.

Maisland, or Mais Land, was an area in Hudson County, New Jersey.

== Location ==
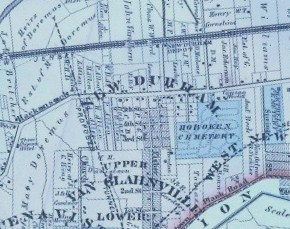
Maisland's approximate location, from an 1873 map of New Durham.

The region of Maisland was located on the western slope of the Hudson Palisades. Under the governorship of Philip Carteret, land in the region of Bergen was sold under the name the "New Mais Land" on May 12, 1668. A Dutch settler named Caspar Stienmets, the judge for court in Bergen, purchased the town lot which amounted to nearly 100 acres (400,000 m^{2}), which included meadowlands and woodlands. The official proceeding allotted the area in the statement:

... between Dunne Hermansen and Hendricke DeBracken. 2 — 17 acres of wood land and meadows next to Capt. Nicholas Verlath; 3 — 16 of woodland; No. 4, Town lot next to Herman Edwartse; No. 5, One lot of Gerrit Gerritsen; No. 6, A town lot, 100 acres in all.

The township of Bergen was divided into several road districts by the freeholders of the Bergen, with the purpose to better regulate the local highway systems. What arose from the annual meeting was the creation of several districts, which remain today somewhat as distinct neighborhoods or cities; some of which were Bergen Woods, Bulls Ferry, Sekakes and Wehauk along with Maisland, and upon the freeholders' decision, an overseer for each district was appointed.

The area, which was one of the most populous sections of the township of Bergen, was referred to as Maisland for 135 years, when in the year 1803, Maisland became known as New Durham, which later on became part of North Bergen, New Jersey. Maisland today constitutes the same area as New Durham did, which is bounded roughly by the beginning of Union Turnpike, Bergen Turnpike, and the Tonnelle Avenue Station of the Hudson Bergen Light Rail. Within its vicinity during Maisland's frame of time was the Three Pigeons Tavern, which stood at the southern fringe of Maisland near the intersection of Tonnelle Avenue and Hackensack Plank Road, and the "Frenchman's Garden". This garden in Maisland, which later became Machpelah Cemetery, was the early source for Lombardy poplar Populus nigra, which spread across the United States.

The name Maisland comes from "Maize Land", where maize is the Native American word for corn.

A trucking company "Maisland Trucking Co." operated in nearby Kearny, New Jersey.

== See also ==
- English Neighborhood
- New Barbadoes Neck
- List of neighborhoods in North Bergen, New Jersey

== Sources ==
- Earle, Isaac Newton (1925). History and genealogy of the Earles of Secaucus: with an account of other English and American branches. Guelff Printing Company. p. 832. OCLC 10641888.
- Eickmann, Walter Theodore (1948). History of West New York, New Jersey: in commemoration of its golden jubilee. West New York. p. 167. OCLC 5882249.
- Hagstrom Map (2008). Hudson County New Jersey Street Map. Hagstrom Map Company, Inc. ISBN 978-0-88097-763-0.
- New Jersey Historical Society (1916). "Proceedings of the New Jersey Historical Society". Proceedings of the New Jersey Historical Society: 256. ISSN 0096-8935. OCLC 2563735.
- New Jersey Historical Society (1949). Documents relating to the colonial, revolutionary and post-revolutionary history of the State of New Jersey. Vol. 21. New Jersey Historical Society. OCLC 10986975.
- Rieser, Robert (1915). Hudson County to-day: Hudson County, New Jersey; its history, people, trades, commerce, institutions and industries. Hudson Dispatch. p. 162. OCLC 35906879.
- Winfield, Charles Hardenburg (1874). History of the county of Hudson, New Jersey: from its earliest settlement to the present time. Kennard & Hay Stationery M'fg and Print. Co. p. 568. OCLC 426912.
