= Bergenwood, North Bergen =

Populated place in Hudson County, New Jersey, US

Coordinates: 40.80965°N 74.00631°W

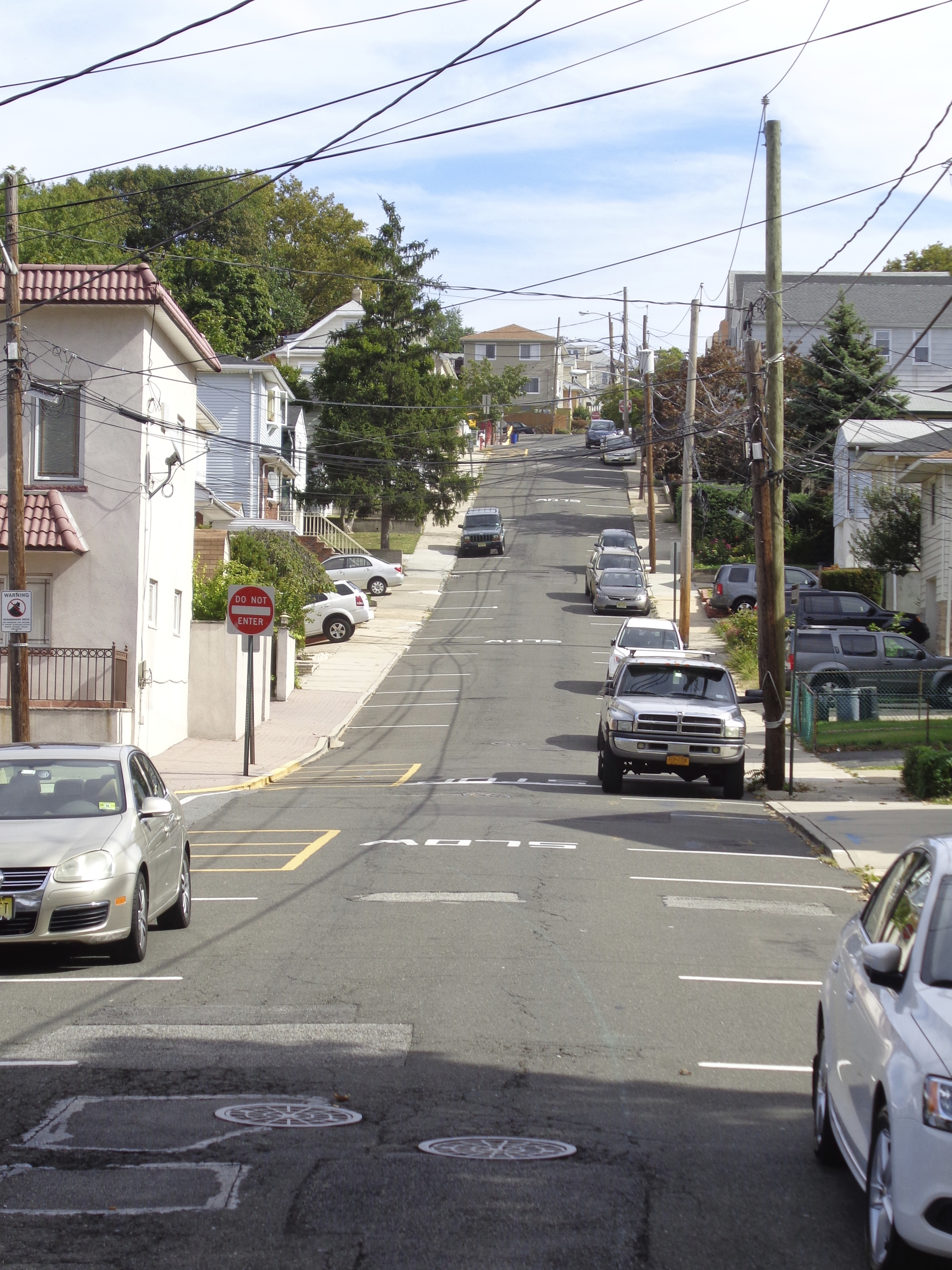
Residential street in Bergenwood

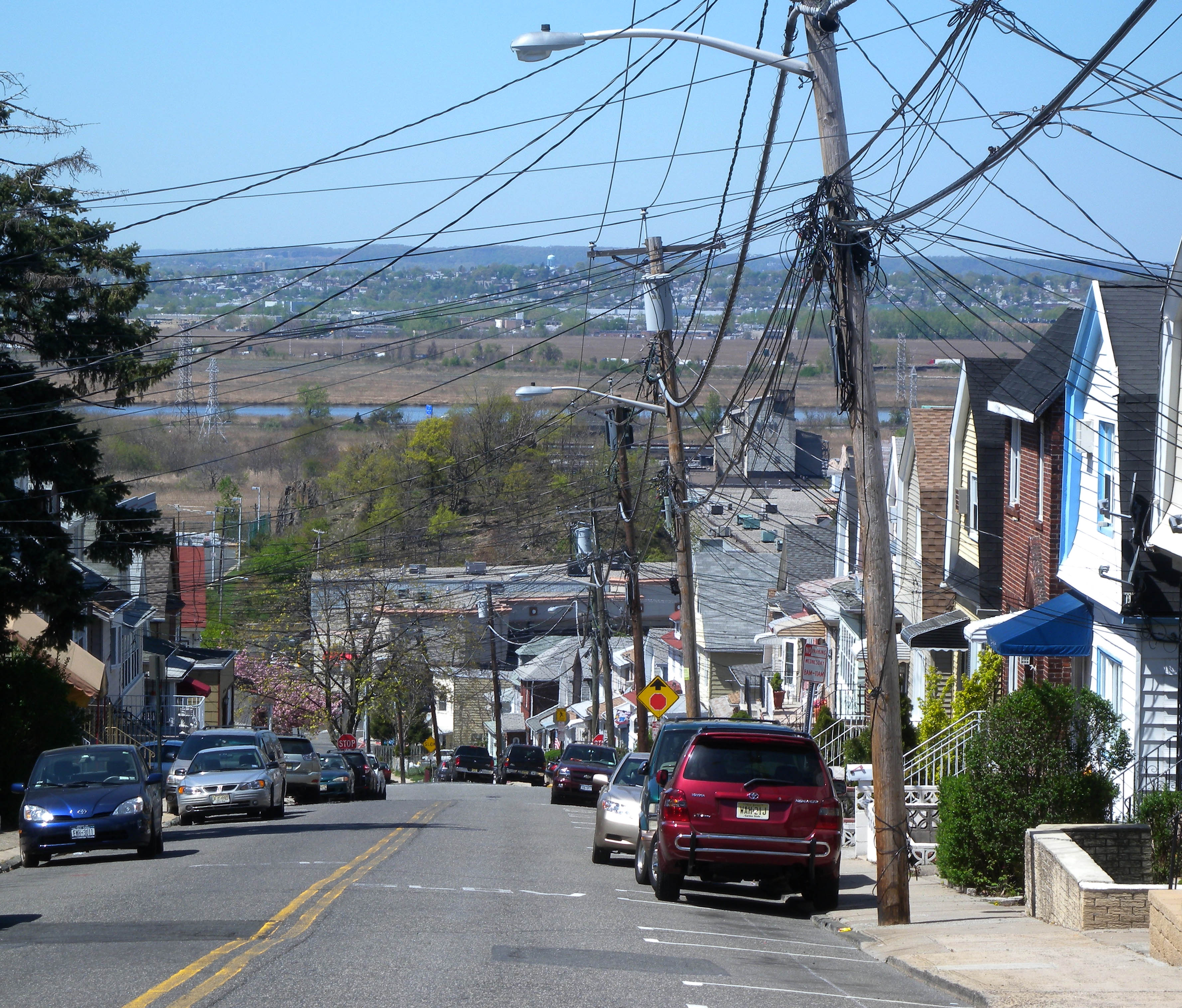
Looking west to the Meadowlands

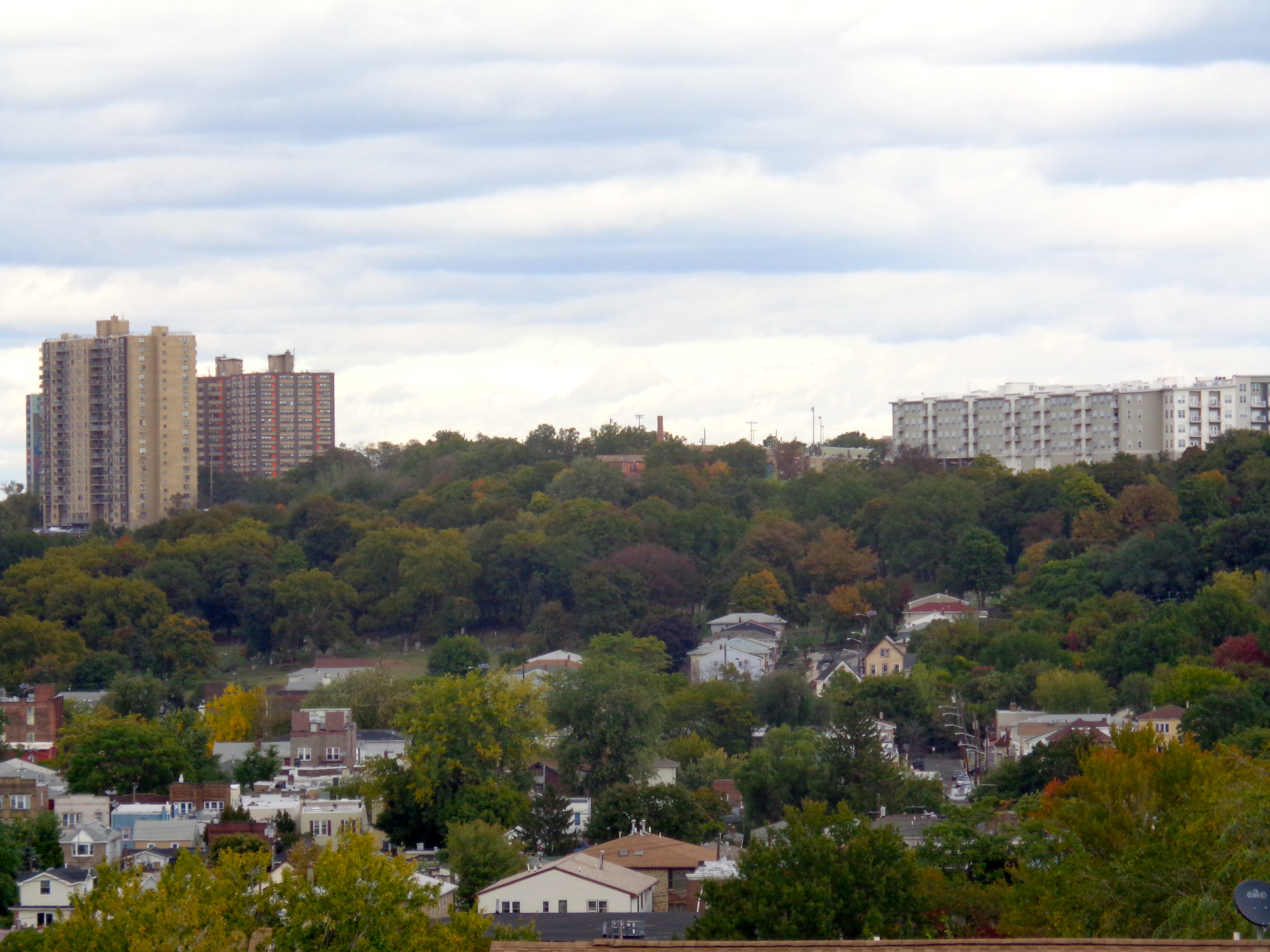
Western slope of North Bergen looking north

Bergenwood is a long narrow district of North Bergen, New Jersey in the northern central part of the township between Kennedy Boulevard and Tonnelle Avenue, characterized by the steep slopes on the west side of the Hudson Palisades as they descend to the New Jersey Meadowlands.

== Topography ==
Bergenwood is the North Bergen district in which the township's distinction of being the U.S. municipality with the second-most hills, behind only San Francisco, is most evident.

The unusual topography also makes for another oddity. The north-south streets in Bergenwood (and on much of the western slope of North Bergen) keep their names (Newkirk, Durham, Liberty, Columbia, and Grand among them) but often do not run contiguously. In some cases they are broken up into seven or eight sections. (Addresses are taken from the numbered east-west streets which more or less follow the urban grid of North Hudson municipalities.)

== Built form ==
Bergenwood is a dense residential area of mostly two-family homes built in the 20th century dotted with small local parks and playgrounds. There are small clusters of highrises overlooking the Meadowlands while on Tonnelle Avenue there are strip malls, motels, and other commercial activity. North Bergen High School is located on Kennedy Boulevard, across from which is the Racetrack Section. High Tech High School (one of Hudson County Schools of Technology) was located at the foot of 85th Street. Bergenwood is separated from Meadowview Section, a neighborhood to its south by three cemeteries: Flower Hill Cemetery, Grove Church Cemetery and Machpelah Cemetery, while its northern border is created by the Fairview Cemetery at the Bergen County line.

== History ==
The name Bergenwood is reminiscent of the American revolutionary and colonial era when much of Jersey City Heights and North Hudson, New Jersey was still a forest known as Bergen Woods. An early land grant was called Maisland. Bergen Wood would remain a part of Bergen County for a number of years to follow. Its residents would pass through the woods between the county's larger towns at Bergen and Hackensack.

== See also ==
- List of neighborhoods in North Bergen, New Jersey
- Granton Junction

== Sources ==
- Hudson County New Jersey Street Map. Hagstrom Map Company, Inc. 2008. ISBN 0-88097-763-9.
