= North Bergen, New Jersey =

Township in Hudson County, New Jersey, US

- Township
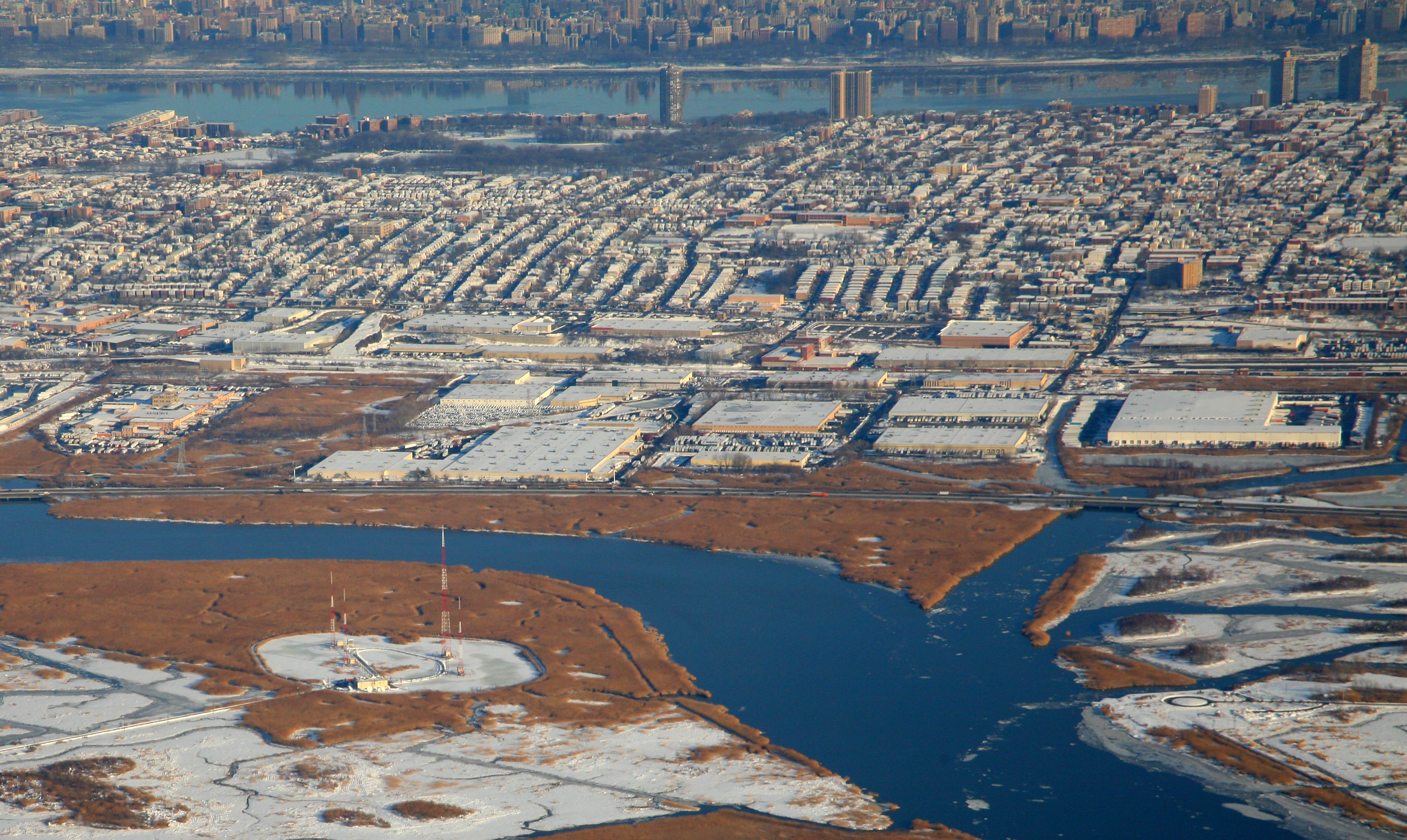
- Eastward from Hackensack River in the Meadowlands to Hudson River

- Seal
- Interactive map of North Bergen, New Jersey
- Location in Hudson County Location in New Jersey Location in the United States
- Coordinates: 40.794163°N 74.024947°W
- Country: United States
- State: New Jersey
- County: Hudson
- Incorporated: April 10, 1843

Government
  - Type: Walsh Act
  - Body: Board of Commissioners
  - Mayor: Hugo Cabrera (term ends May 15, 2027)
  - Municipal clerk: Erin Barillas

Area
  - Total: 5.57 sq mi (14.43 km^{2})
  - Land: 5.14 sq mi (13.30 km^{2})
  - Water: 0.44 sq mi (1.13 km^{2}) 7.83%
  - Rank: 266th of 565 in state 5th of 12 in county
- Elevation: 112 ft (34 m)

Population (2020)
  - Total: 63,361
  - Estimate (2023): 59,394
  - Rank: 23rd of 565 in state 4th of 12 in county
  - Density: 12,336.6/sq mi (4,763.2/km^{2})
  - Rank: 23rd of 565 in state 9th of 12 in county
- Time zone: UTC−05:00 (Eastern (EST))
  - Summer (DST): UTC−04:00 (Eastern (EDT))
- ZIP Code: 07047
- Area code: 201
- FIPS code: 3401752470
- GNIS feature ID: 0882223
- Website: www.northbergen.org

North Bergen is a township in the northern part of Hudson County, in the U.S. state of New Jersey. As of the 2020 United States census, the township's population was 63,361, an increase of 2,588 (+4.3%) from the 2010 census count of 60,773, which in turn reflected an increase of 2,681 (+4.6%) from the 58,092 counted in the 2000 census. The township was incorporated in 1843. It was much diminished in territory by a series of secessions. Situated on the Hudson Palisades, it is one of the hilliest municipalities in the United States. Like neighboring North Hudson communities, North Bergen is among those places in the country with the highest population density.

== History ==
=== Colonial era ===
At the time of European colonization the area was the territory of Hackensack tribe of the Lenape Native Americans, who maintained a settlement, Espatingh, on the west side of the hills and where a Dutch trading post was established after the Peach War. In 1658, Peter Stuyvesant, then Director-General of New Netherland, repurchased from them the area now encompassed by the municipalities of Hudson County east of the Hackensack River. This is commemorated in a New Deal post off mural entitled Purchase of Territory of North Bergen from the Indians. In 1660 Stuyvesant granted permission to establish the semi-autonomous colony of Bergen, with the main village located at today's Bergen Square, considered to be the first chartered municipality in what would become the state of New Jersey. At the time, the area of North Bergen was heavily forested, traversed by paths used by the indigenous and colonizing population and became known as Bergen Woods, a name recalled in today's neighborhood of Bergenwood.

After the 1664 surrender of Fort Amsterdam the entire New Netherland colony came into the possession of the British, who established the Province of New Jersey. In 1682, the East Jersey legislature formed the state's first four counties, including Bergen County, which consisted of all the land in the peninsula between the Hackensack and Hudson Rivers; that is, the eastern portions of what today is Bergen and Hudson Counties. In 1693, Bergen County was divided into two townships: Hackensack Township in the north, and Bergen Township, encompassing the Bergen Neck peninsula, in the south. The border between the two townships is the current Hudson-Bergen county line.

While settlement was sparse, communities developed along the Bergen Turnpike at the Three Pigeons and Maisland, later New Durham. French botanist André Michaux developed his gardens nearby. On the Hudson River, Bulls Ferry became an important landing for crossings to Manhattan. While ostensibly under British control during the American Revolutionary War, the area was patrolled by the Americans on foraging, espionage, and raiding expeditions, most notably the Battle of Bull's Ferry.

=== Toponymy, secession, and urbanization ===
On February 22, 1838, Jersey City was incorporated as a separate municipality, and in 1840 Hudson County, comprising the city and Bergen Township, was created from the southern portion of Bergen County. North Bergen was incorporated as a township on April 10, 1843, by an act of the New Jersey Legislature, from the northern portion of Bergen Township. At the time, the town included everything east of the Hackensack River and north of and including what is now Jersey City Heights.

The entire region that is now known as North Hudson experienced massive immigration and urbanization during the latter half of the 19th century, and led to the creation of various new towns. Portions of the North Bergen were taken to form Hoboken Township (April 9, 1849, now the City of Hoboken), Hudson Town (April 12, 1852, later part of Hudson City), Hudson City (April 11, 1855, later merged with Jersey City), Guttenberg (formed within the township on March 9, 1859, and set off as an independent municipality on April 1, 1878), Weehawken (March 15, 1859), Union Township and West Hoboken Township (both created on February 28, 1861), Union Hill town (March 29, 1864) and Secaucus (March 12, 1900). During this era many of Hudson County's cemeteries were developed along the town's western slope of the Hudson Palisades.

At their foot in the Meadowlands, the Erie, the New York, Susquehanna and Western and the West Shore railroads ran right-of-ways to their terminals on the Hudson, the last building its tunnel through Bergen Hill at North Bergen. The area was important destination during peak German immigration to the United States and is recalled today in Schuetzen Park, founded in 1874. Further north, Nungesser's Guttenberg Racetrack became a notable and notorious destination which, after its closing, became a proving ground for new technologies: the automobile and the airplane.

=== 20th century ===
The development of Hudson County Boulevard, which skirts around the west, north and east of North Bergen, was completed in the early 20th century. By 1913 it was considered to be fine for "motoring". The roadway is now known by its two sections: Kennedy Boulevard and Boulevard East.

Residential districts along and between the two boulevards were developed. Bergenline Avenue, a broad street which accommodated the North Hudson County Railway streetcars to Nungesser's became (and remains) an important commercial and transit corridor. The two boulevard sections met at Bergenline Avenue, at the northwest corner of North Hudson/Braddock Park.

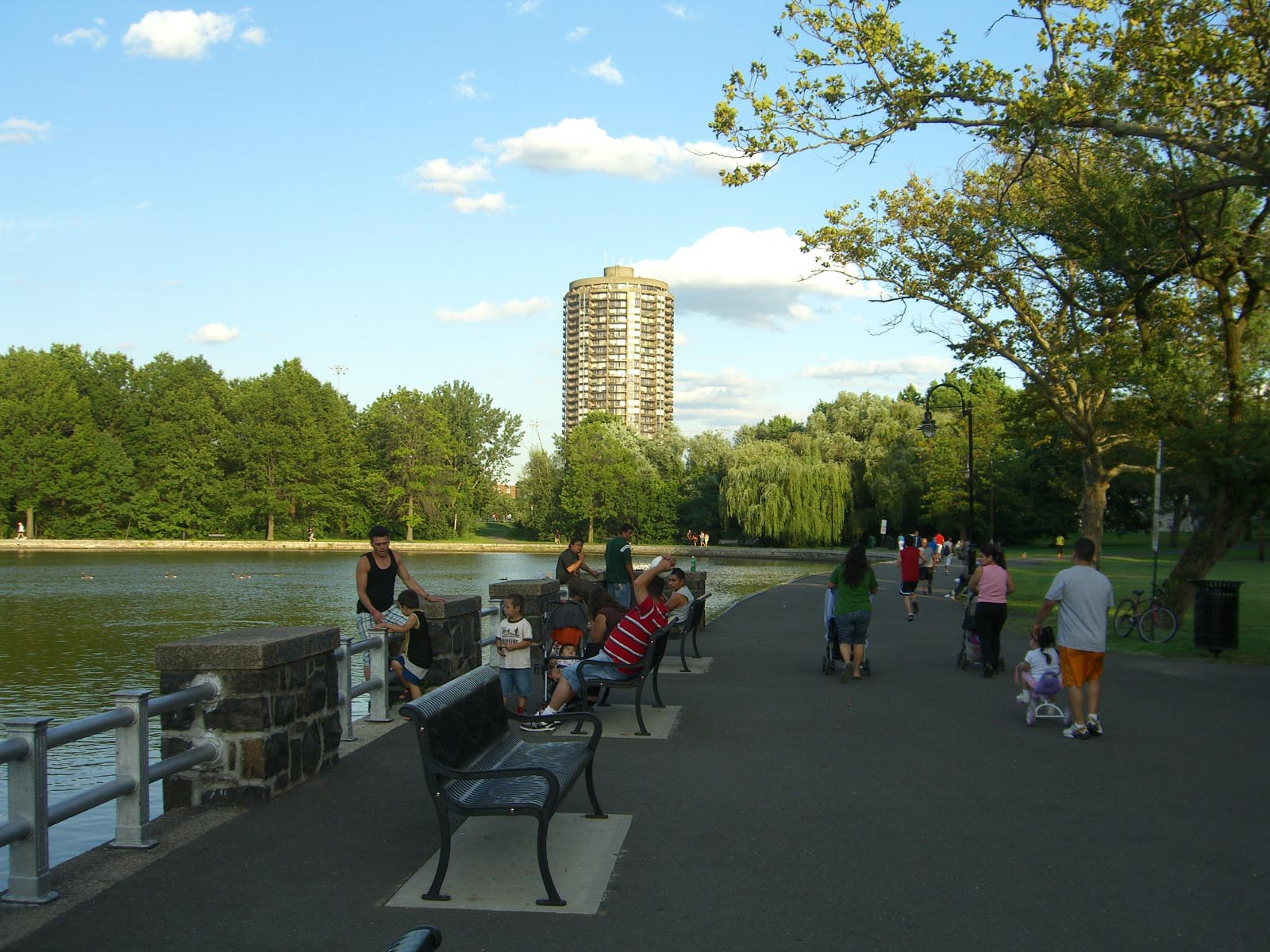
James J. Braddock North Hudson County Park and the Stonehenge

Soon after the opening of the Lincoln Tunnel Approach, the Susquehanna Transfer was opened in August 1939 to accommodate passengers who wished to transfer to buses through the tunnel to the Port Authority Bus Terminal. It closed in 1966.

At the time of its construction in 1949, the 760-foot (230 m) WOR TV Tower, in the midst of the residential Woodcliff Section, was the tenth-tallest man-made structure in the world. The tower was dismantled in 1956 but in 1967, about half a mile (2500 m) to the east, the 34-story, 369-foot (112 m) Stonehenge apartment building was constructed on the tip of the Palisades.

In the early 1960s two notable paleontological finds of fossils from the Newark Basin were made near the foot of the cliffs at one of several former quarries, the Granton, of which today's avenue is a namesake. The former quarry remained an archaeological site until at least 1980.

North Hudson Park was renamed the James J. Braddock North Hudson County Park. In 1935, while living in North Bergen, local hero James J. Braddock won the world heavyweight championship in one of the most stunning upsets in boxing history.

In contrast to other Hudson County communities during the latter half of the century, North Bergen grew significantly in population. Many residents are part of the wave of Spanish language speakers which had begun in the 1960s with Cuban émigrés, leading to the nickname, Havana on the Hudson.

== Geography ==
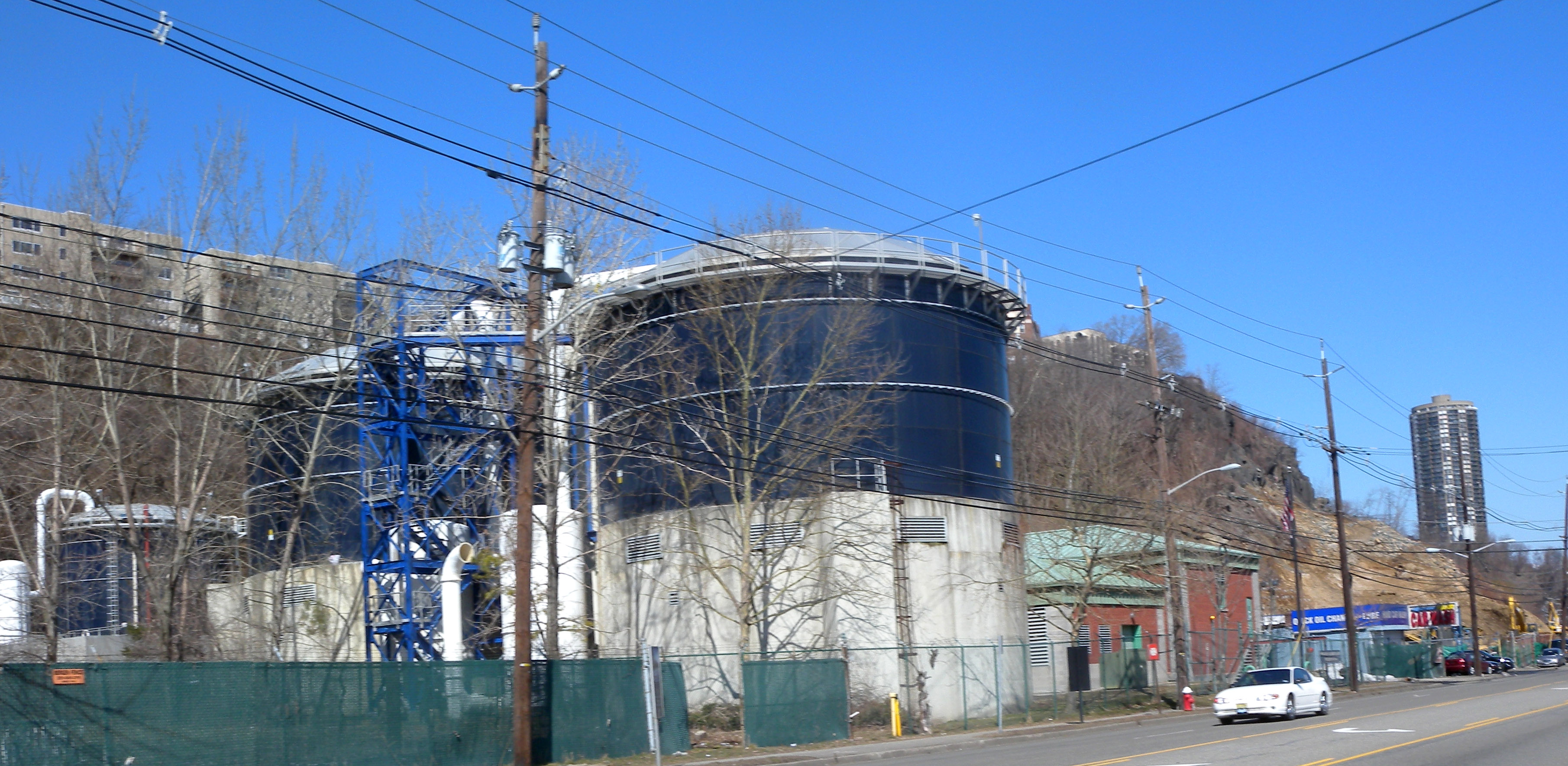
Woodcliff Treatment Plant at the foot of the Palisades. In the distance, off to the right, is the Stonehenge Building rising from the Palisades.

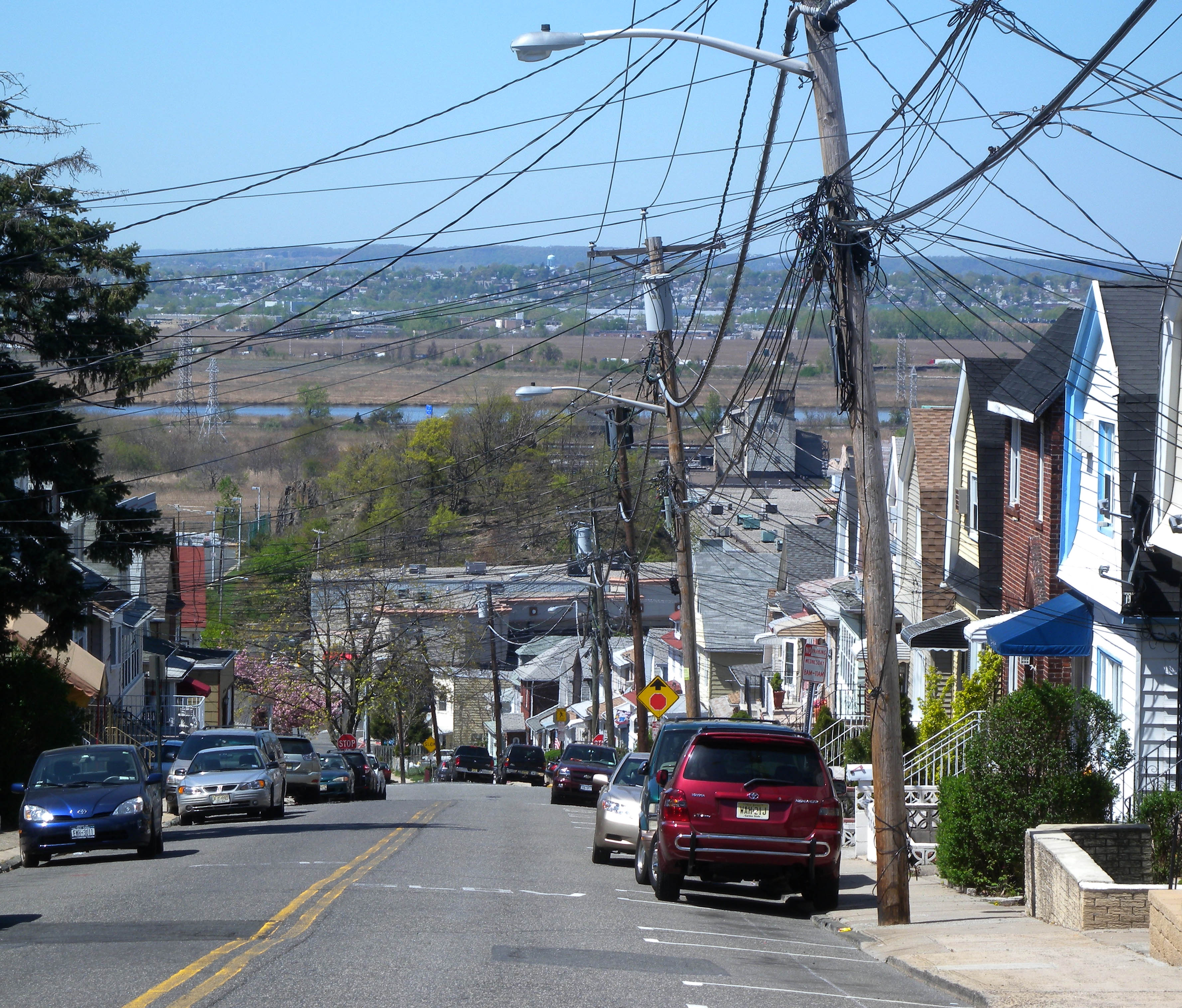
On the western slope overlooking the Meadowlands

In 1850, the township was roughly rectangular. When the municipalities along the Hudson River (what are now Guttenberg, West New York, Union City and Weehawken) broke away, it left North Bergen roughly an inverted "L", or "axe-shaped". Its northern section stretches east–west and is south of the Bergen County communities of Cliffside Park, Edgewater, Fairview and Ridgefield. To the east, the Hudson River creates the shared border with the borough of Manhattan in New York City. It shares a border with Carlstadt in the Hackensack River. Its north–south section lies between Secaucus to the west and to the east Guttenberg, West New York and Union City, with which it meets Jersey City at a single point at its southern end. According to the United States Census Bureau, the township had a total area of 5.57 square miles (14.43 km^{2}), including 5.14 square miles (13.30 km^{2}) of land and 0.44 square miles (1.13 km^{2}) of water (7.83%).

North Bergen has diverse geological features. Partially situated on the Hudson River, the Hudson Palisades rise from the waterfront, while the northern part of the town sits atop the plateau. The cuesta, or slope, on its west side makes North Bergen the city with the second-most hills per square mile in the United States after San Francisco, some of which are extremely steep. A rock formation along the slope (located at 40°48′27″N 74°01′05″W) is made up of unusual serpentinite rock and made up of small rock cliffs. Because of this, it is one of the few undeveloped parts of North Bergen. Low-lying areas along the west side are part of the New Jersey Meadowlands. The unusual shape and diverse topography of North Bergen have created diverse historical and contemporary neighborhoods:

- Bergenline Avenue runs to Nungessers at the Fairview border near North Hudson Park. It has been described as the longest commercial avenue in the state, with over 300 retail stores and restaurants.
- The Racetrack section, between Bergenline and Kennedy Boulevard on the plateau.
- Bergenwood, on the steep slopes of the west side of the Palisades.
- New Durham, site of colonial American Three Pigeons near the Bergen Turnpike and Tonnelle Avenue.
- Meadowview, behind the Municipal Building between the many cemeteries.
- Bulls Ferry, on the Hudson waterfront, site of Roc Harbor, Palisades Medical Center and the Hudson River Waterfront Walkway
- Babbitt, in the Meadowlands district, a part of which is a wetlands preserve known as the Eastern Brackish Marsh.
- Woodcliff on The Palisades around the North Hudson Park.
- Transfer Station near the tripoint with Union City and Jersey City near Paterson Plank Road, Kennedy Boulevard, and Secaucus Road in Secaucus.

Other historical unincorporated communities, localities and place names located partially or completely within the township include Homestead, Granton, Hudson Heights, New Durham, Shadyside, Three Pigeons and Tyler Park.

The town has seven cemeteries, more than any other town in the county, including some, such as Weehawken Cemetery and Hoboken Cemetery, that were at one time designated for other towns. This may be due to the layout of the county in the late 19th and early 20th centuries, with North Bergen having more land than its more densely populated neighbors, which had to bury their dead outside of town. It may also date back to the Civil War era. Among these cemeteries are Flower Hill Cemetery and Grove Church Cemetery.

== Demographics ==
Historical population
Census	Pop.	Note	%±
1850	3,578	*	—
1860	6,335	*	77.1%
1870	3,032	*	−52.1%
1880	4,268		40.8%
1890	5,715		33.9%
1900	9,213	*	61.2%
1910	15,662		70.0%
1920	23,344		49.0%
1930	40,714		74.4%
1940	39,714		−2.5%
1950	41,560		4.6%
1960	42,387		2.0%
1970	47,751		12.7%
1980	47,019		−1.5%
1990	48,414		3.0%
2000	58,092		20.0%
2010	60,773		4.6%
2020	63,361		4.3%
2023 (est.)	59,394		−6.3%
Population sources: 1850–1920; 1850–1870 1850 1870; 1880–1890 1890–1910; 1910–1930 1940–2000; 2000 2010 2020 * = Lost territory in previous decade.

=== 2020 census ===
North Bergen township, Hudson County, New Jersey – Racial and ethnic composition Note: the US Census treats Hispanic/Latino as an ethnic category. This table excludes Latinos from the racial categories and assigns them to a separate category. Hispanics/Latinos may be of any race.
Race / Ethnicity (NH = Non-Hispanic)	Pop 1990	Pop 2000	Pop 2010	Pop 2020	% 1990	% 2000	% 2010	% 2020
White alone (NH)	25,536	18,427	13,370	11,235	52.75%	31.72%	22.00%	17.73%
Black or African American alone (NH)	505	900	1,065	1,403	1.04%	1.55%	1.75%	2.21%
Native American or Alaska Native alone (NH)	56	68	62	70	0.12%	0.12%	0.10%	0.11%
Asian alone (NH)	2,191	3,711	3,835	4,269	4.53%	6.39%	6.31%	6.74%
Native Hawaiian or Pacific Islander alone (NH)	N/A	11	18	14	N/A	0.02%	0.03%	0.02%
Other race alone (NH)	189	244	231	612	0.39%	0.42%	0.38%	0.97%
Mixed race or Multiracial (NH)	N/A	1,471	623	858	N/A	2.53%	1.03%	1.35%
Hispanic or Latino (any race)	19,937	33,260	41,569	44,900	41.18%	57.25%	68.40%	70.86%
Total	48,414	58,092	60,773	63,361	100.00%	100.00%	100.00%	100.00%

=== 2010 census ===
The 2010 United States census counted 60,773 people, 22,062 households, and 14,539 families in the township. The population density was 11,838.0 per square mile (4,570.7/km^{2}). There were 23,912 housing units at an average density of 4,657.8 per square mile (1,798.4/km^{2}). The racial makeup was 66.98% (40,705) White, 4.04% (2,456) Black or African American, 0.88% (535) Native American, 6.55% (3,979) Asian, 0.08% (49) Pacific Islander, 16.63% (10,107) from other races, and 4.84% (2,942) from two or more races. Hispanic or Latino of any race were 68.40% (41,569) of the population.

Of the 22,062 households, 30.3% had children under the age of 18; 42.7% were married couples living together; 16.2% had a female householder with no husband present and 34.1% were non-families. Of all households, 28.4% were made up of individuals and 10.8% had someone living alone who was 65 years of age or older. The average household size was 2.73 and the average family size was 3.35.

21.5% of the population were under the age of 18, 9.5% from 18 to 24, 30.3% from 25 to 44, 25.2% from 45 to 64, and 13.5% who were 65 years of age or older. The median age was 37.1 years. For every 100 females, the population had 94.4 males. For every 100 females ages 18 and older there were 91.3 males.

=== 2000 census ===
As of the 2000 United States census there were 58,092 people, 21,236 households, and 14,249 families residing in the township. The population density was 11,179.6 inhabitants per square mile (4,316.5/km^{2}). There were 22,009 housing units at an average density of 1, 634.2/km^{2} (4,235.5/sq mi). The racial makeup of the township was 67.36% White, 2.72% African American, 0.40% Native American, 6.47% Asian, 0.05% Pacific Islander, 15.53% from other races, and 7.47% from two or more races. Hispanic or Latino of any race were 57.25% of the population.

There were 21,236 households, out of which 32.0% had children under the age of 18 living with them, 47.4% were married couples living together, 14.2% had a female householder with no husband present, and 32.9% were non-families. 27.7% of all households were made up of individuals, and 11.2% had someone living alone who was 65 years of age or older. The average household size was 2.70 and the average family size was 3.33.

In the township the population was spread out, with 22.7% under the age of 18, 9.0% from 18 to 24, 33.1% from 25 to 44, 21.4% from 45 to 64, and 13.8% who were 65 years of age or older. The median age was 36 years. For every 100 females, there were 91.5 males. For every 100 females age 18 and over, there were 87.7 males.

Males had a median income of $35,626 versus $29,067 for females. The per capita income for the township was $20,058. About 9.6% of families and 11.1% of the population were below the poverty line, including 14.0% of those under age 18 and 14.5% of those age 65 or over.

== Economy ==
North Bergen has several retail districts, along Bergenline Avenue, Tonnelle Avenue, and near Transfer Station. Portions of the city are part of an Urban Enterprise Zone (UEZ), one of 32 zones covering 37 municipalities statewide. Union City was selected in 1996 as one of a group of seven zones added to participate in the program. In addition to other benefits to encourage employment and investment within the UEZ, shoppers can take advantage of a reduced 3.3125% sales tax rate (half of the 6 5/8% rate charged statewide) at eligible merchants. Established in April 1995, the city's Urban Enterprise Zone status expires in April 2026. The zone was established based on legislation passed in February 1995 through the efforts of Senator Sacco, one of the sponsors of legislation creating the zones.

Hudson News and Liz Claiborne are large employers. New York, Susquehanna and Western Railway operates five intermodal freight transport facilities within the township.

== Government ==
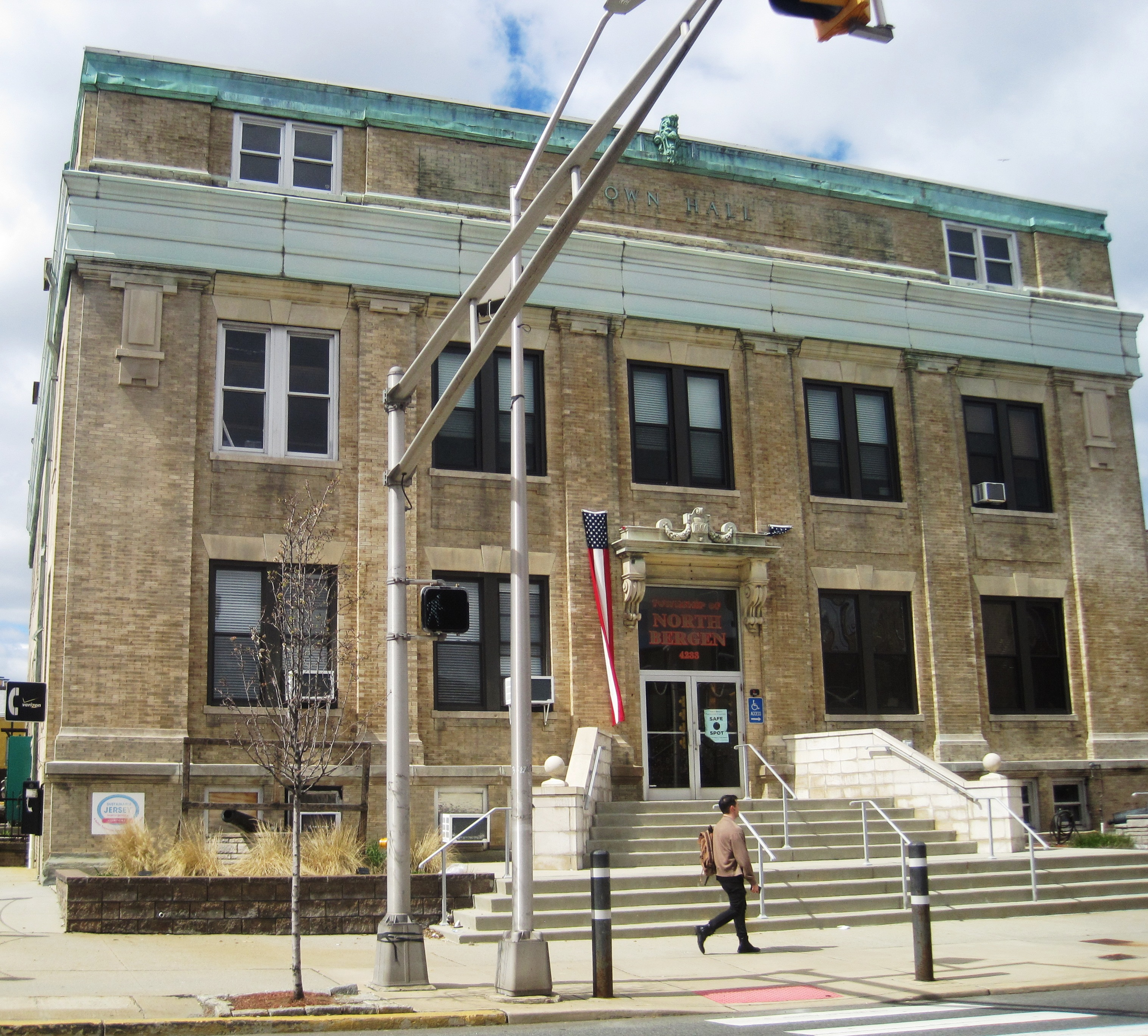
North Bergen Town Hall

=== Local government ===
North Bergen has been governed under the Walsh Act form of New Jersey municipal government since 1931. The township is one of 30 municipalities (of the 564) statewide that use the form of government. The governing body is comprised of five commissioners elected at-large to the Township Committee in non-partisan elections to serve four-year terms of office on a concurrent basis. After each election, each individual is assigned to head one of the five commissions and the commissioners select one of their members to serve as mayor.

As of 2023, members of the North Bergen Township Committee are Mayor Nicholas Sacco (Commissioner of Public Affairs), Hugo D. Cabrera (Commissioner of Parks and Public Property), Frank Gargiulo (Commissioner of Public Works), Julio Marenco (Commissioner of Revenue and Finance), and Allen Pascual (Commissioner of Public Safety), all serving concurrent terms of office ending in May 2027.

After serving for 35 years, on October 8, 2026, Mayor Nick Sacco announced he was stepping down and would be endorsing Hugo Cabrera to replace him. Cabrera said he would endorse Sacco's son Nick jr. to fill his seat.

=== Corruption ===
After serving as Township Clerk from 1971 to 1979, Joseph Mocco was arrested on August 7, 1986, on charges of illegally dumping tons of construction material within North Bergen and other nearby communities. Mocco was convicted and began serving a prison sentence in July 1995. Mocco was paroled in 1999, with several special conditions imposed on him upon his release by the New Jersey State Parole Board designed to prohibit him from working or participating in local elections.

In February 2004, Peter Perez, former commissioner in charge of Parks and Recreation, was sentenced to serve six months in a federal prison for accepting kickbacks and bribes from a contractor who had several business contracts with the township. He received a reduced sentence in light of his cooperation with authorities.

On March 27, 2008, North Bergen Athletic Director Jerry Maietta and Guidance Counselor Ralph Marino were among 45 men swept up in a Bergen County raid. Bergen County prosecutors described the two as lower level operatives in an expansive network of bookies, package holders, drug dealers and drug distributors. Other transactions included knock-off women's purses and human organs.

On September 11, 2012, North Bergen's Superintendent of the Department of Public Works James Wiley pleaded guilty to one count of second degree conspiracy to commit official misconduct. Wiley was convicted for using the town's resources to participate in political campaigns. In November 2015, two DPW supervisors were sentenced to five years in prison following their convictions on charges that they had directed department workers to work on political campaigns and perform work on behalf of supervisors and other officials.

A 2013 report issued by the office of the New Jersey State Comptroller stated that an attorney had been hired by the township between 1988 and 1990 for a no-show job for which he had been paid an annual salary of $18,800 plus benefits. While an employee of the township, the attorney said that he had been pressured to contribute to the mayor and other individuals affiliated with the mayor. His employment was terminated in 2006 after a disagreement with his political patrons.

=== Federal, state and county representation ===
North Bergen is located in the 8th Congressional District and is part of New Jersey's 33rd state legislative district.

For the 119th United States Congress, New Jersey's 8th congressional district is represented by Rob Menendez (D, Jersey City). New Jersey is represented in the United States Senate by Democrats Cory Booker (Newark, term ends 2027) and Andy Kim (Moorestown, term ends 2031).

For the 2026–2027 session, the 33rd legislative district of the New Jersey Legislature is represented in the State Senate by Brian P. Stack (D, Union City) and in the General Assembly by Gabe Rodriguez (D, West New York) and Larry Wainstein (D, North Bergen).

Hudson County is governed by the directly elected Hudson County Executive and by a Board of County Commissioners, which serves as the county's legislative body. As of 2025, Hudson County's Hudson County Executive is Craig Guy (D, Jersey City), whose term of office expires December 31, 2027. Hudson County's Commissioners are Kenneth Kopacz (D, District 1 - Bayonne and parts of Jersey City; 2026, Bayonne), William O'Dea (D, District 2 - Western Jersey City; 2026, Jersey City), Vice Chair Jerry Walker (D, District 3 - South Eastern Jersey City Yraida Aponte-Lipski (D, District 4 - North Eastern Jersey City; 2026, Jersey City), Chair Anthony L. Romano Jr. (D, District 5 - Hoboken and parts of Jersey City; 2026, Hoboken), Fanny J. Cedeño (D, District 6 - Union City; 2026, Union City), Caridad Rodriguez (D, District 7 - Weehawken, West New York, and Gutenberg; 2026, West New York), Robert Bascelice (D, District 8 - West New York, North Bergen, Secaucus; 2026, North Bergen) and Albert J. Cifelli (D, District 9 - Secaucus, Kearny, East Newark, Harrison; 2026, Harrison)

Hudson County's constitutional officers are County Clerk E. Junior Maldonado (D, Jersey City, 2027), Register Jeffrey Dublin (D, Jersey City, 2026) Sheriff Frank X. Schillari (R, Jersey City, 2025) and Surrogate Tilo E. Rivas (D, Jersey City, 2029)

=== Politics ===
As of March 2011, there were a total of 30,595 registered voters in North Bergen, of which 18,816 (61.5%) were registered as Democrats, 2,462 (8.0%) were registered as Republicans and 9,301 (30.4%) were registered as Unaffiliated. There were 16 voters registered to other parties.

Gubernatorial election results for North Bergen
Year	Republican		Democratic		Third party(ies)	
Year	No.	%	No.	%	No.	%
2025	4,950	32.02%	10,399	67.28%	108	0.70%
2021	2,999	27.13%	7,996	72.33%	60	0.54%
2017	1,670	15.40%	9,050	83.46%	124	1.14%
2013	4,296	38.20%	6,802	60.49%	147	1.31%
2009	2,922	22.56%	9,680	74.73%	351	2.71%
2005	2,687	20.38%	10,267	77.88%	229	1.74%

In the 2012 presidential election, Democrat Barack Obama received 78.1% of the vote (15,600 cast), ahead of Republican Mitt Romney with 21.1% (4,209 votes), and other candidates with 0.8% (164 votes), among the 20,134 ballots cast by the township's 32,627 registered voters (161 ballots were spoiled), for a turnout of 61.7%. In the 2008 presidential election, Democrat Barack Obama received 69.6% of the vote here (14,791 cast), ahead of Republican John McCain with 28.7% (6,100 votes) and other candidates with 0.8% (169 votes), among the 21,254 ballots cast by the town's 34,402 registered voters, for a turnout of 61.8%. In the 2004 presidential election, Democrat John Kerry received 65.4% of the vote here (12,783 ballots cast), outpolling Republican George W. Bush with 33.5% (6,541 votes) and other candidates with 0.4% (118 votes), among the 19,540 ballots cast by the town's 30,540 registered voters, for a turnout percentage of 64.0.

Presidential Elections Results
Year	Republican	Democratic	Third Parties
2024	45.0% 9,402	51.4% 10,734	3.6% 690
2020	31.8% 7,484	65.7% 15,456	2.5% 179
2016	24.2% 5,010	73.0% 15,140	2.5% 215
2012	21.1% 4,209	78.1% 15,600	0.8% 164
2008	28.7% 6,100	69.6% 14,791	0.8% 169
2004	33.5% 6,541	65.4% 12,783	0.4% 118

In the 2013 gubernatorial election, Democrat Barbara Buono received 60.5% of the vote (6,802 cast), ahead of Republican Chris Christie with 38.2% (4,296 votes), and other candidates with 1.3% (147 votes), among the 11,704 ballots cast by the township's 33,134 registered voters (459 ballots were spoiled), for a turnout of 35.3%. In the 2009 gubernatorial election, Democrat Jon Corzine received 73.9% of the vote here (9,680 ballots cast), ahead of Republican Chris Christie with 22.3% (2,922 votes), Independent Chris Daggett with 1.5% (200 votes) and other candidates with 1.2% (151 votes), among the 13,106 ballots cast by the town's 28,555 registered voters, yielding a 45.9% turnout.

United States Senate election results for North Bergen1
Year	Republican		Democratic		Third party(ies)	
Year	No.	%	No.	%	No.	%
2024	7,510	40.33%	10,338	55.51%	774	4.16%
2018	3,448	20.61%	12,903	77.11%	382	2.28%
2012	3,196	17.17%	15,187	81.58%	234	1.26%
2006	2,800	20.23%	10,926	78.96%	112	0.81%

United States Senate election results for North Bergen2
Year	Republican		Democratic		Third party(ies)	
Year	No.	%	No.	%	No.	%
2020	6,179	27.81%	15,413	69.37%	626	2.82%
2014	1,879	17.49%	8,509	79.21%	354	3.30%
2013	1,411	18.32%	6,183	80.30%	106	1.38%
2008	4,458	24.20%	13,646	74.08%	316	1.72%

== Public safety ==
The North Bergen Police Force was founded in 1923, replacing the peace force known as "roundsmen", who began patrolling the township at night in 1907. The North Bergen Police Department attracted negative publicity in 2025 after a series of alleged "pranks" by its police chief, which included defecating on the floor, spiking a coffee pot with prescription drugs, and inserting a hypodermic needle into an officer's penis. The chief and his predecessors also allegedly pressured officers into writing more parking tickets in order to raise money for the township.

North Bergen's fire department merged with those of the neighboring communities of Guttenberg, Union City, West New York and Weehawken in 1999 to form North Hudson Regional Fire and Rescue (NHRFR). Engine 1, Engine 6, Engine 9 / Battalion 3, Engine 13 and Ladder 5 are all located in North Bergen.

NHRFR and North Bergen Emergency Medical Services (headquartered at 63rd Street and Granton Avenue) were among the many Hudson County agencies that responded to the January 2009 crash of Flight 1549, as did Palisades Medical Center, where 57 of the survivors were treated for injuries.

== Education ==
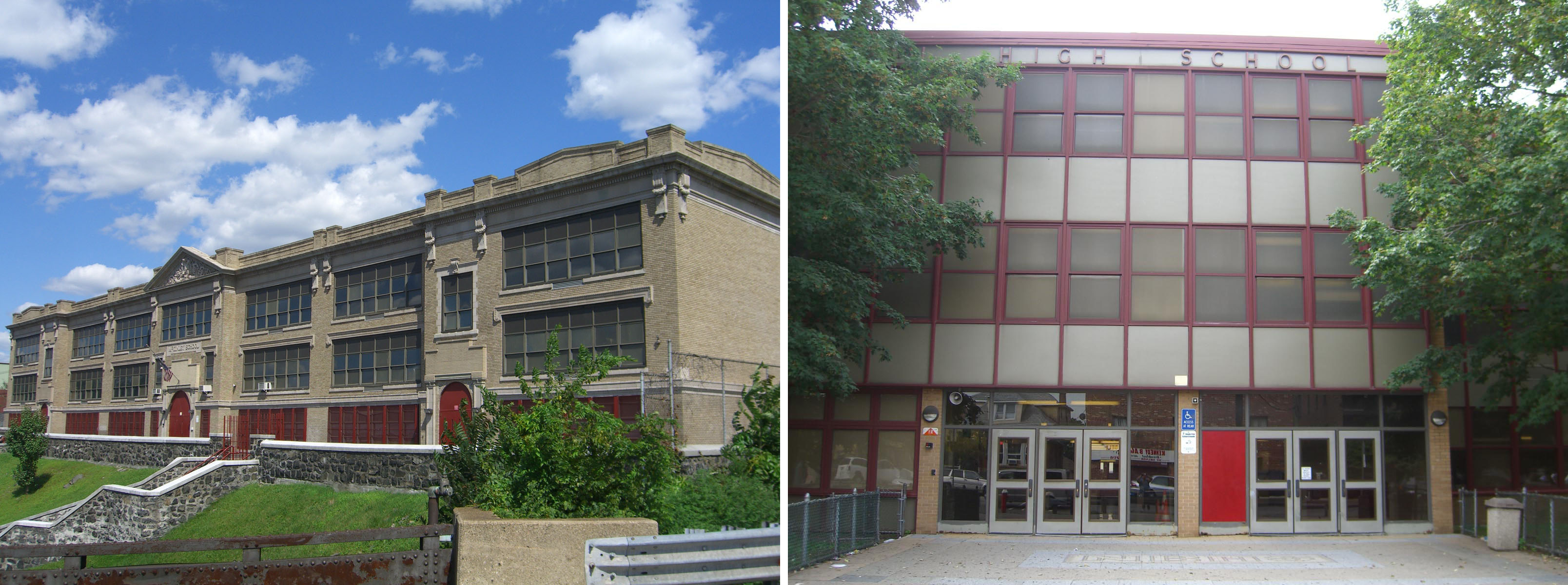
McKinley School (left) and North Bergen High School (right)

The North Bergen School District serves students in pre-kindergarten through twelfth grade. As of the 2023–24 school year, the district, comprised of eight schools, had an enrollment of 7,165 students and 553.4 classroom teachers (on an FTE basis), for a student–teacher ratio of 13.0:1. Schools in the district (with 2023–24 enrollment data from the National Center for Education Statistics) are Franklin Elementary School (524 students; in grades 1–8), Robert Fulton Elementary School (885; K-8), John F. Kennedy Elementary School (566; 1–8), Lincoln Elementary School (1,209; PreK–8), Horace Mann Elementary School (968; 1–8), McKinley Elementary School (320; K–8), Polk Street Elementary School (258; K–8) and North Bergen High School (2,384; 9–12). Students from Guttenberg attend the district's high school as part of a sending/receiving relationship with the Guttenberg Public School District.

North Bergen had been the location of High Tech High School, a county magnet school for ninth through twelfth grades. The Hudson County Schools of Technology constructed a new site for the school in Secaucus at a cost of $160 million, which opened for the 2018–19 school year. The former High Tech High School campus was acquired by the North Bergen district, which plans to construct a new junior high school for grades 7–9 on the site.

A Step Ahead Preschool is a private pre-K through kindergarten school established in 1993.

== Transportation ==
=== Roads and highways ===
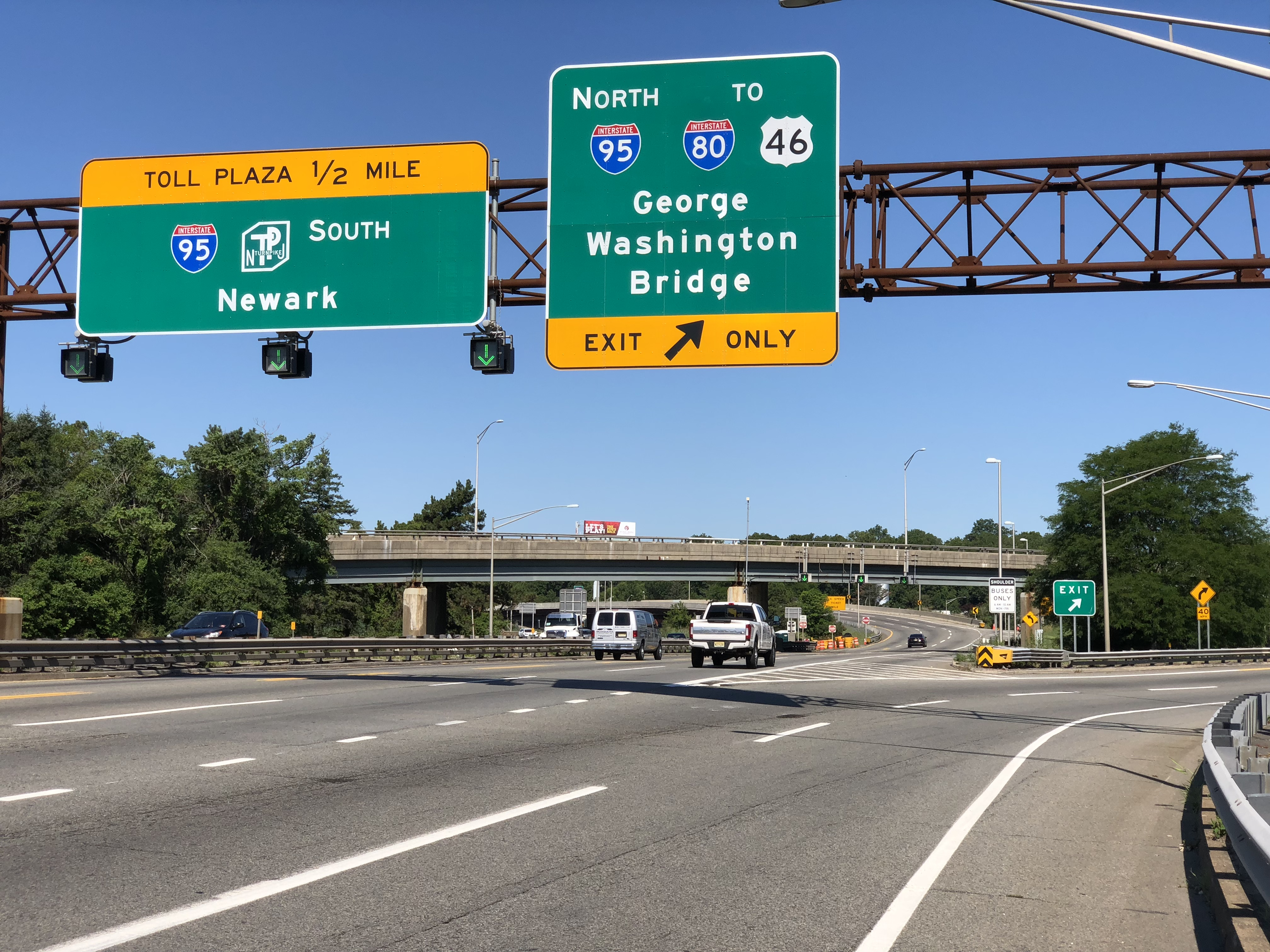
Westbound Route 495 at the New Jersey Turnpike (I-95) in North Bergen

As of May 2010, the township had a total of 64.74 miles (104.19 km) of roadways, of which 50.00 miles (80.47 km) were maintained by the municipality, 7.85 miles (12.63 km) by Hudson County, 5.49 miles (8.84 km) by the New Jersey Department of Transportation and 1.40 miles (2.25 km) by the New Jersey Turnpike Authority.

Several major roadways traverse North Bergen. Route 495 travels between the Lincoln Tunnel and the New Jersey Turnpike (Interstate 95), with interchanges for Route 3 and U.S. Route 1/9, which runs north–south on the western edge side of the township. County Route 501 (Kennedy Boulevard) and County Route 505 (River Road) pass through on the eastern side of the township.

=== Public transportation ===
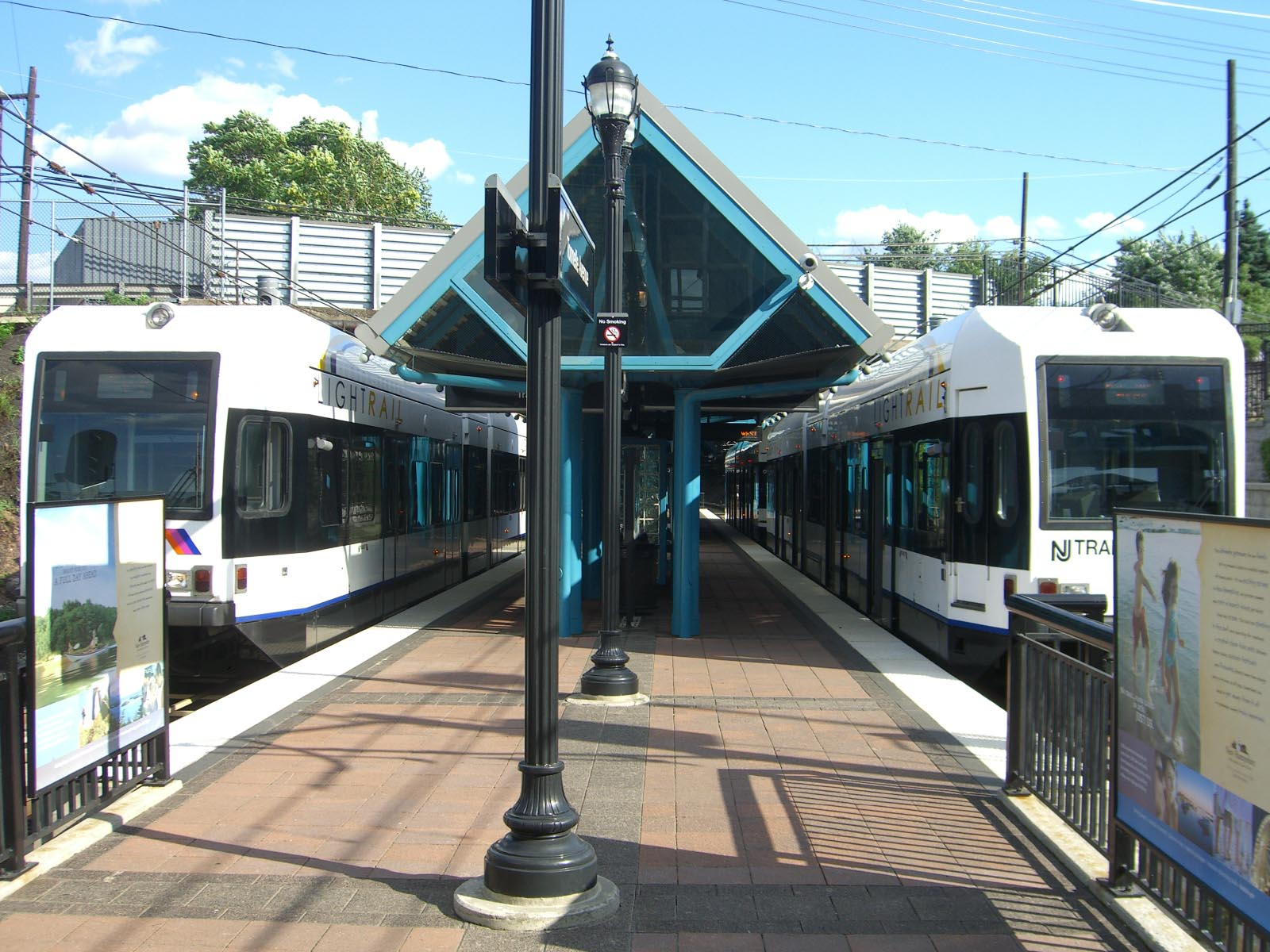
The Tonnelle Avenue Light Rail station

Public transportation in North Bergen is provided by bus and light rail service. Hudson-Bergen Light Rail (HBLR) service is available at the Tonnelle Avenue station and Bergenline Avenue station (in Union City) to points in Weehawken, Hoboken, Jersey City and Bayonne.

Bus service is provided along busy north–south corridors on Kennedy Boulevard, Bergenline Avenue, and Boulevard East by NJ Transit and privately operated dollar vans within Hudson County, and to Bergen and Manhattan, New York City. Nungessers is a major origination and transfer point. Lines terminating at Port Authority Bus Terminal in Midtown Manhattan are the 121, 125, 127, 128, 154, 156, 158, 159, 165, 166, 168, 320 routes. The 181 and 188 lines terminate at George Washington Bridge Bus Terminal in Upper Manhattan. Lines 22, 23, 83, 84, 85, 86, 88 and 89 terminate either at Journal Square or Hoboken Terminal. The 751 travels to Edgewater and Hackensack.

Jitney commuter buses operate along Bergenline Avenue, providing service to the Port Authority Bus Terminal, the George Washington Bridge Bus Station, the Newport Centre and other local destinations. The county's most frequent route for dollar buses, jitneys operate along Bergenline Avenue as frequently as one bus every minute, some operated by Spanish Transportation.

== Media and culture ==
North Bergen is located within the New York media market, and is no longer covered by a traditional newspaper. The North Bergen Reporter (part of The Hudson Reporter group of local weeklies) ceased publication in January 2023. The Hudson Dispatch was merged with daily paper The Jersey Journal in 1991, and it ceased publishing in February 2025. The Spanish language El Especialito occasionally covers local New Jersey news. River View Observer is a monthly newspaper that covers the Hudson Waterfront market. Online news sites HudsonCountyView.com, HudsonTV.com, weehawkengazette.com, and HudPost.com all cover local North Bergen news.

In the late 2000s, North Bergen, Weehawken, Union City, Guttenberg, and West New York came to be dubbed collectively as "NoHu", a North Hudson haven for local performing and fine artists, many of whom are immigrants from Latin America and other countries, in part due to lower housing costs compared to those in nearby art havens such as Hoboken, Jersey City and Manhattan.

== Notable people ==
People who were born in, residents of, or otherwise closely associated with North Bergen include:

- 070 Shake (born 1997), stage name of rapper Danielle Balbuena
- Mohamed Mahmood Alessa, charged in 2010 with conspiring to join a terrorist group and kill, maim, and kidnap people outside the U.S.
- Carlos Alomar (born 1951), musician, musical director, songwriter
- Kyle Anderson (born 1993), NBA basketball player for the Toronto Raptors
- Rick Apodaca (born 1980), Puerto Rican professional basketball player who has played in the NCAA, USBL, NBDL, and the National Superior Basketball League of Puerto Rico
- Ronald Arévalo (born 2003), soccer player
- Coco Austin (born 1979), actress, dancer, model and wife of rapper/actor Ice-T
- Lidia Bastianich (born 1947), chef, Emmy Award-winning television host, author, and restaurateur
- Odell Beckham Jr. (born 1992), wide receiver for the New York Giants
- James J. Braddock (1905–1974), heavyweight boxing champion from 1935 to 1937
- John O. Brennan (born 1955), Deputy National Security Advisor for Homeland Security in the Obama White House
- James L. Brooks (born 1940), television and film director
- Dan Callandrillo, former professional basketball player
- Edd Cartier (1914–2008), pulp magazine illustrator
- Richard Castellano (1933–1988), American actor
- C. Judson Child Jr. (1923–2004), seventh bishop of the Episcopal Diocese of Atlanta
- Gene Cornish (born 1944), guitarist and harmonica player who is an original member of the 1960s blue-eyed soul band The Rascals
- Leo Cullum (1942–2010), cartoonist best known for his work in The New Yorker
- Frank Cumiskey (1912–2014), artistic gymnast who competed in the 1932 Summer Olympics, in the 1936 Summer Olympics, and in the 1948 Summer Olympics
- Ralph Della-Volpe (1923–2017), painter, printmaker and educator, known for his colorful abstract paintings
- Paquito D'Rivera (born 1948), musician, composer
- Joey Diaz (born 1963), stand-up comedian and actor
- Henry Escalante, pop musician, one of 15 finalists from 2007 season of MTV reality show Making Menudo
- Edward Feigenbaum (born 1936), computer scientist who collaborated on the development of the first expert system Dendral
- Lucio Fernandez, Cuban-American politician and entertainer, who served as the city's Commissioner of Public Affairs
- Louis Freeh (born 1950), former FBI director
- Melissa Fumero (born 1982), actress best known for her role as Amy Santiago in the comedy series Brooklyn Nine-Nine.
- Greg Herenda (born 1961), former head coach of the Fairleigh Dickinson Knights men's basketball team
- Ice-T (born 1958), rap music pioneer and actor
- Dan Kurzman (1922–2010), military historian
- AJ Lee (born 1987), professional wrestler signed to WWE
- Lionel Loueke (born 1973), African Jazz guitarist and sideman to Herbie Hancock
- Luigi Lucioni (1900–1988), painter known for his realistic and precisely drawn still lifes, landscapes, and portraits. Lucioni's family emigrated from Malnate, Italy in 1911 to New York City, and then subsequently lived for a time in North Bergen
- Steve Mocco (born 1981), Olympic wrestler
- Ed Murawinski (born 1951), award-winning cartoonist for the Daily News
- Fred Orlofsky (born 1937), retired artistic gymnast who competed at the 1960 Summer Olympics
- Jesse Pike (1890–1986), cyclist who competed in two events at the 1912 Summer Olympics
- Bill Raisch (1905–1984), dancer and actor, known as the One-Armed Man pursued by Richard Kimble (David Janssen) on the 1963-67 TV series The Fugitive
- Feisal Abdul Rauf (born 1948), Muslim imam, author and activist
- Evan Rodriguez (born 1988), NFL fullback and tight end for the Tampa Bay Buccaneers
- Wilbur Ross (born 1937), investor and former banker
- Nicholas Sacco (born 1946), politician who has served in the State Senate and as Mayor of North Bergen
- John Scarne (1903–1985), author, expert on gambling, card games and magic tricks
- Herbert H. Shaw (1930–2016), independent politician and perennial candidate who has run for office more than 75 times over five decades under the "Politicians Are Crooks" banner
- Rena Sofer (born 1968), actress
- Robert Sundholm (born 1941), outsider artist
- Lou Tepe (born 1930), offensive lineman who played for three seasons with the Pittsburgh Steelers
- Terese Terranova (born 1947), retired para table tennis player who won two gold medals at the 1988 Summer Paralympics
- Guy F. Tozzoli (1922–2013), directed development of the World Trade Center
- Hal Turner (born 1962), far-right political commentator and radio host
- Yordenis Ugás (born 1986) amateur lightweight boxer
- Anthony P. Vainieri (born 1928), politician who served in the New Jersey General Assembly from the 32nd Legislative District from 1984 to 1986
- Mariusz Wach (born 1979), heavyweight boxer

== In popular culture ==
- Oak Hill, a low-budget film starring Sally Kirkland, and directed by former Guttenberg mayor Peter Lavilla, about three former entertainers whose depression and addiction has led them to a homeless shelter, was filmed in both Union City's PERC homeless shelter, and a synagogue in North Bergen. In 2008, it was entered into the Sundance, Tribeca, and Hoboken Film Festivals.
- Cinderella Man, a film starring Russell Crowe as boxer James J. Braddock, depicted North Bergen during the Great Depression. A city park bears his name.
- North Bergen was the production base for the NBC drama Law & Order: Special Victims Unit, with scenes set in the police station and courtroom filmed on a stage at NBC's Central Archives building on West Side Avenue.
- Meat Men is a Food Network reality show about Pat LaFrieda Meat Purveyors, a North Bergen-based family-owned and -operated meat supplier.
- Chapter 8 of Max Payne 3, a third-person shooter video game, takes place in a fictional cemetery in North Bergen.

== See also ==
- North Bergen Reporter
- North Hudson, New Jersey
- Hudson River Waterfront Walkway
- Hackensack RiverWalk
