= New Durham, North Bergen =

Populated place in Hudson County, New Jersey, US

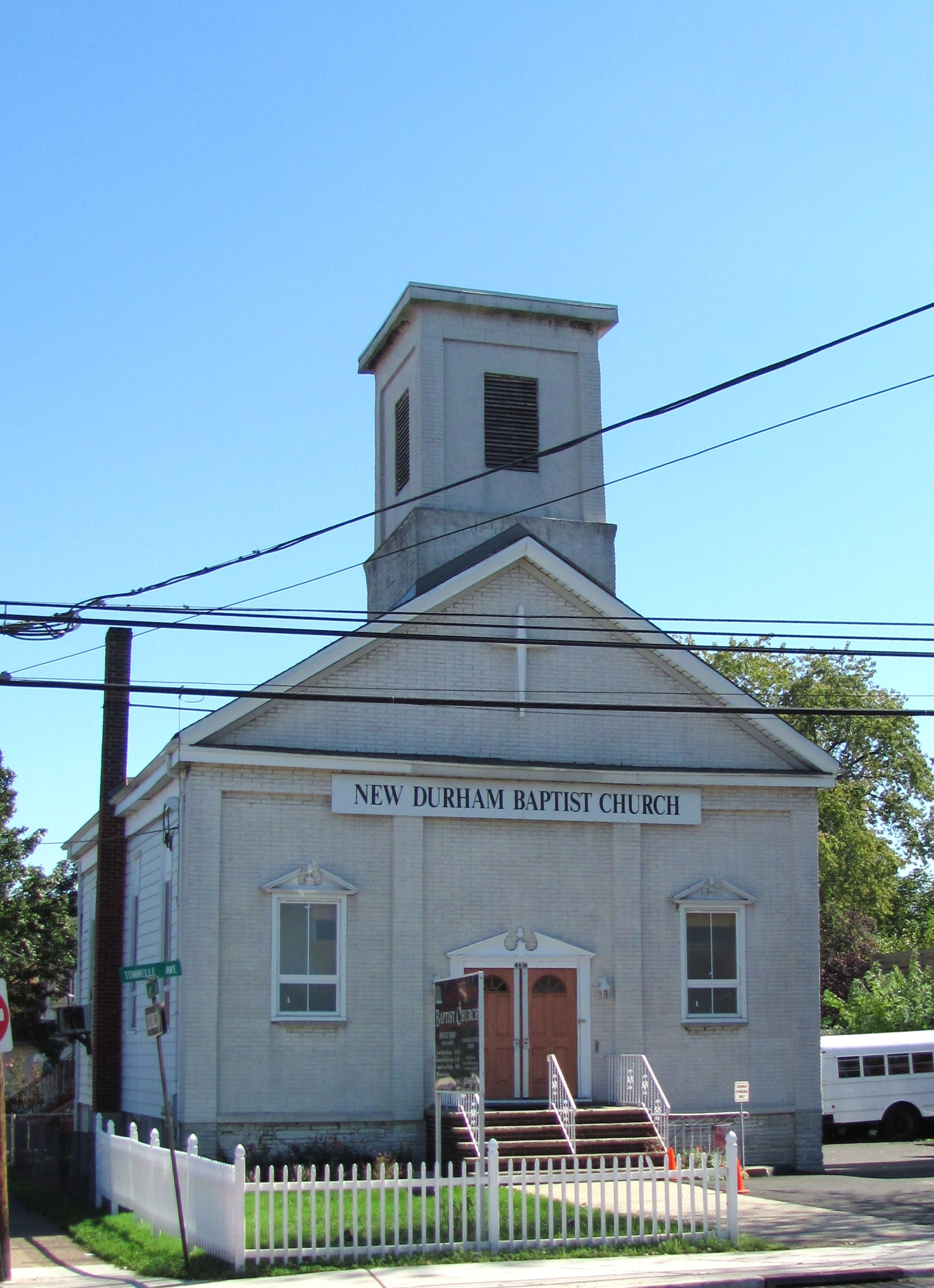
- Church in New Durham

- Location of New Durham in Hudson County Inset: Location of county in the state of New Jersey
- Coordinates: 40°47′05″N 74°01′59″W
- Country: United States
- State: New Jersey
- County: Hudson
- Township: North Bergen
- Elevation: 23 ft (7.0 m)
- Postal code: 07047
- Area code: 201
- GNIS feature ID: 878732

New Durham is a neighborhood in North Bergen in Hudson County, in the U.S. state of New Jersey. It is located near the foot of Union Turnpike and Bergen Turnpike, and south of the Tonnelle Avenue station of the Hudson–Bergen Light Rail. It is one of the few residential areas along the otherwise industrial/commercial U.S. Route 1/9 (Tonnelle Avenue) and the site of one of the town's main post offices.

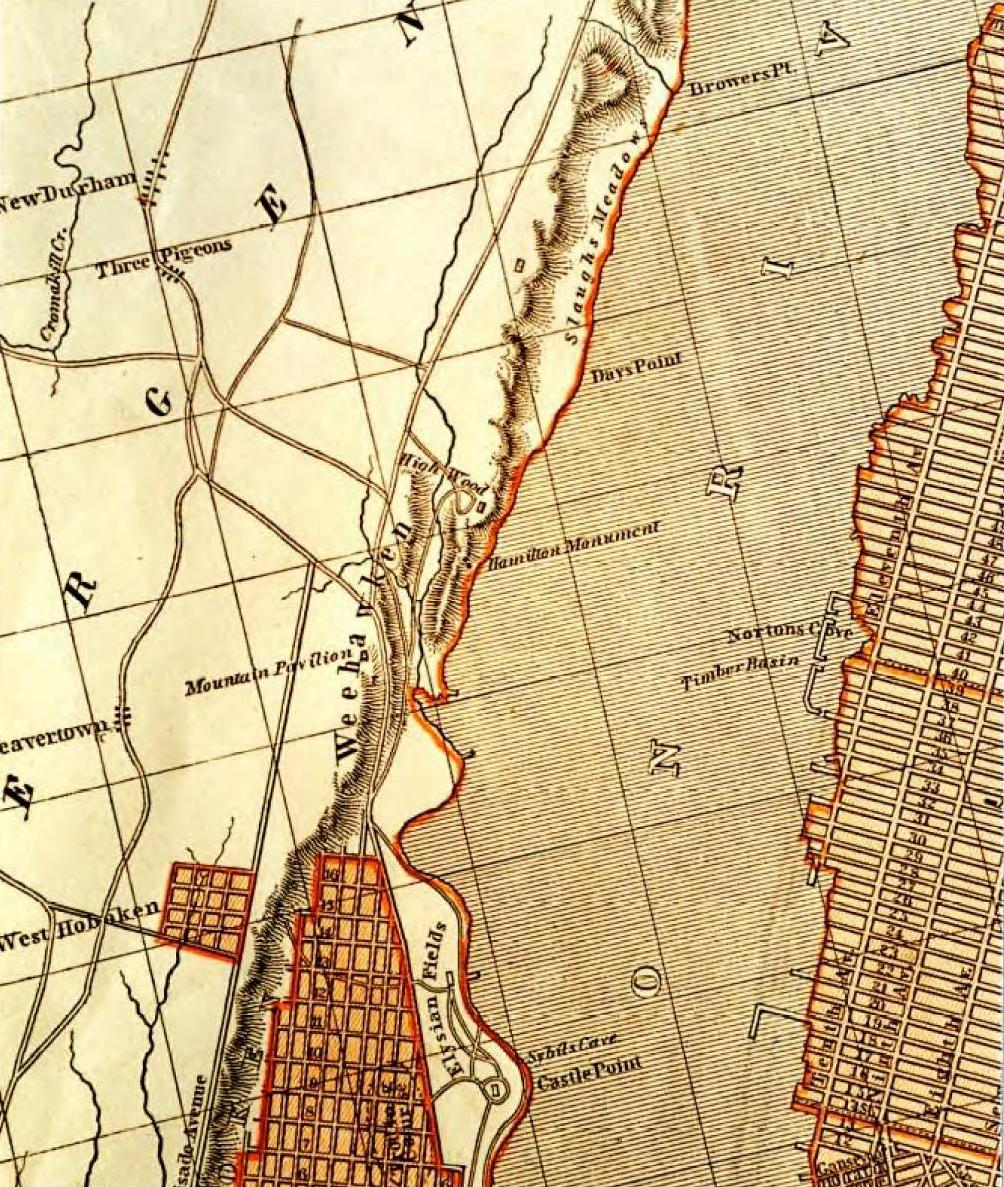
c 1840 New Durham left on map near Three Pigeons

The area was the site of the colonial American community centered on the Three Pigeons when most of North Hudson was called Bergen Woods, a name recalled in Bergenwood Section on the steep slopes of the west side of the Hudson Palisades. Bergen Turnpike was one of the plank roads Hackensack Plank Road, crossing the Bergen Hill and the Hackensack Meadows that joined the village at Bergen Square with that at Hackenack that had been made the county seat of then much larger Bergen County in 1710. A congregation, established in the 1800s, still uses the name for their church.

New Durham was a station stop on New York, Susquehanna and Western Railway's route into Pavonia Terminal, just north of Homestead and the Susquehanna Transfer. The station was located at what is now 50th Street adjacent to North Bergen Yard and the present day terminus of the Hudson–Bergen Light Rail at Tonnelle Avenue.

The Meadowview Section of North Bergen rises to the east of New Durham to the Municipal Building on Kennedy Boulevard. This neighborhood is nestled between the many cemeteries-Flower Hill Cemetery, Grove Church Cemetery, Hoboken Cemetery, Macphelah Cemetery and Weehawken Cemetery, that characterize the area and collectively constitute one of the largest green open spaces in the otherwise densely populated North Hudson area.

== See also ==
- List of neighborhoods in North Bergen, New Jersey
- Maisland
