= Three Pigeons =

Coordinates: 40.782626°N 74.032856°W

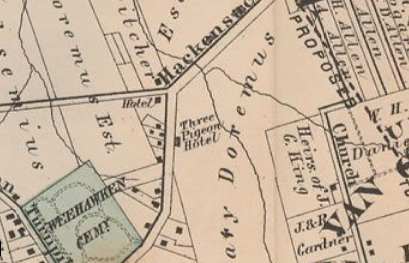
- Map from 1873
- Alternate spelling: Three Pidgeons
- Business: Inn; Hotel; Tavern
- Established: 1700s
- Closed: 1893
- Address: Hackensack Plank Road
- Location: Maisland, New Jersey

The Three Pigeons was a prominent and famous meeting place in Bergen Township, New Jersey, during the revolutionary period, and was used historically as a landmark as well as a popular place for hosting special occasions.

== Location and name ==
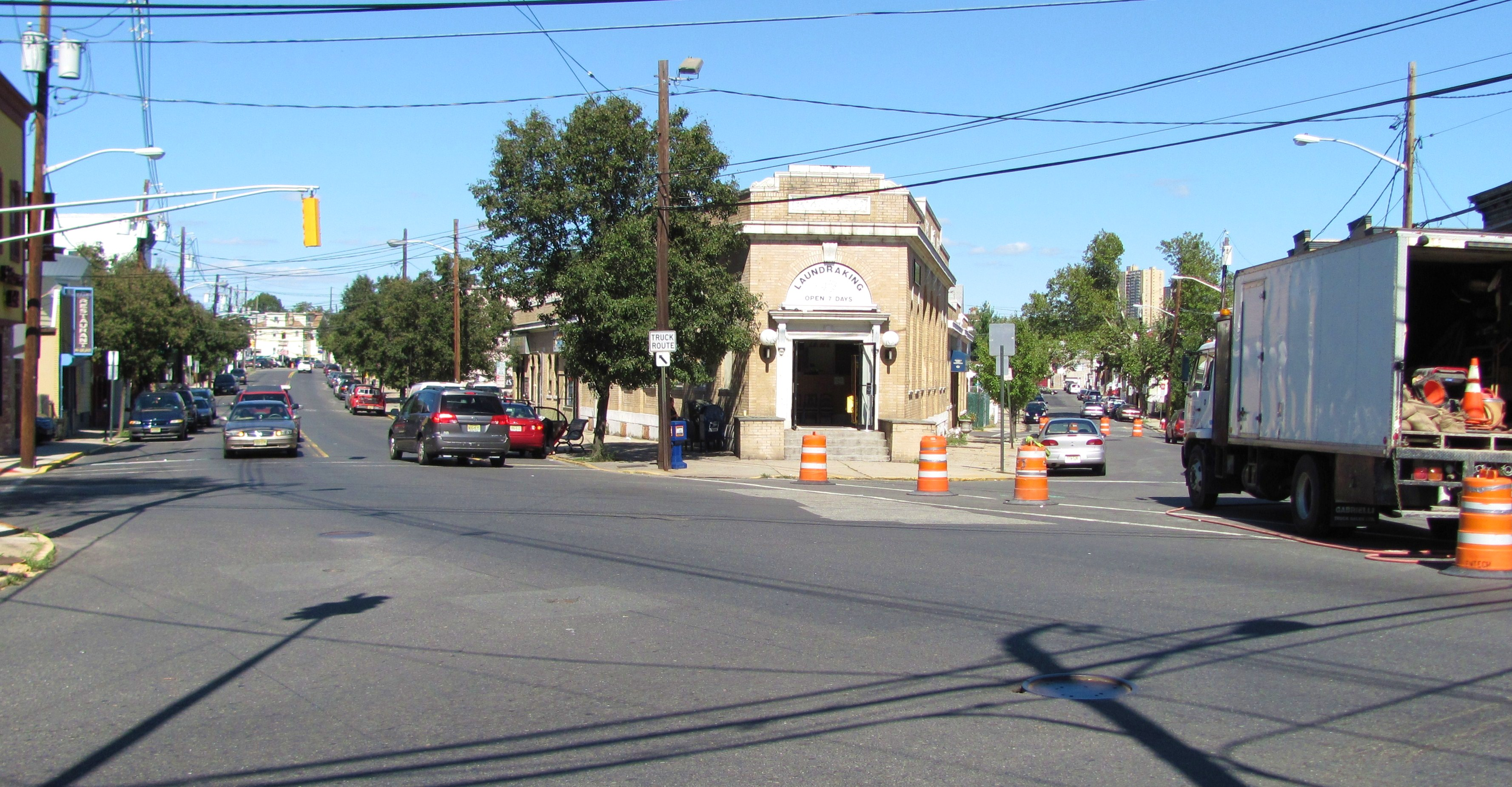
Six Corners intersection, where Three Pigeons stood to the east, or the right side of the street

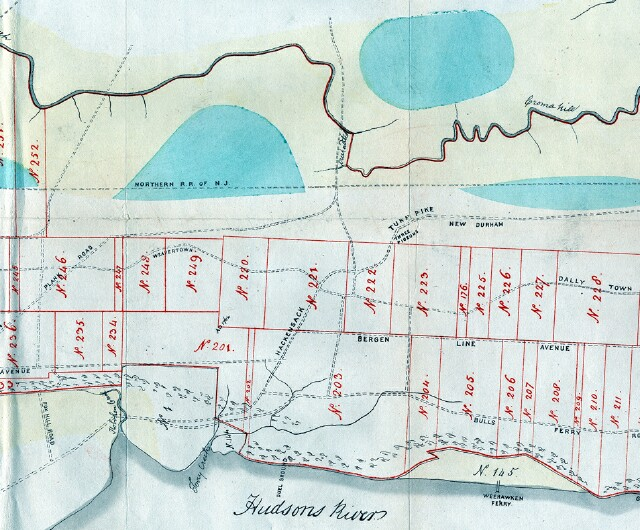
Three Pigeons on Hackensack Turnpike, from a map published in 1872

The Three Pigeons stood at the bottom of the west side of the Hudson Palisades, east of a main road that was later to be the Hackensack Turnpike, and currently Bergen Turnpike. The two-story building was located near the southern fringe of the settlement of Maisland near the intersection of what is now Tonnelle Avenue and Hackensack Plank Road, within modern North Bergen, New Jersey., Today, the intersection is called "Six Corners", where a laundromat and cafe share the same name, in the residential and commercial neighborhood called New Durham.

By the time the inn was erected, the name Three Pigeons had been used repeatedly in plays as the backdrop for scenes, for instance in She Stoops to Conquer (1773), Shakespeare's The Merry Wives of Windsor (1602) and Ben Jonson's The Alchemist (1610). Later literary scenes involving a "Three Pigeons" appear in Creatures of Impulse (1870) and Charles Dickens' Our Mutual Friend (1864–65), as well as in actual inns, such as the English Shakespearian actor John Lowin's "The Three Pigeons" at Brentford. It has been said that the name "Three Pigeons" in any of its variants may have more literary associations than any other tavern name. Many other inns and taverns in England still use this name today.

== History ==
The earliest account is of a tavern keeper, William Earle who was born in 1690, and flourished in the early 18th century. Prior to the American Revolution, the Three Pigeons Tavern was well known in the area during the colonial era where the community in New Durham was located. Along with Snake Hill and Priors' Mills, Three Pigeons made up one of three prominent land points in Hudson County; with the Three Pigeons namely being a site well referenced in describing proximity at the time as well. It has been said that General Washington had also spent time at the Three Pigeons, likely before and during the years of the revolution.

=== American Revolution ===
"Light Horse Harry" Henry Lee III

On March 14, 1779, Colonel Jacob Van Buskirk, an officer in the New Jersey Volunteers, received intelligence that a party of Carolina Troops, along with a Captain and Lieutenant were at the Three Pigeons. Van Buskirk dispatched the Fourth Battalion and a lieutenant to approach the building, but the rebels were able to escape into the Bergen Woods. They were chased for 12 miles (19 km), and in the end after shots were exchanged, two rebels were captured as prisoners.

Months later, during the Battle of Paulus Hook, Major Light Horse Harry Lee along with Captain Handy and the rest of his men moved towards Douwe's Ferry at the Hackensack River to cross with prisoners, only to find no boats, leaving Lee to return the way he came from fear of capture if remaining like sitting ducks. After diverting back, Lee picked up 50 of his lost Virginians at the Three Pigeons and assigned them as flankers. Then at Fort Lee Ferry Road, Lee's troops, as decided by Lord Stirling, were reinforced by Colonel Henry Ball along with 200 additional troops, and soon after were attacked unsuccessfully by Van Buskirk and his Tories from within the Bergen woods. By August 19, Lee led his troops and 159 prisoners safely to New Bridge. One Captain Meals was captured at the Three Pigeons, and on him were found the positions and orders of Lee's command relating to the attack and march at Paulus Hook.

Finally, on October 20, Lee met for the last time with John Champe, a double agent chosen by George Washington and Lee himself in an attempt to capture the American traitor Benedict Arnold, sent Champe up the road up towards the Three Pigeons, and worked to give him a start of about an hour and a quarter before he would release the information of Champe's whereabouts to the dragoons. Just above the Three Pigeons, Champe and the dragoons simultaneously spotted each other; troopers then began pursuit of Champe, but were unsuccessful as Champe had jumped into the Hudson and was picked up by a British boat, claiming to seek British protection in New York City.

Also during the revolution, a Loyalist who had tried to visit his family was captured at the Three Pigeons by Patriots and was subsequently murdered.

=== Afterwards ===
For local Bergen and regional elections, the Three Pigeons was used as a voting house for the mayoral elections from 1804 through 1806; it would open there during these years and close at Peter Stuyvesant's, another local tavern on the southwest corner of Bergen and Glenwood Avenues. James Gore King, a prominent businessmen and Whig Party politician endorsed General Winfield Scott's bid for presidency, a fellow whig, and gave a speech in support at the Three Pigeons in 1852. It had been used repeatedly during the remainder of the 19th century as a landmark for describing official government and military positions, as well as in deed purchases. Finally in 1893, the Three Pigeons was destroyed.

== Sources ==
- Boughton, Willis A. (1948). Arnold Redway and Earle families. Fort Lauderdale, Florida. pp. 108.
- Caledonian (1915). "British and Foreign". The Caledonian. 15. Caledonian Pub. Co: 540. OCLC 500645298.
- Eickmann, Walter Theodore (1948). "History of West New York, New Jersey: in commemoration of its golden jubilee". West New York: 167. OCLC 5882249.
- Gordon, Thomas Francis (1834). "The history of New Jersey: from its discovery by Europeans, to the adoption of the federal Constitution". D. Fenton: 339. OCLC 1557050.
- Hagstrom Map (2008). Hudson County New Jersey Street Map. Hagstrom Map Company, Inc. ISBN 978-0-88097-763-0.
- Henderson, Peter (1975). Campaign of chaos--1776: in the jaws of the juggernaut an eaglet held the stars. Archives Ink. pp. 1140. ISBN 0-915528-01-0.
- Lossing, Benson John (1850). "The pictorial field-book of the revolution". Harper & Brothers. OCLC 1088251.
- McNally, Rand (1896). "Rand, McNally & Co.'s handy guide to the country around New York: for the wheelman, driver, and excursionist : with original maps and illustrations". The Company: 182. OCLC 35184764.
- Mills, Weymer Jay (1902). "Historic houses of New Jersey". J.B. Lippincott: 348. OCLC 1916164.
- Shakespeare, William; Irving, Sir Henry; Marshall, Frank Albert; Dowden, Edward (1888). "The works of William Shakespeare". 3. Blackie: 516. OCLC 10757404.
- Townsend, Thomas (1908). "The home afloat: or, The boy trappers of the Hackensack". Athenia publishing company: 313. OCLC 2509507.
- Wildes, Harry Emerson (1970). Anthony Wayne, trouble shooter of the American Revolution. Greenwood Press. pp. 514. ISBN 0-8371-3383-1.
- Winfield, Charles Hardenburg (1874). "History of the county of Hudson, New Jersey: from its earliest settlement to the present time". Kennard & Hay Stationery M'fg and Print. Co: 568. OCLC 426912.
