= Palisades Medical Center =

Coordinates: 40.7938°N 73.9965°W

- Hackensack Meridian Health

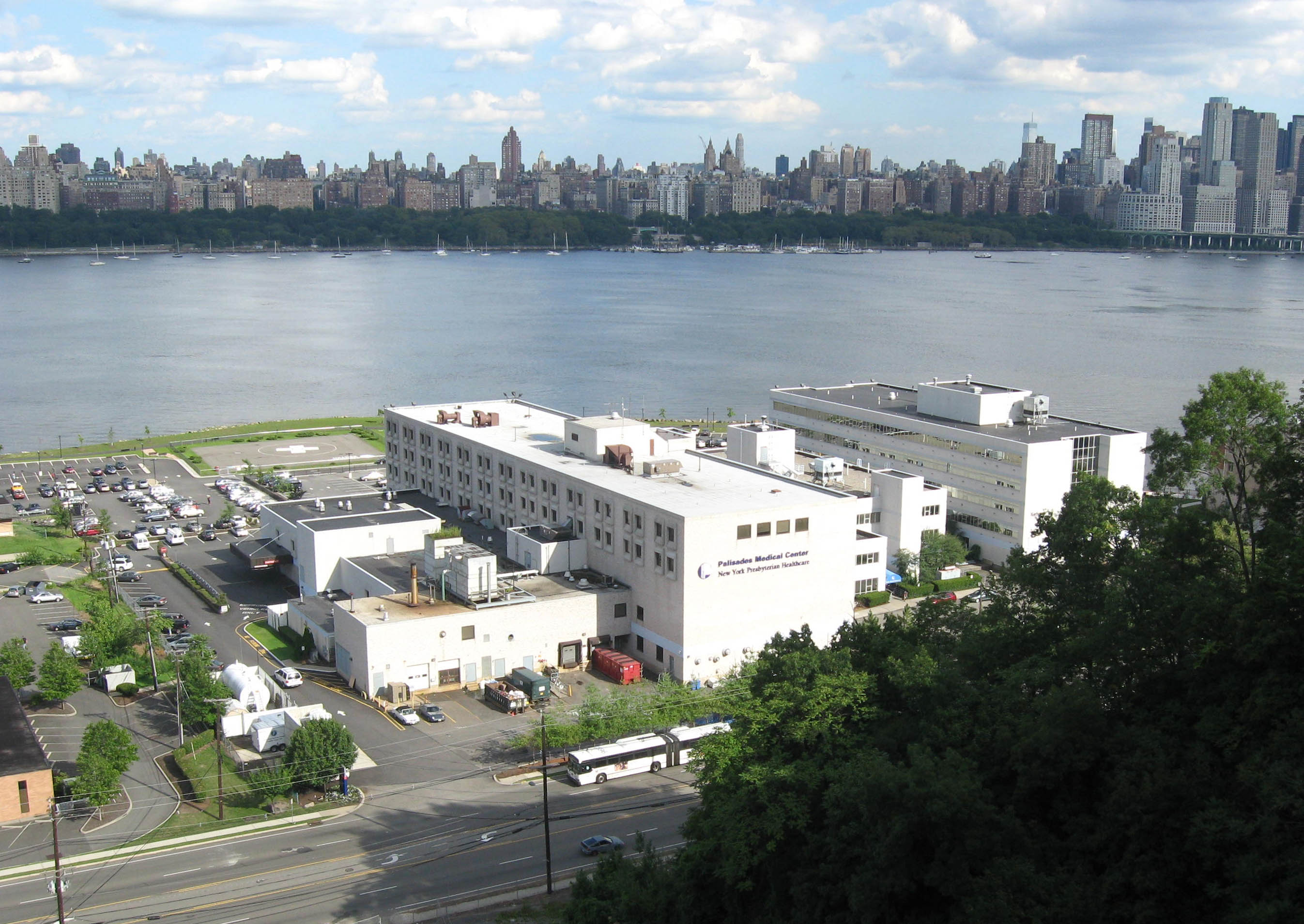

Geography
- Location: 7600 River Road; North Bergen, New Jersey, United States

Organization
- Care system: Medicare (US), Medicaid
- Type: Regional
- Affiliated university: Hackensack Meridian School of Medicine

Services
- Standards: JCAHO
- Emergency department: Yes
- Beds: 186

Links
- Website: http://palisadesmedical.org PMC
- Lists: Hospitals in the United States

Palisades Medical Center (PMC) is a 186-bed hospital located in North Bergen, New Jersey, United States, that serves a population of 400,000 in Hudson County and in Southern Bergen County. The non-profit medical center is part of the Hackensack Meridian Health Network. Connected to the hospital is The Harborage, a 247-bed nursing home and rehabilitation center. In 2016, PMC had more than 1,300 employees, Palisades is the largest employer in its service area and it had an annual operating budget of approximately $150 million.

The New Jersey Hospital Association (NJHA) recognized Palisades Medical Center with its Community Outreach Award in 2011 for a program that serves residents who may not get needed healthcare services due to socioeconomic and language issues. Palisades Medical Center's community outreach and education programs are funded in part by Abbott Nutrition, the Aetna Foundation, The Provident Bank Foundation, Schering-Plough Corporation, TD Charitable Foundation and Toshiba America Medical Systems, Inc.

== About ==
=== Recognition ===
In 2010, New Jersey's annual healthcare report card ranked PMC one of the top hospitals in the state and first in Hudson County. It was also one of only two hospitals in New Jersey to receive a perfect 100% score in treating heart attack patients. Also in 2010, the state's annual evaluation showed that The Harborage at Palisades had "zero deficiencies" - a rating received by only 3% of health care facilities statewide - for three consecutive years.

=== Names ===
PMC was formerly known as North Hudson Hospital and it was located in Weehawken, New Jersey. In 1978, the hospital was relocated to the North Bergen waterfront and renamed Palisades General Hospital. In February 2016, it was formally acquired by Hackensack University Health Network concluding its previous partnership with New-York Presbyterian and rechristened the Palisades Medical Center.

=== Emergency response ===
As of 2022, It is situated on the Hudson Waterfront at the site of Bulls Ferry, across from Manhattan, and is situated between the Lincoln Tunnel and George Washington Bridge. This location makes it an emergency response facility in the event of disasters in the Hudson River area, or for widespread disasters in the surrounding urban areas, including New York City.

On January 15, 2009, two survivors of the Flight 1549 crash landing were taken to PMC following their rescue, where they were treated for hypothermia.

In 2009, the hospital began carrying out renovations and remodeling of its Emergency Department, the first phase of which was completed at the end of July 2010. The renovations were implemented to improve capacity, community access, patient safety and quality of health care delivery. The changes included reconfiguration of the nursing station to improve workflow and augment patient privacy, the presence of all board certified physicians, renovated patient rooms, waiting areas, pediatric care unit and digital radiology, and improved communication to track emergency patients during critical periods and provide medical staff updated status reports, including laboratory and radiology results. The upgrades were made amid a declaration from the Institute of Medicine of the National Academies that the United States is experiencing an epidemic of overcrowded emergency departments, a problem particularly severe in New Jersey, due to its high population density (New Jersey has the highest in the county), and a poverty rate in the North Hudson and South Bergen Counties that is four times the New Jersey average. Renovations planned in 2010 were designed to allow walk-in patients direct access to the Emergency Department from the waiting area.

=== Funding ===
The Palisades Medical Center Foundation gathers support from local residents, businesses and other organizations to enable PMC and The Harborage nursing and rehabilitation center to improve facilities and programs. The annual Palisades Medical Center Fashion Show raises funds for Guardians of Healing, a group of local health care professionals who serve in countries in need of medical assistance. It also is the benefactor of donations and philanthropy earmarked for specific projects or improvements.

=== Health Insurance Portability and Accountability Act controversy ===
On September 21, 2007, actor George Clooney and companion Sarah Larson were taken to PMC for treatment after a motorcycle accident. Patient information was disseminated to the media before any official hospital statement was issued. The hospital conducted an audit and announced that 27 employees had accessed Clooney's information without prior authorization. All 27 employees were suspended for one month without pay. The employees included nurses, support staff, and security guards. A union representing some staff challenged seven of the suspensions.

== Performance ==
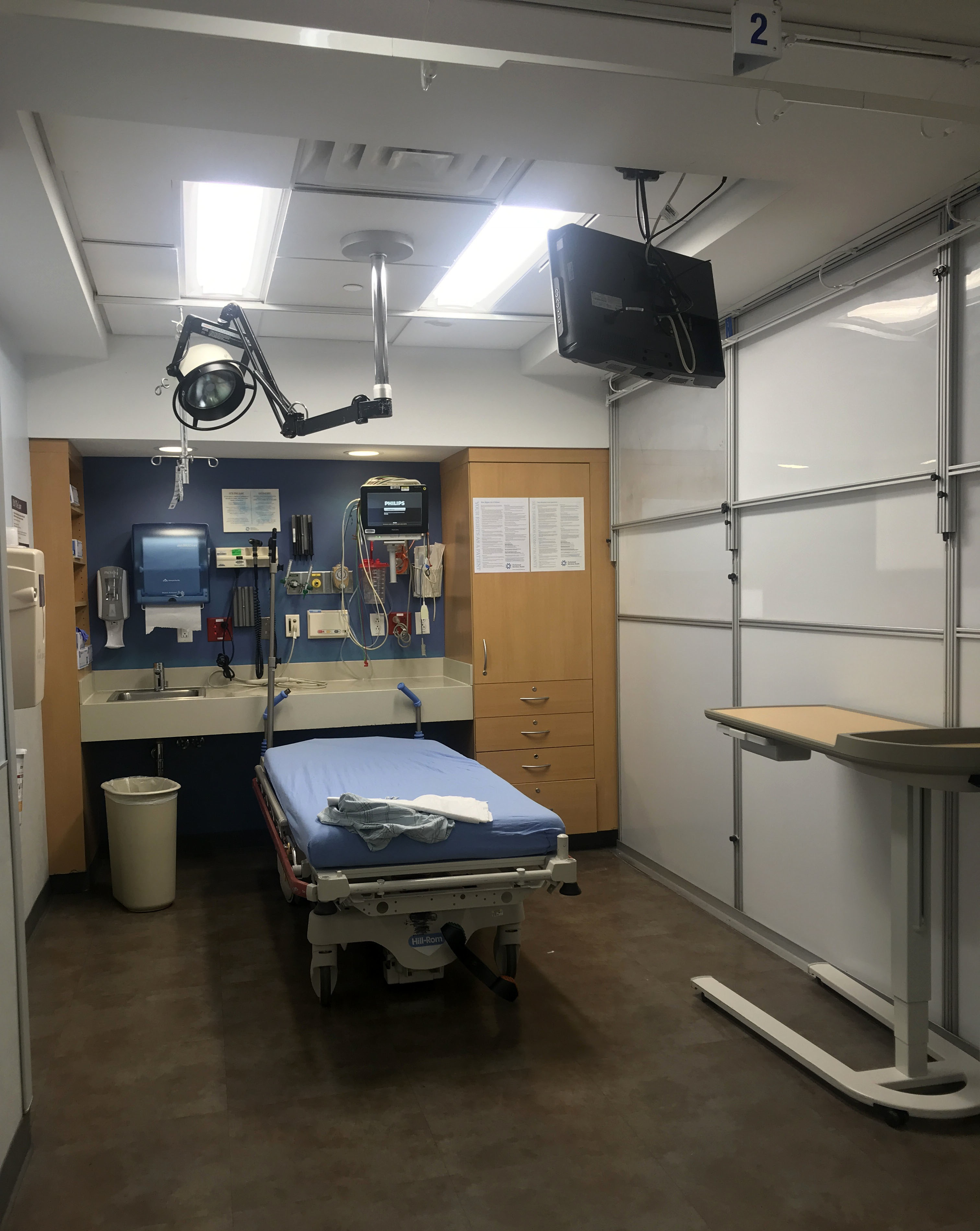
Emergency Room kiosk #2 at Palisades Medical Center

By 2009, waiting times at Palisades Medical Center were reduced to nine minutes, with a maximum of 11 minutes, improvements that were attributed to the a mid-2009 update to PMC's emergency room, specifically, the construction of a Rapid Evaluation Unit (REU), in which patients are asked questions and treated by two nurses: a technician and a physician. The REU features digital radiology, a Picis computer system that permits rapid delivery of a patient's history, a Vital Works computer system that provides staff with up-to-the-minute updates, new cardiac, stroke and ventilator equipment, a renovation of patient waiting rooms and staff facilities, and a pneumatic tube that can vacuum specimens directly to the hospital's lab.

Palisades Medical Center received among the highest scores in Hudson County in the New Jersey Department of Health's 2009 Hospital Performance Report, which is based on self reporting from each institution. The Center scored in the top 10% of hospitals in the state for their care of heart attacks, surgical improvements, and heart failure, receiving 100, 98 and 100 in those areas, respectively, percentages which represent the number of patients treated properly and released. PMC received 98% for pneumonia, greater than 50% of hospitals in the study. Its performance in pneumonia was due to a 98% correct preventative antibiotic timing, and 93% blood culture rate. Beginning and ending antibiotic treatment at the right time crucial to prevent infection. At PMC .03 of patients received accidental punctures or lacerations, compared to a national average of 3.6. PMC had a post-operative sepsis rate of 42 per 1,000, compared with a 2004 national average of 11.4 cases per 1,000 patients treated (four times higher than the national average), and a 2007 statewide rate of 13.9 cases per 1,000 patients.

In October 2010, Lori-Ann Ligon, the former director of Respiratory Care at PMC, was given the 2010 Instrumentation Laboratory (IL) Achievement Award by the New Jersey Society for Respiratory Care (NJSRC) at the NJSRC's annual conference in Atlantic City. The IL Award recognizes individuals who have contributed significantly to both the state society in general, and the Respiratory Care profession in general.

In 2021, it was listed by the Lown Institute as one of the 50 best hospitals for racial inclusivity.
