= Bulls Ferry =

Populated place in Hudson County, New Jersey, US

Coordinates: 40.7938°N 73.9965°W

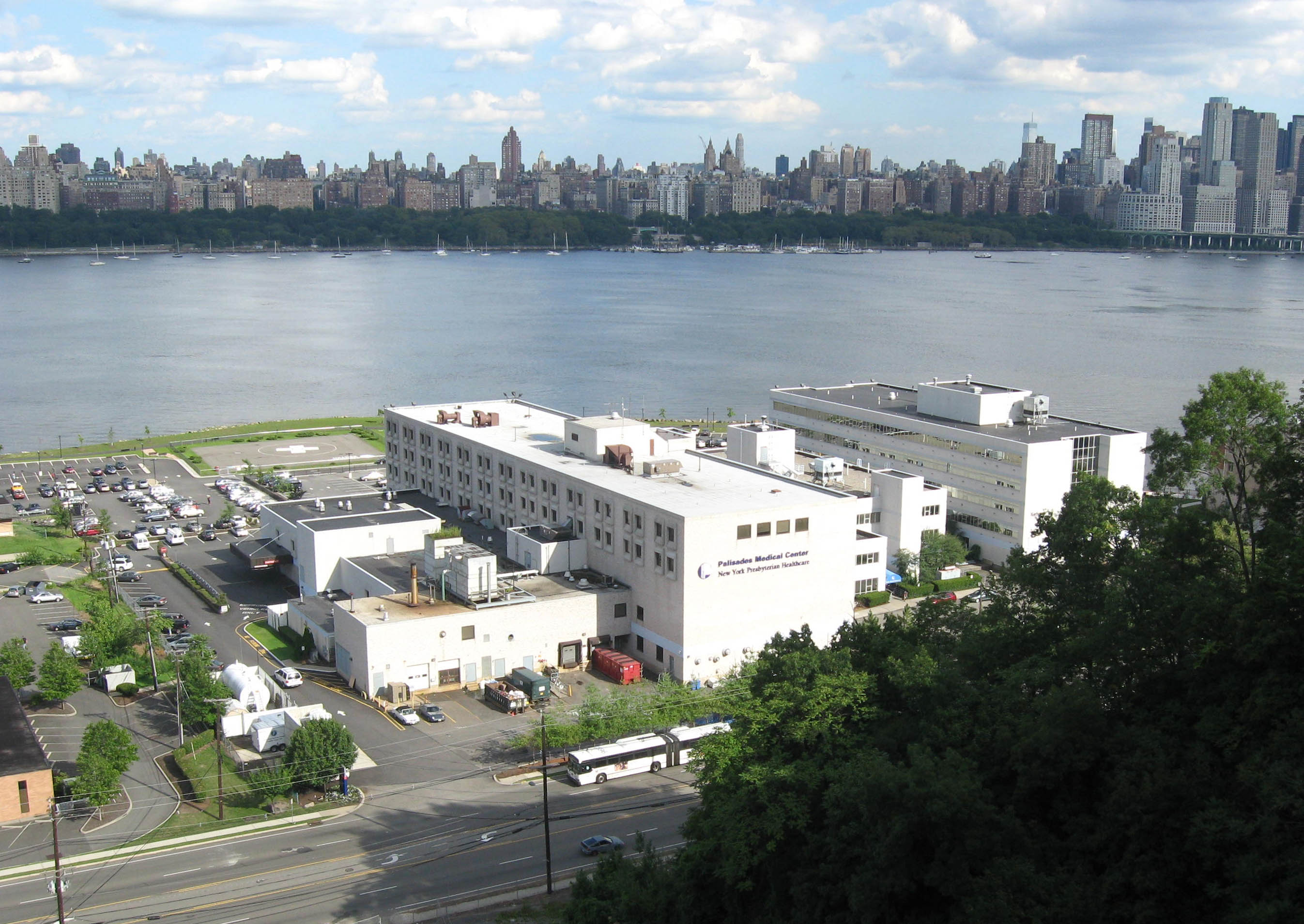
Palisades Medical Center

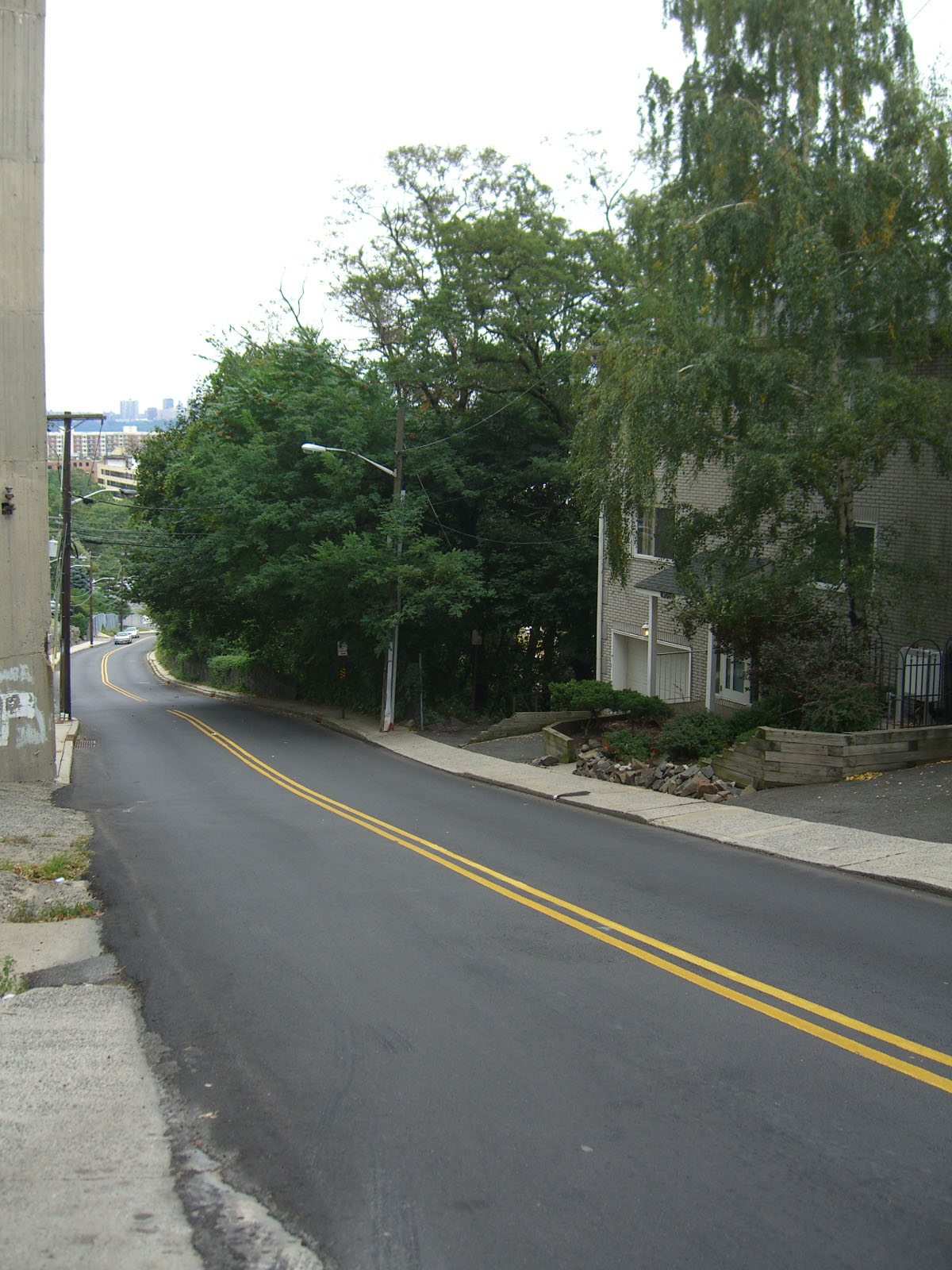
Bull's Ferry Road travels from Boulevard East atop the cliffs to the waterfront.

Bulls Ferry (also Bull's Ferry) is an area along the Hudson River, just north of Weehawken Port Imperial in the towns of West New York, Guttenberg and North Bergen in New Jersey. It takes its name from a pre-Revolutionary settlement belonging to the Bull family, who operated a row-and-sail ferry to the burgeoning city of New York across the river.

During the Revolutionary War, the British built and occupied a blockhouse in the area of Bull's Ferry, an area known to the British as Block House Point. This fort was the site of several skirmishes between the British and American forces. Brigadier General Anthony Wayne led American troops from New Bridge on an unsuccessful raid against the blockhouse on July 20, 1780, in the Battle of Bull's Ferry. After the raid, the blockhouse was abandoned when British troops decamped to the fort at Bergen Neck.

Like Burdett's Landing to the north, Bull's Ferry was a crucial crossing point well into the 19th century. Ferry service continued for several decades until steam ferries, notably from Hoboken, replaced the earlier, brute-force rowing service. Larger terminals to the north at Edgewater and south at the West Shore Railroad Terminal operated until the 1950s. Modern ferries still commute to Manhattan out of Port Imperial in Weehawken, Hoboken and Paulus Hook in Jersey City (as well as Sandy Hook on the Jersey shore).

A number of roads ran down the Hudson Palisades to the ferry slip. Bull's Ferry Road was the original name of Park Avenue and Woodcliff Avenues up on the palisades in North Hudson, and is still used for a street winding around the Stonehenge Tower and descending from Boulevard East to River Road in North Bergen. Another, simply called Ferry Road, passes under the Galaxy Towers which overlook the neighborhood. The slip itself was close to the part of Edgewater once known as Shadyside.

Since the 1980s, previous industrial and maritime uses of the area at the foot of the Palisades have given way to residential, institutional and recreational development, including the Palisades Medical Center and the Hudson River Waterfront Walkway. The district's major thoroughfare is commonly known as River Road, which is served by New Jersey Transit routes 158 and 188 and NY Waterway buses, with connecting service to Weehawken Port Imperial.

In April 2011, Guttenberg, and North Bergen agreed to jointly build a park south of Palisades Medical Center, which would include a waterfront promenade. The Hudson River Waterfront Walkway is an esplanade along the water's edge from Bayonne to Fort Lee.

== See also ==
- Pershing Road (Weehawken)
- List of neighborhoods in North Bergen, New Jersey
- List of ferries across the Hudson River in New York City
- Odonyms in Hudson County, New Jersey
