= Shadyside, Edgewater =

Populated place in Bergen and Hudson Counties, New Jersey, US

Coordinates: 40.820565°N 73.979874°W

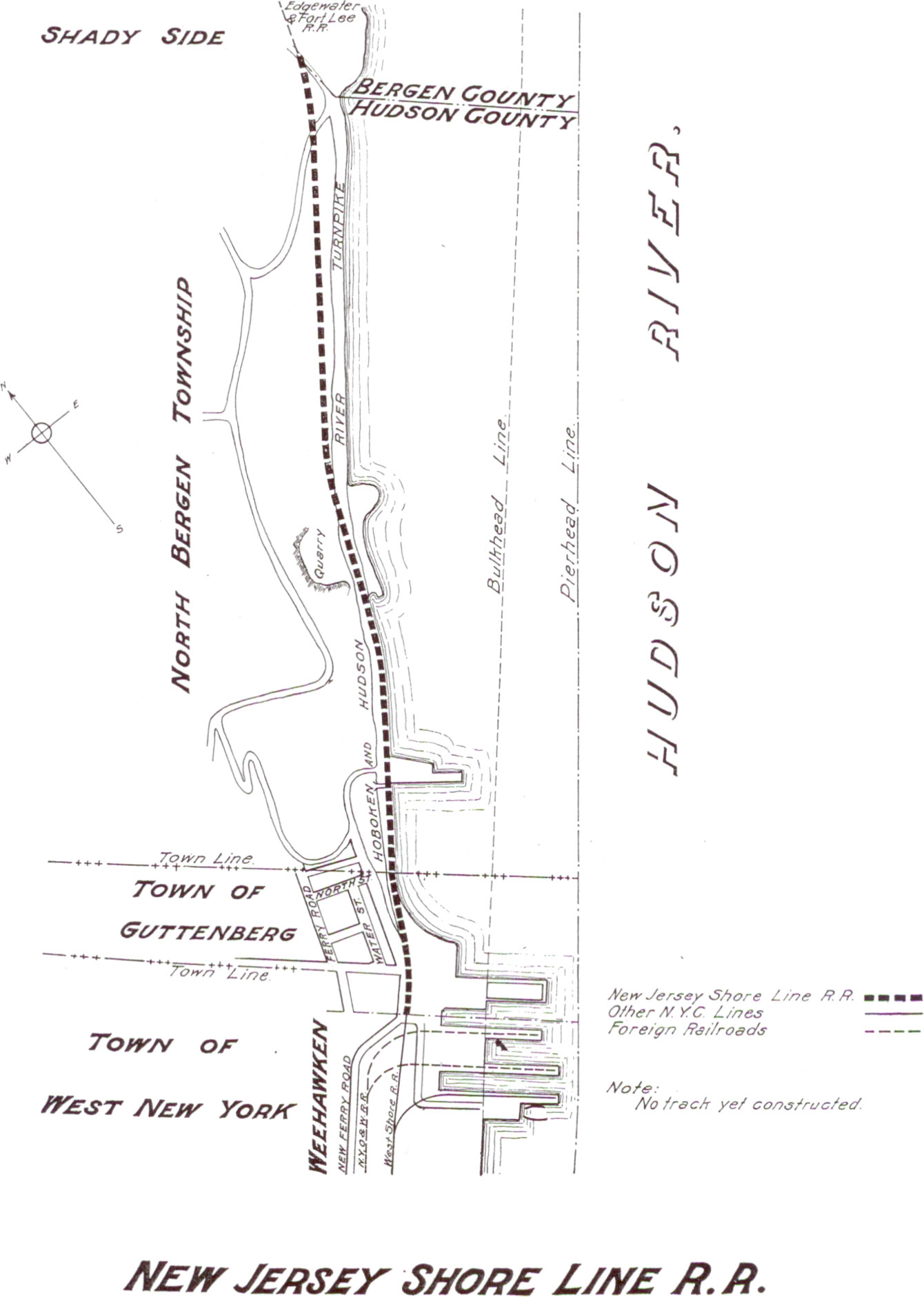
Shadyside at the Bergen and Hudson county line.

Shadyside is the southernmost neighborhood of Edgewater, New Jersey that overlaps the waterfront of neighboring North Bergen, New Jersey. It likely takes its name from the fact that its position on the west bank of the Hudson River is sometimes in the shadow of the Hudson Palisades. Shadyside was developed in the late 19th century as a manufacturing village, and railroad terminal for New York, Susquehanna and Western Railway at the end of the Edgewater Tunnel, and site of a major explosion at a glucose plant in 1906. It lies north of the neighborhood Bulls Ferry, a major river crossing of the period. North of this are the neighborhoods of Pleasant Valley, Undercliff, and Burdett's Landing (Edgewater Colony). The Public Service Railway operated streetcar lines from the Edgewater Ferry Terminal.

Previous industrial and transportation uses of the area have since the 1980s given way to residential and recreational development, including the Hudson River Waterfront Walkway. The district's major thoroughfare is commonly known as River Road, which is serviced by New Jersey Transit routes 158 and 188 and NY Waterway buses, with connecting service to Port Imperial, Weehawken.
