= Tross (surname) =

Tross is a surname. Notable people with the surname include:

- Joseph Samuel Nathaniel Tross (1889–1971), American evangelist
- Mark Tross, American Christian pastor
- Samantha Tross (born 1968), British orthopaedic surgeon
- Sherry Tross, Saint Kitts and Nevis diplomat

== See also ==
- Tross, 16th century German camp followers
- Trössing, Austria
- Trossingen, Germany
- Toso (surname)
