= Kristen Harris =

Professor of Neuroscience

- Born: North Dakota
- Education: Minnesota State University Moorhead (BS); University of Illinois (MS); Northeastern Ohio Universities College of Medicine (PhD)
- Occupations: Professor, neuroscientist

Kristen Harris is Professor of Neuroscience and Fellow in the Center for Learning and Memory at the University of Texas at Austin. Her research group at UT Austin uses serial section electron microscopy to study synapses. She is also a member of the Institute for Neuroscience and the Center for Theoretical and Computational Learning.

== Early life and education ==
Harris was born in North Dakota. In 1976, she earned a bachelor's degree at Minnesota State University Moorhead, majoring in biology and minoring in both chemistry and mathematics. Three years later, she earned her master's degree from the University of Illinois and went on to do graduate work at Northeastern Ohio Universities College of Medicine. She obtained a PhD in neurobiology in 1982, after which she held a two-year postdoctoral position at Massachusetts General Hospital.

== Career ==
Harris was a member of the faculty in Neurology at the Harvard Medical School and Children's Hospital, Boston until 1999. Then she moved to Boston University where she helped to establish an inter-departmental Program in Neuroscience. In 2002, she established the Synapses and Cognitive Neuroscience Center at Medical College of Georgia. Harris was recruited to the University of Texas at Austin.

== Research ==
Harris's research focus is to elucidate structural components involved in the cell biology of learning and memory. She focuses on seven main areas of research, which include

- Behavior
- Cell Biology of neurons, muscle & glia
- Developmental Biology
- Ion Channels, Neurotransmitter Receptors & Molecular Signaling
- Learning & Memory
- Neural Development & Plasticity
- Synaptic Biology & Small Circuits

== Awards ==
- 1999–2004 Packard Foundation Grant
- 2002–04 Councilor, Society for Neuroscience
- 2002–06 Georgia Research Alliance Eminent Scholar
- 2003 Wiersma Visiting Professor, Caltech
- 2003 Distinguished Alumna Award, Minnesota State University Moorhead
- 2012–present Scientific Advisory Board, Max Planck Institute for Brain Research, Frankfurt, Germany
- 2014–present Scientific Advisory Board, HHMI – Janelia Research Campus, Virginia
- 2014 Outstanding Speaker Award, American Association for Clinical Chemistry
- 2015–present Scientific Advisory Board, Allen Institute for Brain Research, Seattle, WA
- 2016 Elected Fellow, AAAS
- 2024 Elected Member of the National Academy of Sciences (NAS)
