= Bobby Marks =

American basketball executive and reporter (born 1973)

Bobby Marks (born July 9, 1973) is the NBA Front Office Insider for ESPN, previously performing this position for Yahoo! Sports' The Vertical. He had previously spent 20 years working in the NBA, the last five as assistant general manager of the Brooklyn Nets. Marks began his work for ESPN in July 2017.

Marks started as an intern with the Nets in 1995 and rose to title of assistant general manager in 2010. He has extensive knowledge with issues related to the NBA salary cap, player contracts, trades, draft, free agency and the day-to-day operation of a professional basketball team. In 2012, Marks was recognized by Crain's New York Business as one of its "Top 40 Under 40" in New York. During his career with the Nets, the team made two Finals appearances. Before leaving the Brooklyn Nets, he was the longest-tenured member of the front office.

Within a very short time after leaving the Nets, Marks became an NBA commentator on Twitter, described as an "insanely popular capologist of Twitter" according to SB Nation. By the late part of 2015 and early 2016 he was discussing NBA affairs on various media outlets leading to his position with The Vertical. Marks wrote for The Vertical and was published on Yahoo News prior to joining ESPN.

Now residing in Naples, Florida, Marks attended Passaic Valley Regional High School and is a 1995 graduate of Marist College.
