= North Hudson Regional Fire and Rescue =

Operational area
- Country: United States
- State: New Jersey
- County: Hudson

Agency overview
- Established: 1999
- Staffing: Career
- Fire chief: David Donnarumma

Facilities and equipment
- Fireboats: 2

Website
- Official website
- IAFF website

North Hudson Regional Fire and Rescue provides fire protection and first responder emergency medical services to the northern part of Hudson County, New Jersey. Included in their protection area are the communities of North Bergen, Union City, Weehawken, West New York, and Guttenberg.

The department is part of the Metro USAR Strike Team, which consists of nine North Jersey fire departments and other emergency services divisions working to address major emergency rescue situations.

== History ==
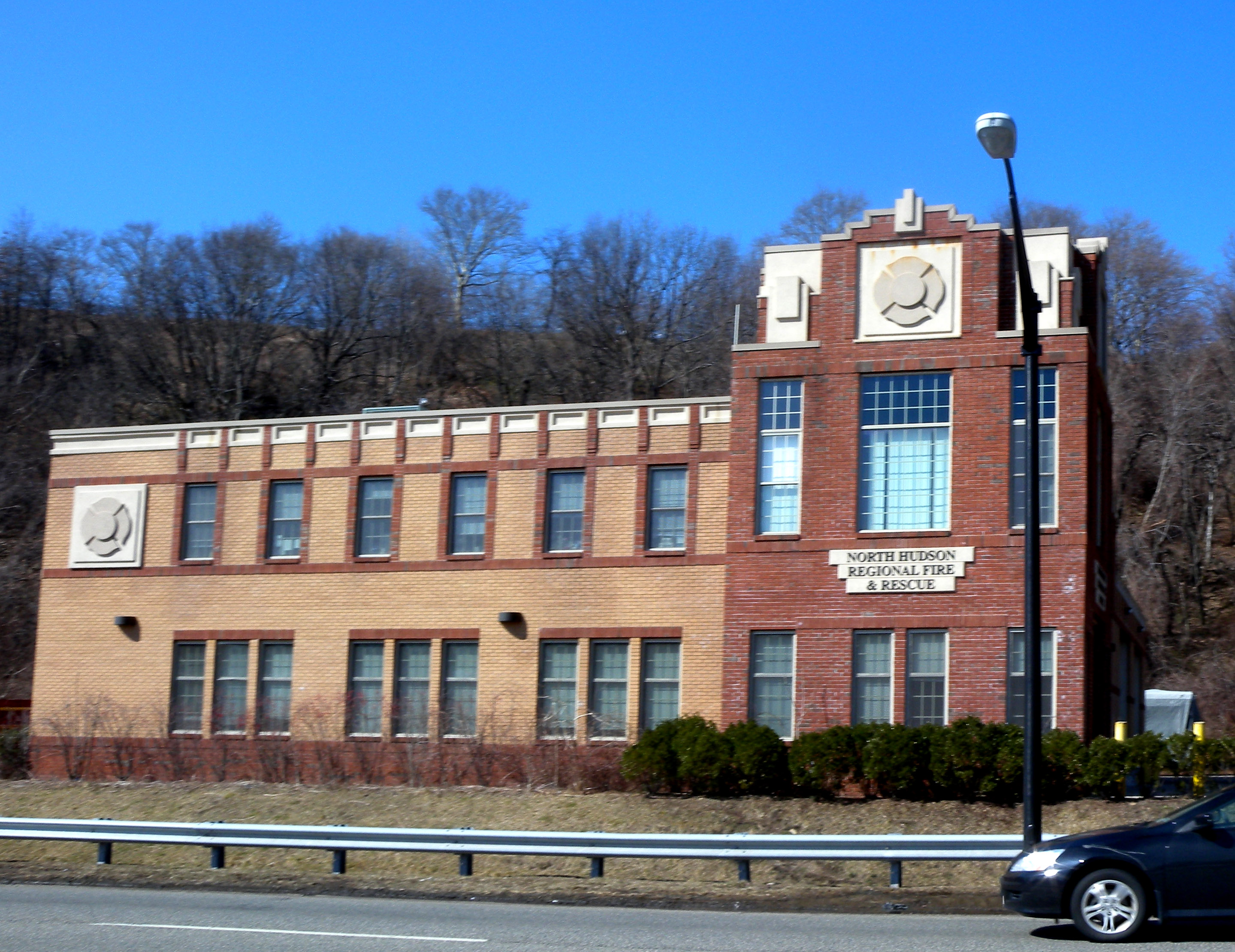
North Hudson Regional Fire and Rescue's Fire Headquarters, located in West New York

Discussions to consolidate the North Hudson fire departments began in the early 1980s.

The North Hudson Regional Fire and Rescue (NHRFR) was established on January 11, 1999. The former fire departments of North Bergen, Union City, Weehawken, West New York, and Guttenberg were merged to provide a safer, more efficient fire department. A buyout was offered by the State giving any members with at least 20 years of service up to an additional five years towards their 25-year required time for retirement. Through this attrition the department was able to pare down the number of personnel in the newly formed department. Most Firefighters from all of the Departments that had the time, took advantage of it and retired under their own prior Departments retirement contract and benefits. The last member to retire from the NHRFR under a former FD city contract was Battalion Chief James McMains on December 31, 1999, from the Township of North Bergen, under the NBFD Officers contract. From that point a new contract was negotiated for the NHRFR, and former city contracts no longer existed.

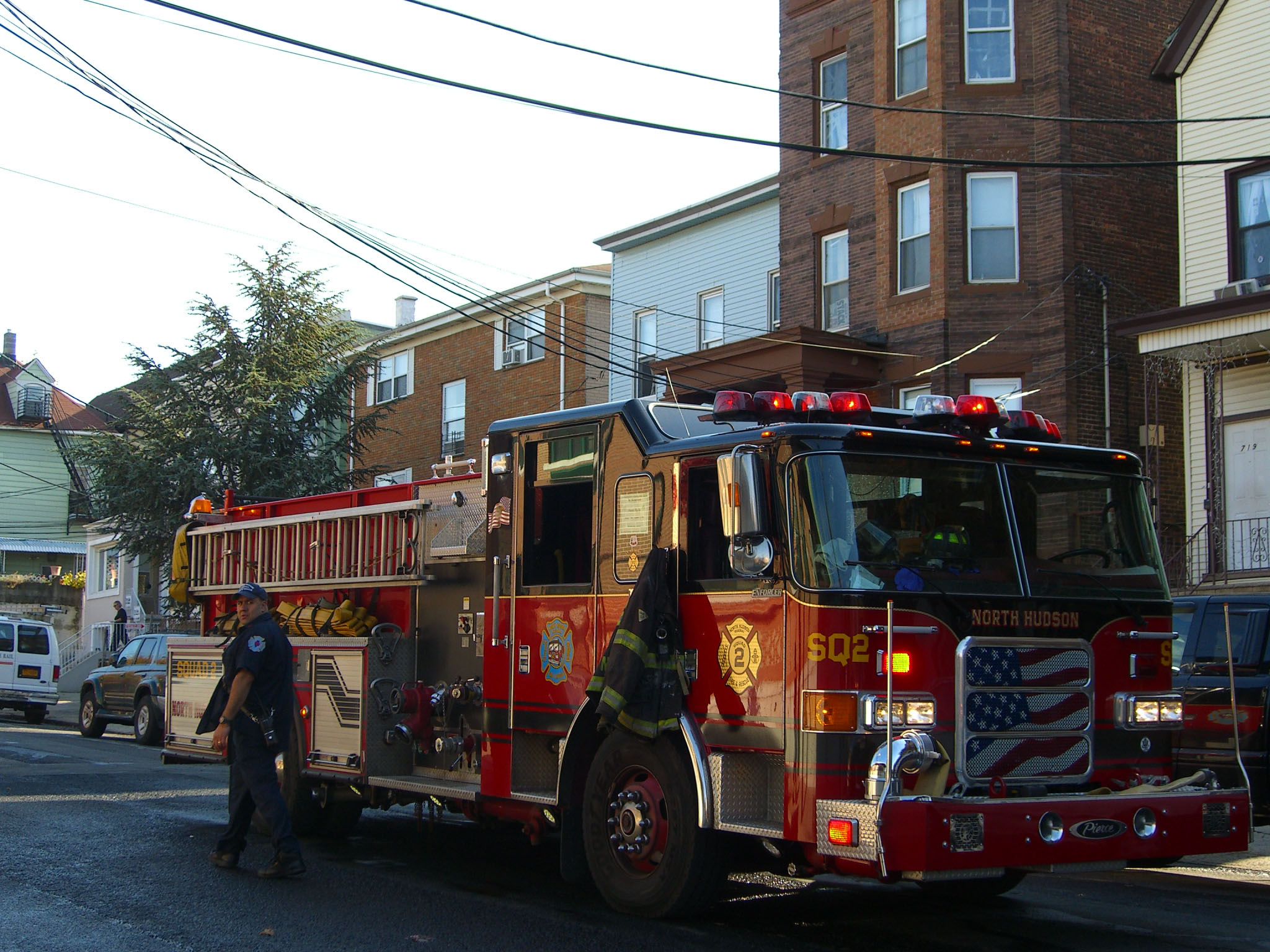
NHRFR Squad 2 operating at a fire in Union City

The agency created a new headquarters on Port Imperial Boulevard in West New York in 2007 to serve the waterfront area.

North Hudson Regional Fire and Rescue was among the many Hudson County agencies that responded to the January 2009 crash of Flight 1549, for which they received accolades from the survivors.

In July 2009, North Hudson Regional Fire and Rescue began closing their Rescue Company and the rotational closings of three engine companies. The following January, two buildings adjacent to Engine Company 9 burned down while the company was closed.

The organization opened a two-story firehouse in June 2010 at 4300 Kennedy Boulevard, purchased for $1.2 million, and renovated for $1.5 million, in part with a $500,000 federal grant. The building was constructed to house Engine Company 5, formerly housed in a building a block away that Union City Mayor Brian P. Stack described as "antiquated", as well as Rescue Company 1. Stack further stated that the Kennedy Boulevard location, which is actually located off Kennedy Boulevard, would give the firefighters easier access to the area, as Kennedy Boulevard is a four-lane road that runs through the entire county, whereas the previous location was situated in the middle of a block. The agency's dispatch center, which was formed 30 years prior, also moved to a new state-of-the-art facility at the new location, as the equipment at its former, less spacious location at 50th Street and Broadway was deemed outdated.

The agency rotated the closing of various firehouses for certain hours in order to save money until July 2010, when it closed two of its firehouses, according to NHRFR chairperson and Weehawken Mayor Richard F. Turner, in order to allow the remaining 13 to stay open 24 hours, and save $500,000 in overtime costs from July 1 until the end of 2010. Turner further disclosed that the newly implemented Strategic Reorganization Plan, which took two years to create, would also save additional funds. Though Turner insisted that this would not affect performance, Dominick Marino, the head of the North Hudson Firefighters Association, reacted to the closings by stating that this would sacrifice response time from certain locations, and that with the closing of Ladder 2, the agency would not have enough firefighters. According to Marino, "Evidence shows that [a ladder and engine] responding at the same time eliminates the circumstances a lot quicker than having to wait." Marino further asserted that the closing of Engine 6 would mean that the entire west area of North Bergen would lose coverage, and that the promotion of 22 people to higher ranks in the last week of June, including 14 captains, five battalion chiefs and two deputies, meant that there was insufficient personnel to keep the houses open. Turner stated that hiring would be considered, based on upcoming retirements. Turner later stated the intention to hire new members in early 2011.

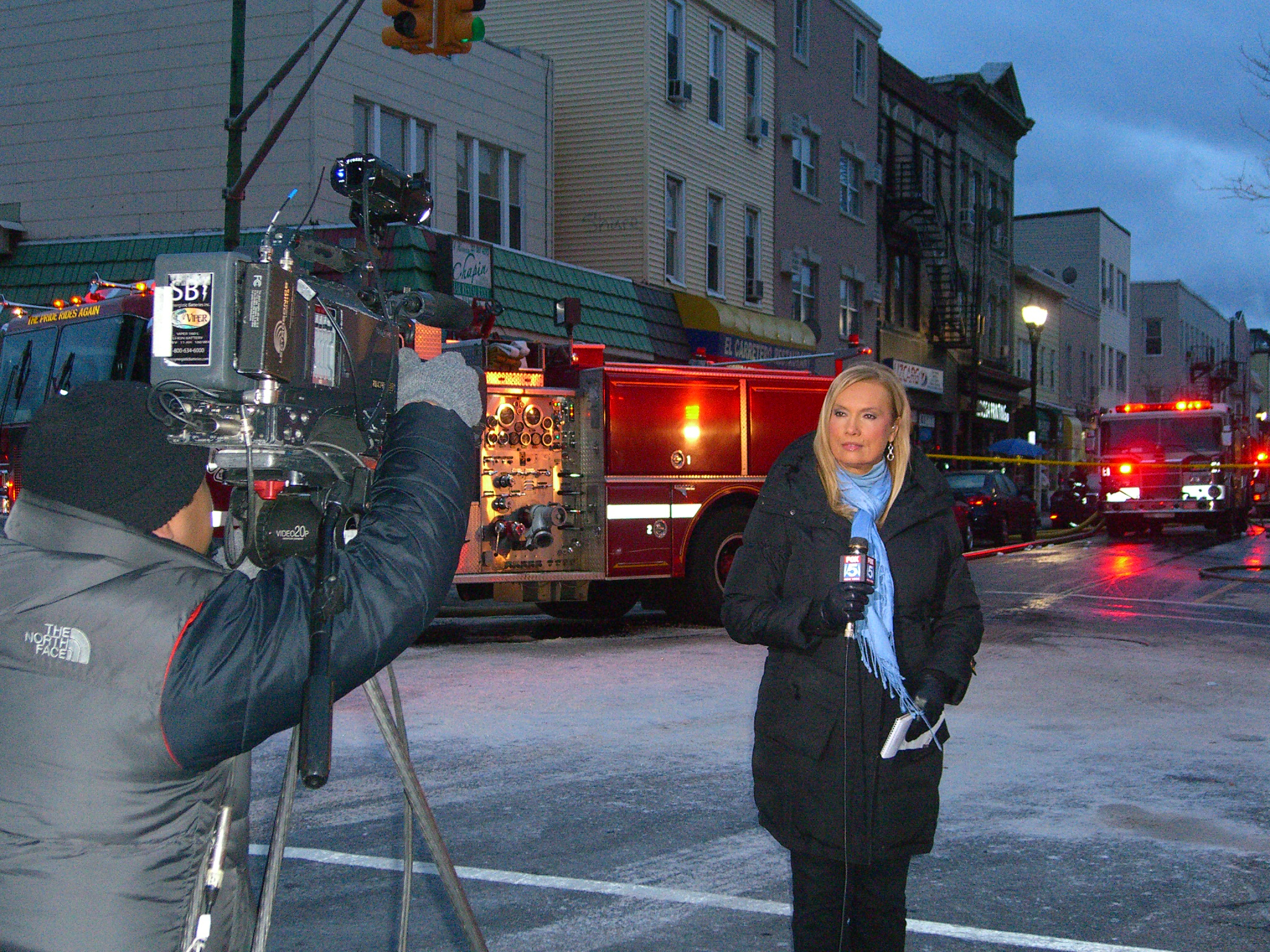
Fox 5 News reporter Lisa Evers reporting on a January 2012 Union City fire to which the NHRFR responded

The agency's 2010 budget, which was passed on August 17, 2010, is $55.9 million, a 3% increase from the previous year's budget of $54.2 million, with the largest increase in health benefits, which are covered by Horizon Blue Cross. (The NHRFR was previously covered by Cigna.) The August 17 meeting also saw the passing of a resolution allowing the agency to pay contractual terminal benefits, or retirement packages, to firefighters over the course of the five years following their retirement, instead of entirely within the year of their retirement. This resolution followed the passing a New Jersey state law (N.J.S.A 40A:4-53) that NHRFR officials indicated supersedes contractual obligations with unions.

On December 12, 2011, the Third Circuit Court of Appeals ruled that the departments hiring policy discriminated against African-Americans, because it only accepted residents of local towns, who are predominantly Latino and Caucasian. The lawsuit, which was filed in 2007 by the Newark branch of the NAACP on behalf of three black firefighters, was the latest development in a longstanding controversy over whether the NHRFR should hire applicants from outside towns.

In July 2014, the NHRFR launched Marine 1, a new fireboat obtained through a 2010 $1.2 million FEMA port security grant. Marine 1 was specially designed for the areas served by the NHRFR, which include buildings and walkways situated very close to the edge of the Hudson River. Manufactured by Metal Craft Marine in Ontario, Canada, Marine 1 can operate in less than two feet of water, and carries four hose guns capable of supplying 4,250 gallons of water per minute and 100 gallons of firefighting foam for combustible liquid fire. It is also equipped with infrared cameras and night vision googles. It joins a smaller, 27-foot-long quick response boat that was also acquired through a grant two years earlier. Both boats are docked at Lincoln Harbor in Weehawken.
