= Stephen Ledogar =

American diplomat (1929–2010)

Personal details
- Born: Stephen Joseph Ledogar; September 14, 1929 New York City, U.S.
- Died: May 3, 2010 (aged 80) Edgewater, New Jersey, U.S.
- Education: Fordham University
- Occupation: Ambassador, diplomat

Military service
- Allegiance: United States
- Branch/service: United States Navy (United States Navy Reserve)
- Years of service: 1949–1952 (Navy); 1954–1960 (Navy Reserve)
- Rank: Lieutenant

Stephen Joseph Ledogar (September 14, 1929 – May 3, 2010) was a United States ambassador and diplomat.

Born in New York City, Ledogar graduated from Fordham University in 1954, where he later received his law degree in 1958. He served in the United States Navy 1949-1952 and the Navy Reserve 1954–1960. In the Navy, he was a Lieutenant and naval aviator. He drafted three international arms control treaties and served in three different administrations. A resident of Guttenberg, New Jersey, Ledogar died of bladder cancer on May 3, 2010.
