= Center for Learning and Memory =

Research institute at The University of Texas at Austin

- Established: 2004
- Field of research: Neuroscience
- Location: Austin, Texas, United States
- Operating agency: The University of Texas at Austin
- Website: clm.utexas.edu

The Center for Learning and Memory is a research institute at The University of Texas at Austin with a mission of advancing memory research. The center consists of faculty affiliated with the university's psychology and neuroscience departments as well as neurology and psychology faculty from Dell Medical School.

== History ==
The Center for Learning and Memory was founded in 2004 by professor Daniel Johnston.

== Activities ==
=== Austin Conference on Learning & Memory ===
The center hosts an annual academic conference centered on memory and learning research.

=== Memory Matters ===
The center offers an annual public outreach event in Austin called Memory Matters to engage the community in neuroscience-related topics.
