= Passaic Valley Regional High School =

High school in Passaic County, New Jersey, US

Passaic Valley Regional High School District

Address
- 100 East Main Street Little Falls, Passaic County, New Jersey, 07424; United States
- Coordinates: 40.878468°N 74.220007°W

District information
- Grades: 9-12
- Superintendent: Bracken Healy
- Business administrator: Colin Monahan
- Schools: 1

Students and staff
- Enrollment: 1,093 (as of 2024–25)
- Faculty: 82.4 FTEs
- Student–teacher ratio: 13.3:1

Other information
- District Factor Group: FG
- Website: www.pvrhs.org
Ind.	Per pupil	District spending	Rank (*)	9-12 average	%± vs. average
1A	Total Spending	$19,115	12	$18,891	1.2%
1	Budgetary Cost	13,807	10	15,592	−11.4%
2	Classroom Instruction	8,014	14	8,807	−9.0%
6	Support Services	1,388	1	2,294	−39.5%
8	Administrative Cost	1,488	16	1,592	−6.5%
10	Operations & Maintenance	2,134	31	1,954	9.2%
13	Extracurricular Activities	770	17	873	−11.8%
16	Median Teacher Salary	68,575	26	71,726
Data from NJDoE 2014 Taxpayers' Guide to Education Spending. *Of 9-12 districts with any number of students. Lowest spending=1; Highest=47

Passaic Valley Regional High School

Information
- Type: Public high school
- Motto: "It's a great day to be a hornet."
- Established: 1940
- NCES School ID: 341257004858
- Principal: Krista Voorhis
- Faculty: 82.4 FTEs
- Grades: 9-12
- Enrollment: 1,093 (as of 2024–25)
- Student to teacher ratio: 13.3:1
- Colors: Green and white
- Athletics conference: Big North Conference (general); North Jersey Super Football Conference (football)
- Team name: Hornets

Passaic Valley Regional High School is the name of both a public school district and regional high school for students in ninth through twelfth grades from a district comprised of Little Falls, Totowa and Woodland Park, three communities in Passaic County, in the U.S. state of New Jersey. The high school is the only facility in the Passaic Valley Regional High School District.

As of the 2024–25 school year, the school had an enrollment of 1,093 students and 82.4 classroom teachers (on an FTE basis), for a student–teacher ratio of 13.3:1. There were 347 students (31.7% of enrollment) eligible for free lunch and 51 (4.7% of students) eligible for reduced-cost lunch.

The Passaic Valley board of education consists of nine members, with three members elected from each municipality. The board generally meets on the second and fourth Tuesdays of each month during the school year and once a month during the summer.

== History ==
Overcrowding at Paterson Central High School led the three constituent municipalities in 1938 to begin discussions for the formation of a regional school district that would serve an estimated 600 students at a cost that would be comparable to the amounts paid in tuition for the sending/receiving relationships with the Paterson Public Schools and more cost effective than building high schools in each community.

Constructed at a cost of $500,000 (equivalent to $11.5 million in 2025), nearly half of which was covered by a grant from the Public Works Administration, the school was designed to handle an enrollment of 650 to as many as 800, and was opened to students in September 1940. The school mascot, the Hornet, was derived by vote of the first class from the Green Hornet radio series popular in the 1940s, as were the school colors of green and white.

The district had been classified by the New Jersey Department of Education as being in District Factor Group "FG", the fourth highest of eight groupings. District Factor Groups organize districts statewide to allow comparison by common socioeconomic characteristics of the local districts. From lowest socioeconomic status to highest, the categories are A, B, CD, DE, FG, GH, I and J.

== Awards, recognition and rankings ==
As of 2019, the school is ranked 233rd out of 415 New Jersey public high schools. The school was the 225th-ranked public high school in New Jersey out of 339 schools statewide in New Jersey Monthly magazine's September 2014 cover story on the state's "Top Public High Schools", using a new ranking methodology. The school had been ranked 202nd in the state of 328 schools in 2012, after being ranked 144th in 2010 out of 322 schools listed. The magazine ranked the school 170th in 2008 out of 316 schools. The school was ranked 166th in the magazine's September 2006 issue, which surveyed 316 schools across the state.

Schooldigger.com ranked the school 192nd out of 381 public high schools statewide in its 2011 rankings (a decrease of 4 positions from the 2010 ranking) which were based on the combined percentage of students classified as proficient or above proficient on the two components of the High School Proficiency Assessment (HSPA), mathematics (79.1%) and language arts literacy (92.3%).

== Academics ==
Passaic Valley Regional High School offers the following Advanced Placement courses: Biology, Chemistry, Physics, Calculus AB, English Literature & Composition, English Language & Composition, United States History, Spanish, United States Government & Politics, and Environmental Science. The school also offers the following courses as honors: Anatomy and Physiology, English, United States History, World History, Algebra I, Algebra II, Pre-Calculus, Geometry, Italian, French, Spanish, Business Practice Firm, Biology and Chemistry.

The school also is part of the Fairleigh Dickinson University Middle College Program where students may choose to obtain college credits for selected courses including Anatomy & Physiology Honors and Holocaust & Genocide.

== Extracurricular activities ==
Passaic Valley participates in "24 Hours Around the World" in which students teleconference with other nations for 24 hours.

Passaic Valley's Drama Department is a part of the North Jersey Metro Cappies, a student critic program that introduces students to the world of theater journalism. They run a summer program where students in grades 9-12 all around the NJ/NY area can work together on a performance.

On March 1, 2019, Passaic Valley celebrated its 74th annual Girl's Show where girls within the school, separated into two teams, compete in the following categories: Exercise, Cheer, Dance, Relays and Novelties, and Posters.

== Athletics ==
The Passaic Valley Regional High School Hornets compete in the Independence Division of the Big North Conference, which is comprised of public and private high schools in Bergen and Passaic counties, and was established following a reorganization of sports leagues in Northern New Jersey by the New Jersey State Interscholastic Athletic Association. In the 2009-10 school year, the school competed in the North Jersey Tri-County Conference, which was established on an interim basis to facilitate the realignment. Prior to the realignment, the school had participated in the Skyline Division of the Northern Hills Conference, which included schools in Essex, Morris and Passaic counties. With 930 students in grades 10-12, the school was classified by the NJSIAA for the 2019–20 school year as Group III for most athletic competition purposes, which included schools with an enrollment of 761 to 1,058 students in that grade range. The football team competes in the Patriot Blue division of the North Jersey Super Football Conference, which includes 112 schools competing in 20 divisions, making it the nation's biggest football-only high school sports league. The school was classified by the NJSIAA as Group III North for football for 2024–2026, which included schools with 700 to 884 students. Passaic Valley's school colors are green and white.

The school participates as the host school / lead agency in a joint ice hockey team with Cedar Grove High School. The co-op program operates under agreements scheduled to expire at the end of the 2023–24 school year.

The boys' cross country running team won the Group III state championship in 1961 and the Group IV title in 1962.

The boys' bowling team won the overall state championship in 1973.

The football team won the North I Group IV state championships in 1975, 1979, 1980 and 1986. The 1975 team finished with an 11-0 record after winning the North I Group IV state sectional title with a 23-7 victory against North Bergen High School in the playoff finals. In 1979, the team finished 11-0 after defeating Clifton High School by a score of 15-0 to win the North I Group IV state sectional championship game at Giants Stadium. The team repeated as North I Group IV state champion with a 20-0 win against Fair Lawn High School in the finals at Giant Stadium to finish the season at 10-1. The 1986 team won the North I Group IV state sectional title with a come-from-behind 14-10 win against North Bergen in the championship game played at Roosevelt Stadium, to finish the season 9-2. In 2006, the football team beat Wayne Valley High School during the regular season and again in the playoffs, making it to the semi-finals before losing to defending North I Group III champions, Wayne Hills High School. Under first year coach Al Capello, the Hornets made it to the North II Group III state championship at Giants Stadium on December 4, 2009, losing to West Morris Mendham High School by a score of 28-19.

The field hockey team won the North I Group IV state sectional championship in 1976, 1977, 1981, 1984, 1986 and 1987. In 2005 and 2006, the girls' field hockey team won back-to-back county championships led by Coach Cheryl Grande, before repeating as county champion in 2009, defeating Wayne Hills High School in the final game in all three championship seasons.

The softball team won the Group IV championship in 1977 (defeating runner-up Sayreville War Memorial High School in the finals) and the Group III title in 2000 (vs. Middletown High School South). The 1977 team won the Group IV state title with an 11-1 victory in the playoff finals against Sayreville to run their season record to 29-2. The 2000 softball team finished the season with a record of 28-3 after defeating Middletown South by a score of 6-0 in the tournament final to win the Group III state championship. The team won all five playoff games by shutout and set a state record by giving up eight runs the entire season.

The boys' wrestling team won the North I Group IV sectional title in 1981, the North II Group II title in 2005 and the North II Group III title in 2010 and 2016.

In 2007-2010, the girls' varsity gymnastics team won the county championships, led by Coach Jenai Agosta. No other team in the 24 years of county championships has won the championship in four consecutive seasons.

Alexis (Missy) Arena continues to hold the gymnastics all-time state record for All Around (AA) scoring with a 37.95 set in 2009. Arena's score breaks the previous mark of 37.325 by Passaic Valley's own Jackie Friscia in 2006. The meet dates to 1986. Arena also holds the 2010 New Jersey State beam Champion title with a 9.475, she placed third on vault with a 9.575 and fifth in the all-around with a 37.25.

In 2007, the boys' basketball team won the North I, Group III state championship, defeating Wayne Valley High School by 60-48, in a game played at Passaic County Technical Institute. The win was their first ever sectional championship in school history and came in Head Coach Rob Carcich's third season. The Hornets advanced to the New Jersey State Interscholastic Athletic Association state championship game held at the RAC at Rutgers University. The boys' basketball team returned to the sectional final in 2011, this time losing to Teaneck High School on March 8, 2011. They returned to the Sectional final again in 2008 losing once again to Teaneck who was ranked #3 in the state at the time. The team had a record of 150-85 in the previous nine seasons.

In 2007, the varsity baseball team, led by Head Coach John Mazzo, won the Passaic County Championship with a 4-2 victory over Passaic County Technical Institute, the team's third title and their first since repeating in 1998 and 1999. In 2010, they advanced to the Passaic County final, losing to Wayne Valley High School by a score of 5-4.

In 2007, George Abyad won the Penn Relays discus championship at the University of Pennsylvania in Philadelphia.

In 2008, the boys' ice hockey team won their first Nardello Cup, 3-2 against River Dell High School.

In the 2009 spring season, senior Gerardo Valenzuela of the boys' tennis team won the County Championship at 2nd Singles.

In Fall 2009, the Marching Band won 2nd Place against six other bands in the Group 2A division at the Yamaha Cup competition that was held in Giants Stadium. In Fall 2011, the Marching Band won 1st place against four other bands in the Group 3A division at Verona High School. In Fall 2016, The Passaic Valley Marching Band placed 4th at the USBands state championship for group 2A.

In the 2009-2010 season the Hornets Wrestling Team captured the state sectional championship by beating Roxbury in the finals. Then they captured the District 13 Tournament championship. In 2012 again they were able to get the District 13 Tournament championship.

== Administration ==
Core members of the district's / school's administration are:

- Bracken Healy, superintendent
- Colin Monahan, business administrator and board secretary
- Krista Voorhis, principal

== Board of education ==
The district's board of education, comprised of nine members, sets policy and oversees the fiscal and educational operation of the district through its administration. As a Type II school district, the board's trustees are elected directly by voters to serve three-year terms of office on a staggered basis, with three seats up for election each year held (since 2012) as part of the November general election. The board appoints a superintendent to oversee the district's day-to-day operations and a business administrator to supervise the business functions of the district. Seats on the board of education are allocated based on population, with Little Falls, Totowa and Woodland Park each allocated three seats.

== Notable alumni ==
- David Blaine (born 1973, class of 1991), magician
- Jeff Chase (born 1968), film and television actor who played for the Albany Firebirds of the Arena Football League
- Frank DeCaro (born 1962), class of 1980, writer, entertainer, and satellite radio talk show host; co-wrote and hosted Out at the Movies segments on The Daily Show with Jon Stewart
- D. C. Fontana (1939–2019, class of 1957), television script writer and story editor, best known for her work on the original Star Trek franchise and several western television series
- Daniela Gioseffi (born 1941), poet, novelist and performer who won the American Book Award in 1990
- Kyle Gurrieri (born 1998), professional soccer player with the Wilmington Hammerheads FC of the United Soccer League who transferred out of Passaic Valley after his freshman year
- Daniel Johnston (born 1947), neuroscientist whose research has focused on the electrical properties of neuronal dendrites
- Bobby Marks (born 1972/73), former National Basketball Association assistant general manager of the Brooklyn Nets
- Ralph J. Marra Jr. (born 1953), former United States Attorney for the District of New Jersey
- Michael P. Moran (1944–2004; class of 1964), actor and playwright
- Michael Peter Smith (1941–2020), singer-songwriter
- Aidan Stokes (born 2008), footballer who plays as a goalkeeper for Major League Soccer club New York Red Bulls and MLS Next Pro side New York Red Bulls II
- Mark Tross (born 1957), Christian pastor, radio and television personality, columnist, and former disk jockey
