= Guttenberg Public School District =

School district in New Jersey, United States

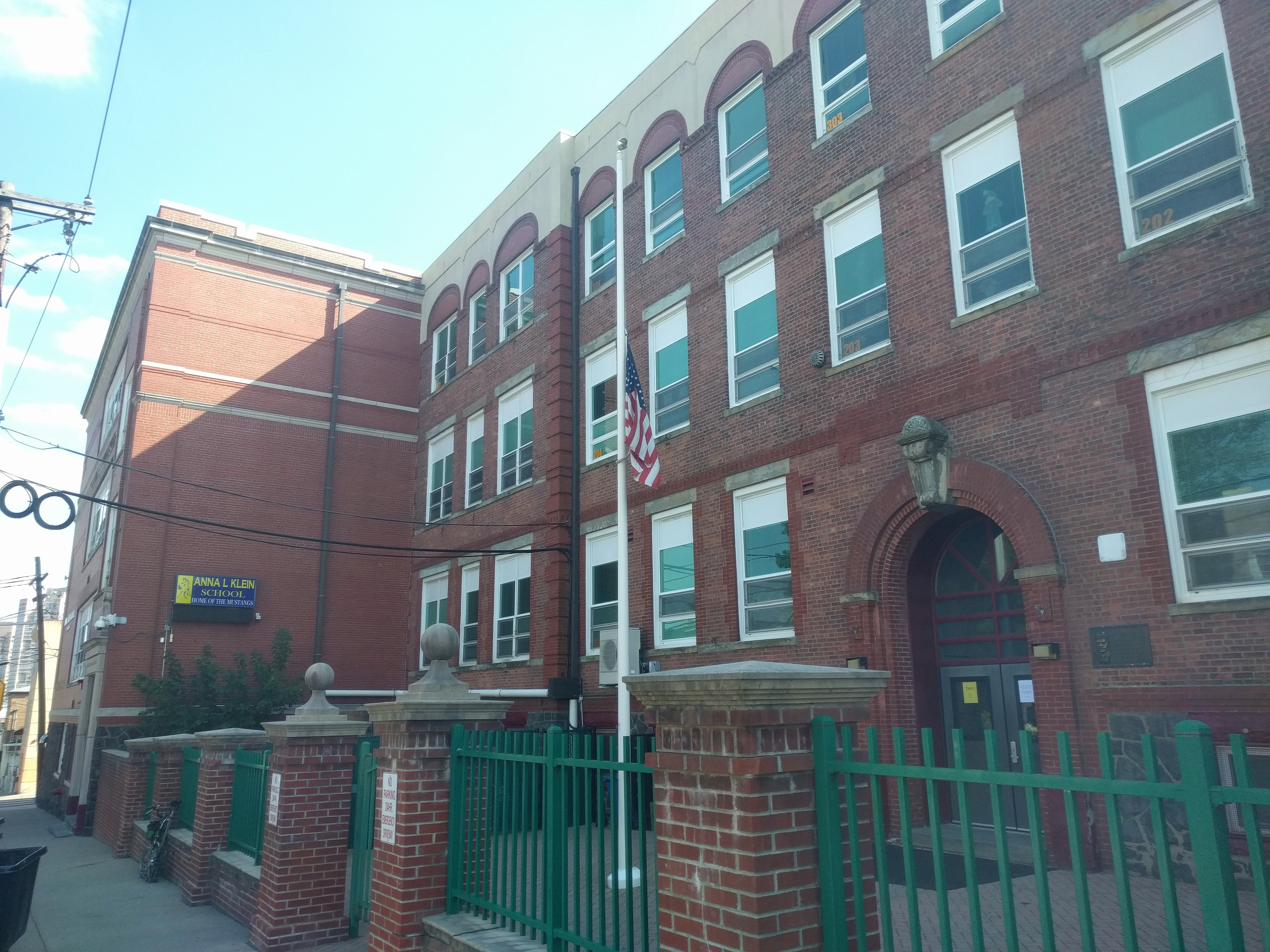
- Anna Klein School

Address
- 301 69th Street Guttenberg, Hudson County, New Jersey, 07093; United States
- Coordinates: 40.793827°N 74.008005°W

District information
- Grades: Pre-K to 8
- Superintendent: Michelle Rosenberg
- Business administrator: Jolene Mantineo
- Schools: 1

Students and staff
- Enrollment: 959 (as of 2022–23)
- Faculty: 87.0 FTEs
- Student–teacher ratio: 11.0:1

Other information
- District Factor Group: B
- Website: www.alkschool.org
Ind.	Per pupil	District spending	Rank (*)	K-8 average	%± vs. average
1A	Total Spending	$12,914	1	$18,891	−31.6%
1	Budgetary Cost	10,825	6	14,159	−23.5%
2	Classroom Instruction	6,491	4	8,659	−25.0%
6	Support Services	1,938	33	2,167	−10.6%
8	Administrative Cost	1,246	10	1,547	−19.5%
10	Operations & Maintenance	1,021	4	1,612	−36.7%
13	Extracurricular Activities	56	13	104	−46.2%
16	Median Teacher Salary	53,361	8	61,136
Data from NJDoE 2014 Taxpayers' Guide to Education Spending. *Of K-8 districts with more than 750 students. Lowest spending=1; Highest=84

The Guttenberg Public School District is a community public school district that serves students in pre-kindergarten through eighth grade from Guttenberg, in the U.S. state of New Jersey.

As of the 2022–23 school year, the district, comprised of one school, had an enrollment of 959 students and 87.0 classroom teachers (on an FTE basis), for a student–teacher ratio of 11.0:1.

The district is classified by the New Jersey Department of Education as being in District Factor Group "B", the second-lowest of eight groupings. District Factor Groups organize districts statewide to allow comparison by common socioeconomic characteristics of the local districts. From lowest socioeconomic status to highest, the categories are A, B, CD, DE, FG, GH, I and J. Guttenberg, however, is not an Abbott district and therefore does not receive nearly as much state aid as any of the Abbotts do.

For ninth through twelfth grades, public school students attend North Bergen High School in North Bergen, as part of a sending/receiving relationship with the North Bergen School District. As of the 2021–22 school year, the high school had an enrollment of 2,316 students and 164.6 classroom teachers (on an FTE basis), for a student–teacher ratio of 14.1:1.

== School ==
Anna L. Klein School had an enrollment of 912 public school students in grades PreK-8 in the 2021–22 school year.

- Keith Petry, principal

== Administration ==
Core members of the district's administration are:

- Michelle Rosenberg, superintendent
- Jolene Mantineo, business administrator / board secretary

== Board of education ==
The district's board of education, comprised of nine members, sets policy and oversees the fiscal and educational operation of the district through its administration. As a Type II school district, the board's trustees are elected directly by voters to serve three-year terms of office on a staggered basis, with three seats up for election each year held (since 2012) as part of the November general election. The board appoints a superintendent to oversee the district's day-to-day operations and a business administrator to supervise the business functions of the district.
