= Guttenberg, New Jersey =

Town in Hudson County, New Jersey, US

- Town
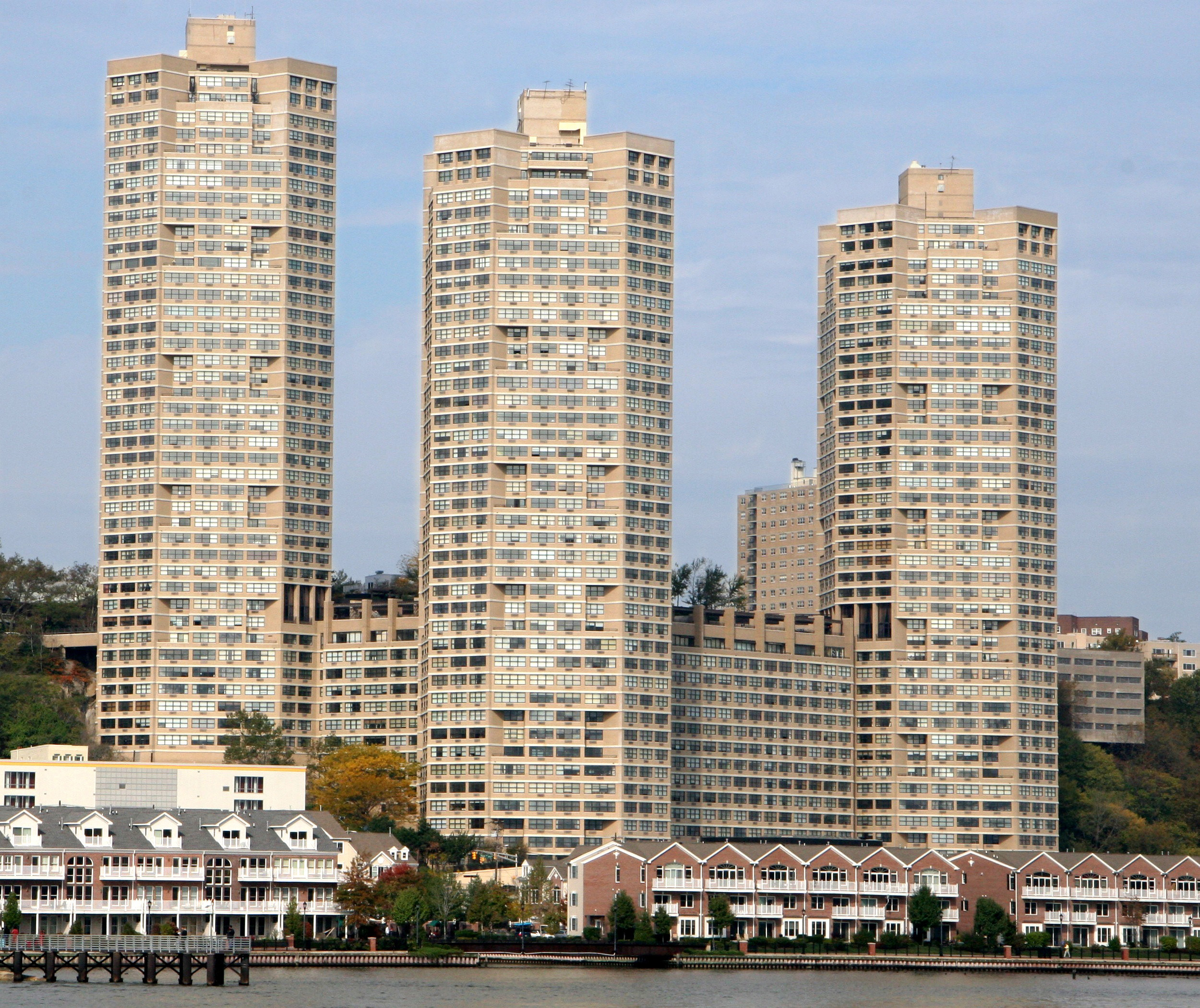
- The Galaxy Towers from the Hudson River

- Seal
- Interactive map of Guttenberg, New Jersey
- Location in Hudson County Location in New Jersey Location in the United States
- Coordinates: 40.792784°N 74.004572°W
- Country: United States
- State: New Jersey
- County: Hudson
- Incorporated: March 9, 1859
- Named for: Johannes Gutenberg

Government
  - Type: Town
  - Body: Town Council
  - Mayor: Wayne D. Zitt Jr. (D, term ends December 31, 2029)
  - Municipal clerk: Cosmo A. Cirillo

Area
  - Total: 0.24 sq mi (0.62 km^{2})
  - Land: 0.19 sq mi (0.50 km^{2})
  - Water: 0.046 sq mi (0.12 km^{2}) 20.00%
  - Rank: 557th of 565 in state 11th of 12 in county
- Elevation: 194 ft (59 m)

Population (2020)
  - Total: 12,017
  - Estimate (2023): 11,365
  - Rank: 211th of 565 in state 11th of 12 in county
  - Density: 62,264.2/sq mi (24,040.3/km^{2})
  - Rank: 1st of 565 in state 1st of 12 in county
- Time zone: UTC−05:00 (Eastern (EST))
  - Summer (DST): UTC−04:00 (Eastern (EDT))
- ZIP Code: 07093
- Area code: 201
- FIPS code: 3401728650
- GNIS feature ID: 0885235
- Website: www.guttenbergnj.org

Guttenberg (/ˈɡʌtənbɜːrɡ/ GUT-ən-burg) is a town in the northern part of Hudson County, in the U.S. state of New Jersey. In the 2020 Census, it was the most densely populated incorporated municipality in the United States, as well as one of the most densely populated municipalities worldwide, with 57,116 inhabitants per square mile (22,053/km^{2}) of land area. Only four blocks wide north to south, Guttenberg has been variously ranked as the ninth-smallest municipality in the state (based on data from the U.S. Census Bureau) or as the state's seventh-smallest municipality (based on data from the New Jersey Department of Environmental Protection).

As of the 2020 United States census, the town's population was 12,017, an increase of 841 (+7.5%) from the 2010 census count of 11,176, which in turn reflected an increase of 369 (+3.4%) from the 10,807 counted in the 2000 census. As of the 2010 Census, almost one-fifth of the town's population resided in the Galaxy Towers, a trio of residential skyscrapers overlooking the Hudson River.

The current population growth and density in Guttenberg represents a significant change since 1983, when it was described by The New York Times, as "an old community of two-story row houses, small stores and light industry." Based on data from the 2017 Population Estimates Program showing that the town had a population density of 58,800 inhabitants per square mile (22,700/km^{2}), the highest in the state, Dave Sheingold of Northjersey.com described Guttenberg as "America's most crowded place".

== History ==
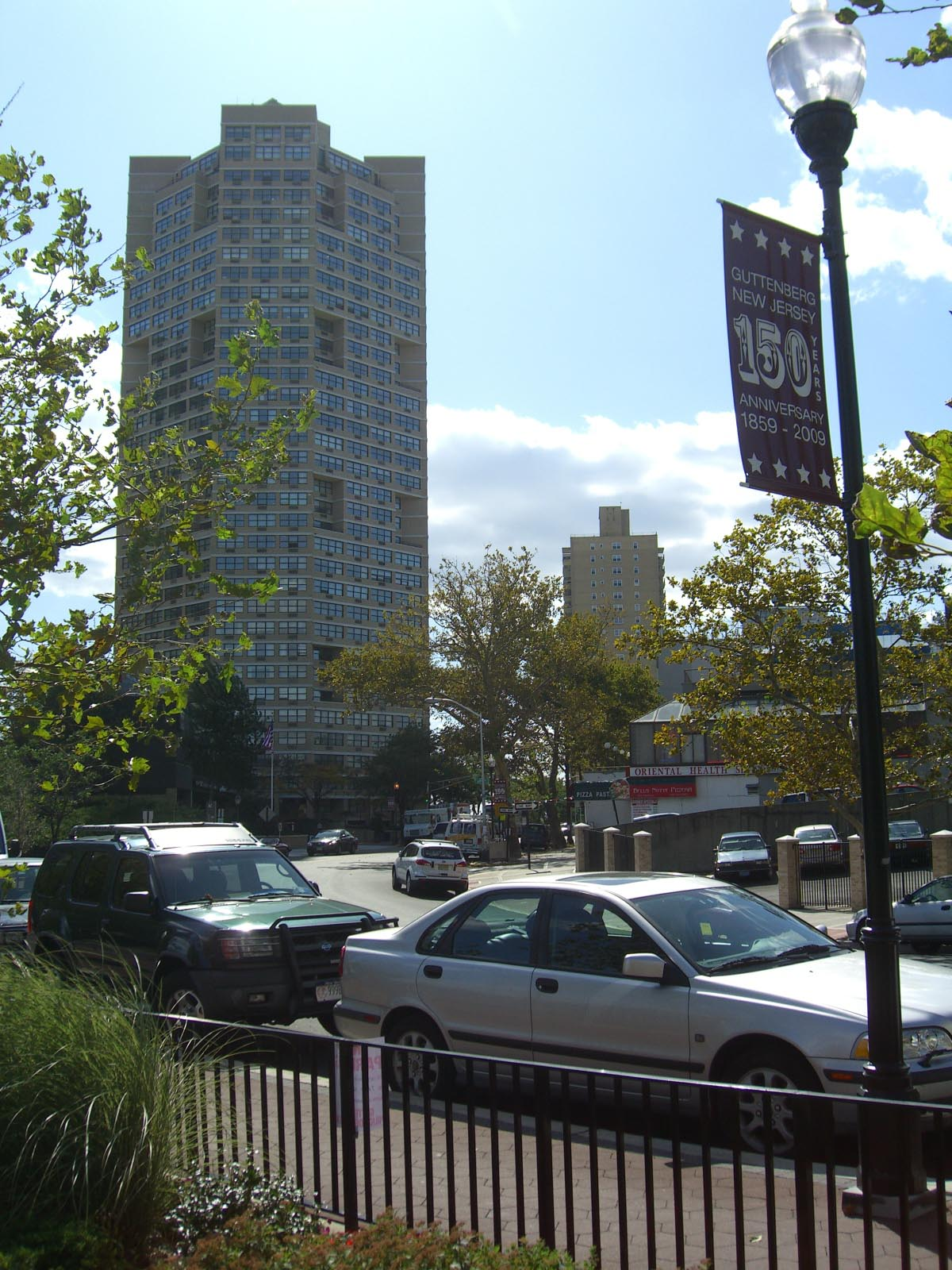
A 2009 sign on Boulevard East advertising the town's 150th anniversary. In the background is one of the three towers of the Galaxy apartments.

Guttenberg was formerly a farm owned by William Cooper, sold in 1853 to a group of New Yorkers, who had formed the Weehawken Land and Ferry Association. Like nearby Union Hill, it was subdivided and lots were sold mostly to Germans. The company ran two ferries, the Hultz and the Flora, which crossed the Hudson from the landings at the foot of Bulls Ferry Road, Pleasant Valley, Fort Lee, and Spring Street in Manhattan.

Guttenberg was formed as a town on March 9, 1859, from portions of North Bergen Township, but remained as a part of the township that was not fully independent. Guttenberg became part of Union Township when it was formed on February 28, 1861, and became fully independent as of April 1, 1878. The municipality takes its name from Johannes Gutenberg, the inventor of the European version of the printing press, though other sources indicate that the name derives from "good village" in German.

Galaxy Towers, developed by Prudential Insurance Company, were built in the late 1970s on Boulevard East. The three octagonal skyscrapers rise 415 feet (126 m) and contain 1,075 apartments.

== Geography ==
Guttenberg is located atop the Hudson Palisades, south of Woodcliff and the Racetrack Section in North Bergen and north of West New York. To the east the town shares a border the New York City borough of Manhattan (Upper West Side) in the Hudson River. Its western border is Kennedy Boulevard. Bergenline Avenue, the commercial corridor of North Hudson, runs north and south through the town, and is the heart of "Havana on the Hudson".

According to the United States Census Bureau, the town had a total area of 0.24 square miles (0.62 km^{2}), including 0.19 square miles (0.50 km^{2}) of land and 0.05 square miles (0.12 km^{2}) of water (20.00%). The town is four blocks long, and takes less than a minute to drive through.

== Demographics ==
Historical population
| Census | Pop. | Note | %± |
|---|---|---|---|
| 1880 | 1,206 | | — |
| 1890 | 1,927 | | 59.8% |
| 1900 | 3,825 | | 98.5% |
| 1910 | 5,647 | | 47.6% |
| 1920 | 6,726 | | 19.1% |
| 1930 | 6,535 | | −2.8% |
| 1940 | 6,200 | | −5.1% |
| 1950 | 5,566 | | −10.2% |
| 1960 | 5,118 | | −8.0% |
| 1970 | 5,754 | | 12.4% |
| 1980 | 7,340 | | 27.6% |
| 1990 | 8,268 | | 12.6% |
| 2000 | 10,807 | | 30.7% |
| 2010 | 11,176 | | 3.4% |
| 2020 | 12,017 | | 7.5% |
| 2023 (est.) | 11,365 | ▼ | −5.4% |
Population sources: 1880–1920 1880–1890; 1890–1910 1910–1930; 1940–2000 2000; 2010 2020

=== Racial and ethnic composition ===
Guttenberg town, New Jersey – Racial and ethnic composition Note: the US Census treats Hispanic/Latino as an ethnic category. This table excludes Latinos from the racial categories and assigns them to a separate category. Hispanics/Latinos may be of any race.
| Race / Ethnicity (NH = Non-Hispanic) | Pop 2000 | Pop 2010 | Pop 2020 | % 2000 | % 2010 | % 2020 |
|---|---|---|---|---|---|---|
| White alone (NH) | 3,485 | 2,622 | 2,426 | 32.25% | 23.46% | 20.19% |
| Black or African American alone (NH) | 307 | 330 | 343 | 2.84% | 2.95% | 2.85% |
| Native American or Alaska Native alone (NH) | 7 | 13 | 7 | 0.06% | 0.12% | 0.06% |
| Asian alone (NH) | 779 | 803 | 1,064 | 7.21% | 7.19% | 8.85% |
| Native Hawaiian or Pacific Islander alone (NH) | 1 | 4 | 3 | 0.01% | 0.04% | 0.02% |
| Other race alone (NH) | 39 | 52 | 122 | 0.36% | 0.47% | 1.02% |
| Mixed race or Multiracial (NH) | 318 | 107 | 184 | 2.94% | 0.96% | 1.53% |
| Hispanic or Latino (any race) | 5,871 | 7,245 | 7,868 | 54.33% | 64.83% | 65.47% |
| Total | 10,807 | 11,176 | 12,017 | 100.00% | 100.00% | 100.00% |

=== 2020 census ===
As of the 2020 census, Guttenberg had a population of 12,017. The median age was 38.1 years. 20.2% of residents were under the age of 18 and 14.3% of residents were 65 years of age or older. For every 100 females there were 94.5 males, and for every 100 females age 18 and over there were 92.9 males age 18 and over.

100.0% of residents lived in urban areas, while 0.0% lived in rural areas.

There were 4,920 households in Guttenberg, of which 29.5% had children under the age of 18 living in them. Of all households, 35.7% were married-couple households, 23.1% were households with a male householder and no spouse or partner present, and 33.8% were households with a female householder and no spouse or partner present. About 31.3% of all households were made up of individuals and 11.1% had someone living alone who was 65 years of age or older.

There were 5,142 housing units, of which 4.3% were vacant. The homeowner vacancy rate was 1.2% and the rental vacancy rate was 2.6%.

The census counted 4,149 residents (34.5%) who were not Hispanic or Latino.

=== 2010 census ===
The 2010 United States census counted 11,176 people, 4,473 households, and 2,684 families in the town. The population density was 57,116.0 per square mile (22,052.6/km^{2}). There were 4,839 housing units at an average density of 24,730.2 per square mile (9,548.4/km^{2}). The racial makeup was 67.44% (7,537) White, 4.80% (537) Black or African American, 0.91% (102) Native American, 7.32% (818) Asian, 0.04% (4) Pacific Islander, 14.25% (1,593) from other races, and 5.23% (585) from two or more races. Hispanic or Latino of any race were 64.83% (7,245) of the population.

Of the 4,473 households, 27.5% had children under the age of 18; 37.6% were married couples living together; 15.4% had a female householder with no husband present and 40.0% were non-families. Of all households, 32.5% were made up of individuals and 9.5% had someone living alone who was 65 years of age or older. The average household size was 2.48 and the average family size was 3.12.

20.5% of the population were under the age of 18, 8.6% from 18 to 24, 34.7% from 25 to 44, 24.9% from 45 to 64, and 11.3% who were 65 years of age or older. The median age was 36.4 years. For every 100 females, the population had 95.4 males. For every 100 females ages 18 and older there were 93.0 males.

The Census Bureau's 2006–2010 American Community Survey showed that (in 2010 inflation-adjusted dollars) median household income was $49,981 (with a margin of error of +/− $8,219) and the median family income was $53,945 (+/− $9,457). Males had a median income of $50,227 (+/− $8,459) versus $32,089 (+/− $6,483) for females. The per capita income for the borough was $33,239 (+/− $8,416). About 14.8% of families and 16.0% of the population were below the poverty line, including 28.7% of those under age 18 and 11.8% of those age 65 or over.

=== 2000 census ===
As of the 2000 United States census there were 10,807 people, 4,493 households, and 2,619 families residing in the town. The population density was 56,012.0 inhabitants per square mile (21,961.1/km^{2}; 87.5 per acre), making it the most densely populated municipality in The United States, with over twice the density of New York City. There were 4,650 housing units at an average density of 24,100.7 per square mile (9,305.3/km^{2}). The racial makeup of the town was 64.98% White, 3.81% African American, 0.38% Native American, 7.30% Asian, 0.01% Pacific Islander, 16.42% from other races, and 7.10% from two or more races. Hispanic or Latino of any race were 54.33% of the population.

There were 4,493 households, out of which 27.8% had children under the age of 18 living with them, 40.3% were married couples living together, 13.0% had a female householder with no husband present, and 41.7% were non-families. 35.1% of all households were made up of individuals, and 10.0% had someone living alone who was 65 years of age or older. The average household size was 2.38 and the average family size was 3.13.

In the town, the population was spread out, with 21.2% under the age of 18, 8.7% from 18 to 24, 36.9% from 25 to 44, 21.4% from 45 to 64, and 11.8% who were 65 years of age or older. The median age was 36 years. For every 100 females, there were 92.9 males. For every 100 females age 18 and over, there were 90.6 males.

The median income for a household in the town was $44,515, and the median income for a family was $47,440. Males had a median income of $38,628 versus $33,154 for females. The per capita income for the town was $27,931. About 11.1% of families and 13.0% of the population were below the poverty line, including 18.7% of those under age 18 and 10.9% of those age 65 or over.

The town is a bedroom community with about 36% of its employed residents working in New York City, including 1,648 of the 4,993 Guttenberg residents in the workforce who commute to employment in Manhattan as of the 2000 Census.

== Economy ==
Portions of the town are part of an Urban Enterprise Zone (UEZ), one of 32 zones covering 37 municipalities statewide. Guttenberg was selected in 1996 as one of a group of seven zones added to participate in the program. In addition to other benefits to encourage employment and investment within the UEZ, shoppers can take advantage of a reduced 3.3125% sales tax rate (half of the 6 5/8% rate charged statewide) at eligible merchants. Established in May 1996, the city's Urban Enterprise Zone status expires in May 2027. Areas included in the Guttenberg UEZ are:

- Bergenline Avenue – 68th Street to 71st Street
- Park Avenue – 68th Street to 71st Street
- 70th Street – Park Avenue to Bergenline Avenue
- 69th Street – Park Avenue to Boulevard East
- 69th Street to 71st Street – Boulevard East
- 70th Street to 71st Street – Broadway

== Government ==
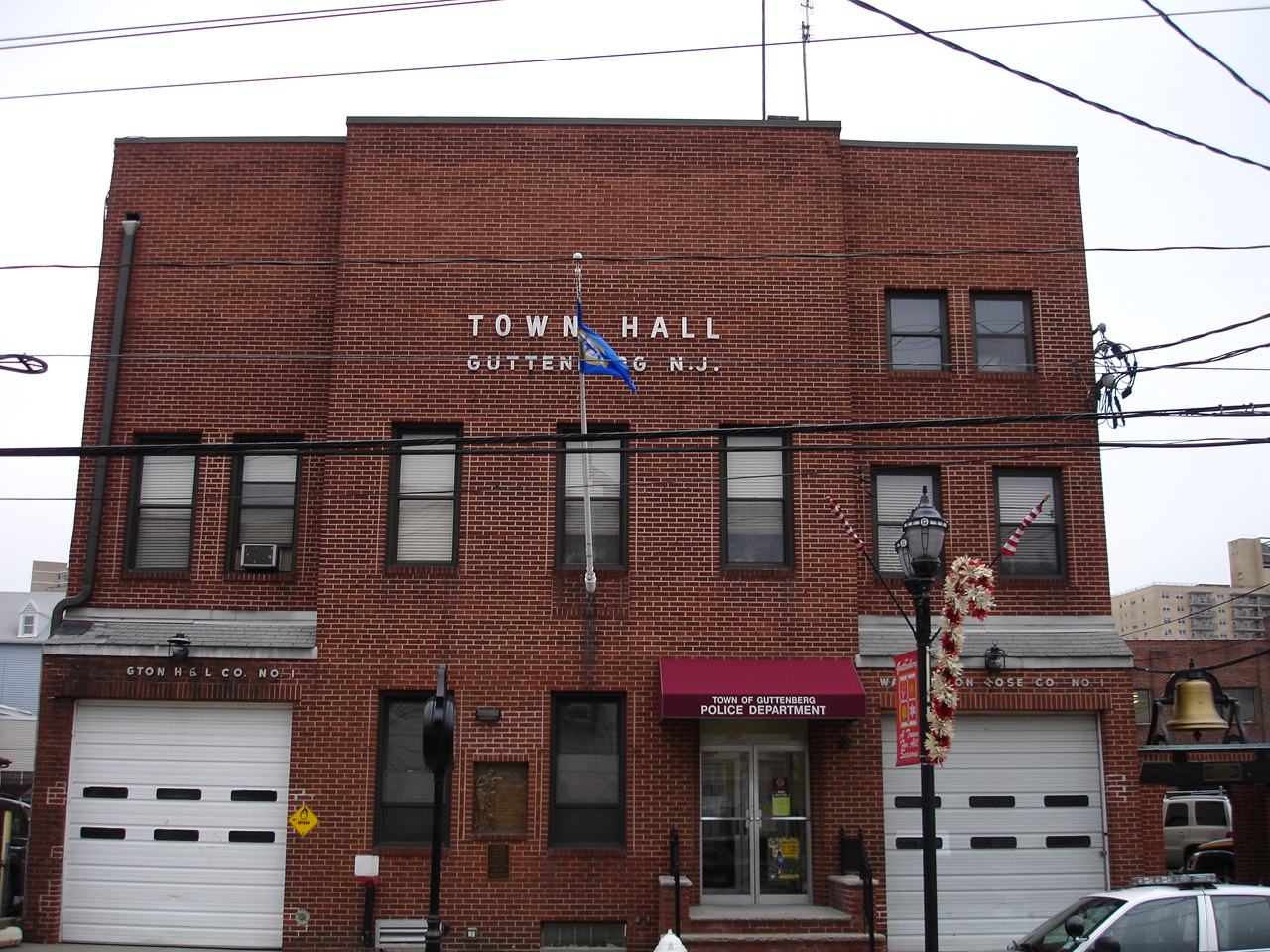
The town hall of Guttenberg

=== Local government ===
Guttenberg operates under the Town form of New Jersey municipal government. The town is one of nine municipalities (of the 564) statewide that use this traditional form of government. The governing body is comprised of the Mayor and the five-member Township Council, all elected at-large on a partisan basis as part of the November general election. The mayor is elected directly by the voters. Town council members are elected to four-year terms on a staggered basis, with two seats up for election in one year and three seats together with the mayoral seat up for election in the following year, followed by two years with no elections.

As of 2025, the Mayor of Guttenberg is Democrat Wayne D. Zitt Jr., whose term of office ends December 31, 2025. Members of the Town Council are Richard Delafuente (D, 2025), Monica Fundora (D, 2025), John D. Habermann (D, 2025), William Hokien (D, 2026) and Juana Malave (D, 2026).

In December 2015, Wayne Zitt was selected from three candidates nominated by the Democratic municipal committee to fill the vacant seat expiring in December 2017 of Efrain Velez, who resigned earlier that month.

==== Political scandals ====
Political scandals in the 21st century have included the 2008 convictions of then-mayor David Delle Donna and his wife, a member of the town planning board, on federal extortion and mail fraud charges, for which they were each sentenced to four years in federal prison. A former mayor, Peter LaVilla, pleaded guilty in 2003 to misappropriating campaign funds and using the money for a private brokerage account. In addition, a councilman resigned in 2002 after being accused of receiving illegal advances on his salary, and the same year, a chief financial officer pleaded guilty to misappropriation of funds.

==== Public safety ====
Guttenberg is served by North Hudson Regional Fire and Rescue, a regional fire department established in 1999 serving communities in northern Hudson County, that also serves North Bergen, Union City, Weehawken and West New York, replacing the five independent departments that had served each of the communities.

=== Federal, state and county representation ===
Guttenberg is located in the 8th Congressional District and is part of New Jersey's 33rd state legislative district.

For the 119th United States Congress, New Jersey's 8th congressional district is represented by Rob Menendez (D, Jersey City). New Jersey is represented in the United States Senate by Democrats Cory Booker (Newark, term ends 2027) and Andy Kim (Moorestown, term ends 2031).

For the 2026–2027 session, the 33rd legislative district of the New Jersey Legislature is represented in the State Senate by Brian P. Stack (D, Union City) and in the General Assembly by Gabe Rodriguez (D, West New York) and Larry Wainstein (D, North Bergen).

Hudson County is governed by the directly elected Hudson County Executive and by a Board of County Commissioners, which serves as the county's legislative body. As of 2025, Hudson County's Hudson County Executive is Craig Guy (D, Jersey City), whose term of office expires December 31, 2027. Hudson County's Commissioners are Kenneth Kopacz (D, District 1 - Bayonne and parts of Jersey City; 2026, Bayonne), William O'Dea (D, District 2 - Western Jersey City; 2026, Jersey City), Vice Chair Jerry Walker (D, District 3 - South Eastern Jersey City Yraida Aponte-Lipski (D, District 4 - North Eastern Jersey City; 2026, Jersey City), Chair Anthony L. Romano Jr. (D, District 5 - Hoboken and parts of Jersey City; 2026, Hoboken), Fanny J. Cedeño (D, District 6 - Union City; 2026, Union City), Caridad Rodriguez (D, District 7 - Weehawken, West New York, and Gutenberg; 2026, West New York), Robert Bascelice (D, District 8 - West New York, North Bergen, Secaucus; 2026, North Bergen) and Albert J. Cifelli (D, District 9 - Secaucus, Kearny, East Newark, Harrison; 2026, Harrison)

Hudson County's constitutional officers are County Clerk E. Junior Maldonado (D, Jersey City, 2027), Register Jeffrey Dublin (D, Jersey City, 2026) Sheriff Frank X. Schillari (R, Jersey City, 2025) and Surrogate Tilo E. Rivas (D, Jersey City, 2029)

Gubernatorial election results for Guttenberg
| Year | Republican | | Democratic | | Third party(ies) | |
| Year | No. | % | No. | % | No. | % |
|---|---|---|---|---|---|---|
| 2025 | 600 | 22.83% | 1,988 | 75.65% | 40 | 1.52% |
| 2021 | 400 | 21.30% | 1,475 | 78.54% | 3 | 0.16% |
| 2017 | 286 | 17.30% | 1,341 | 81.13% | 26 | 1.57% |
| 2013 | 645 | 45.74% | 740 | 52.48% | 25 | 1.77% |
| 2009 | 447 | 24.21% | 1,341 | 72.64% | 58 | 3.14% |
| 2005 | 475 | 24.50% | 1,435 | 74.01% | 29 | 1.50% |

=== Politics ===
Presidential Elections Results
| Year | Republican | Democratic | Third Parties |
|---|---|---|---|
| 2024 | 38.5% 1,290 | 58.8% 1,971 | 2.7% 74 |
| 2020 | 29.1% 1,090 | 70.2% 2,634 | 0.7% 26 |
| 2016 | 21.9% 749 | 75.2% 2,574 | 2.9% 92 |
| 2012 | 21.4% 692 | 77.4% 2,507 | 1.2% 41 |
| 2008 | 26.5% 928 | 71.2% 2,524 | 2.3% 45 |
| 2004 | 32.1% 1,035 | 67.3% 2,172 | 0.6% 19 |

United States Senate election results for Guttenberg1
| Year | Republican | | Democratic | | Third party(ies) | |
| Year | No. | % | No. | % | No. | % |
|---|---|---|---|---|---|---|
| 2024 | 1,013 | 34.04% | 1,843 | 61.93% | 120 | 4.03% |
| 2018 | 558 | 20.75% | 2,046 | 76.09% | 85 | 3.16% |
| 2012 | 500 | 17.12% | 2,366 | 81.03% | 54 | 1.85% |
| 2006 | 473 | 22.82% | 1,580 | 76.22% | 20 | 0.96% |

United States Senate election results for Guttenberg2
| Year | Republican | | Democratic | | Third party(ies) | |
| Year | No. | % | No. | % | No. | % |
|---|---|---|---|---|---|---|
| 2020 | 927 | 25.87% | 2,572 | 71.78% | 84 | 2.34% |
| 2014 | 308 | 22.78% | 1,014 | 75.00% | 30 | 2.22% |
| 2013 | 213 | 22.00% | 737 | 76.14% | 18 | 1.86% |
| 2008 | 713 | 24.53% | 2,117 | 72.82% | 77 | 2.65% |

== Education ==
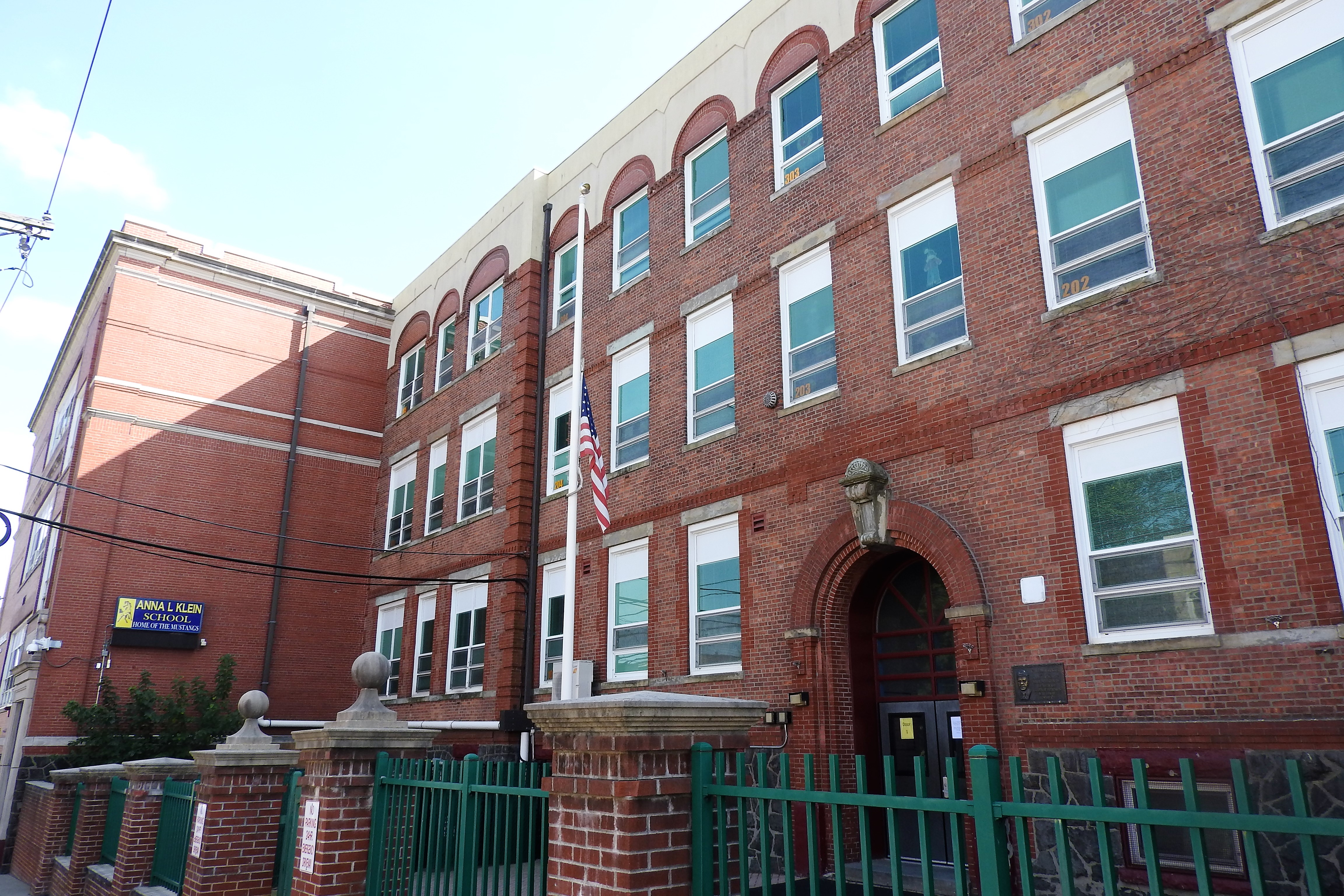
Anna L. Klein School of the Guttenberg Public School District

For pre-kindergarten through eighth grade, public school students from Guttenberg attend the Anna L. Klein School as part of the Guttenberg Public School District. As of the 2021–22 school year, the district, comprised of one school, had an enrollment of 920 students and 92.8 classroom teachers (on an FTE basis), for a student–teacher ratio of 9.9:1. The principal of Anna L. Klein School is Keith Petry.

For ninth through twelfth grades, public school students attend North Bergen High School in North Bergen, as part of a sending/receiving relationship with the North Bergen School District. As of the 2021–22 school year, the high school had an enrollment of 2,316 students and 164.6 classroom teachers (on an FTE basis), for a student–teacher ratio of 14.1:1.

== Transportation ==
=== Roads and highways ===
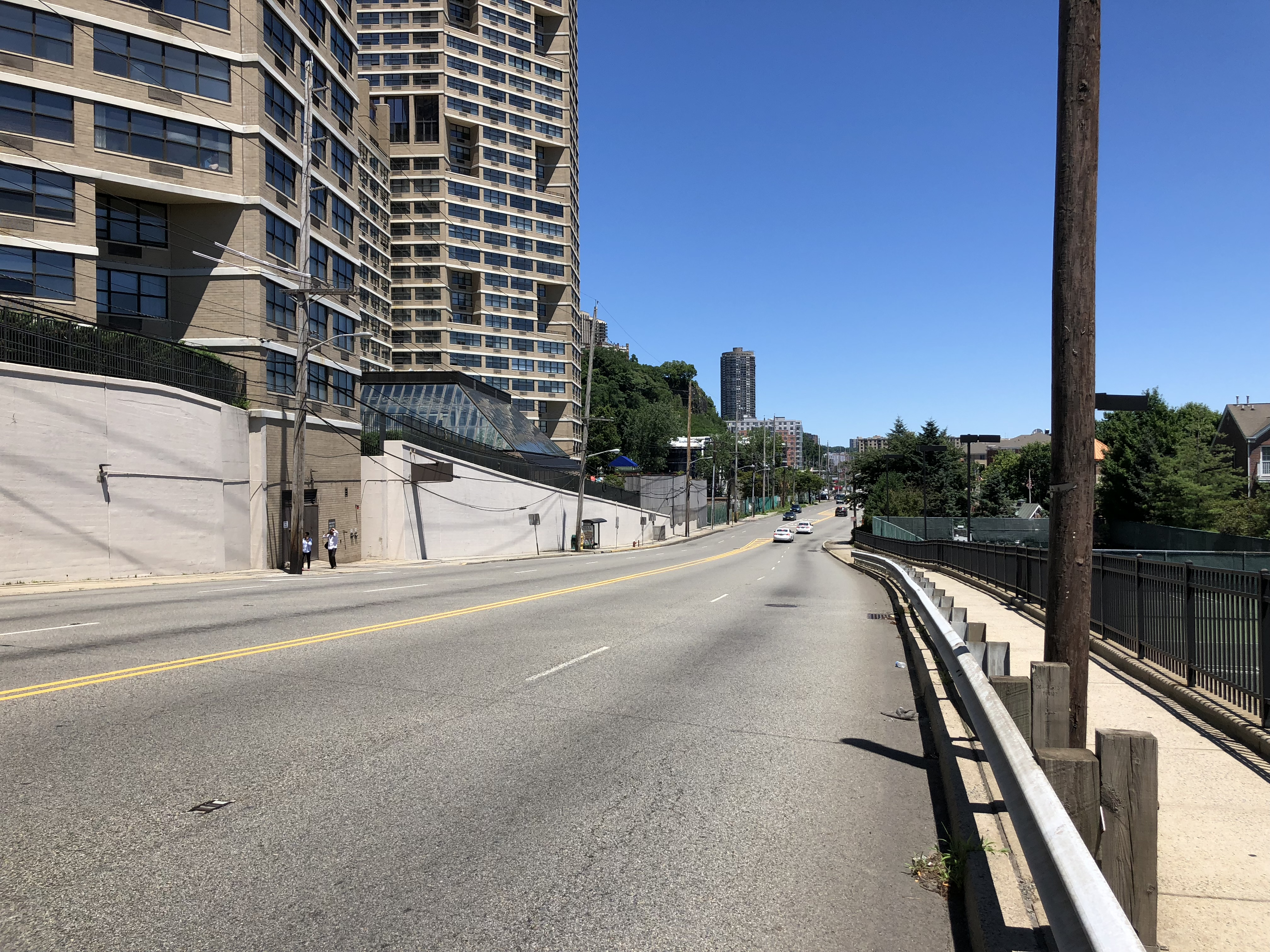
County Route 505 in Guttenberg

As of May 2010, the town had a total of 4.39 miles (7.07 km) of roadways, of which 3.95 miles (6.36 km) were maintained by the municipality and 0.44 miles (0.71 km) by Hudson County.

The only significant roads directly serving Guttenberg are county highways. County Route 501 follows Kennedy Boulevard along the town's western border. County Route 505 follows River Road on the east side of town. Both roads are oriented north–south. Boulevard East passes through the town atop the Palisades.

Interstate 95 (the New Jersey Turnpike), U.S. Route 1/9 and New Jersey Route 495 are major highways located in adjacent North Bergen.

=== Public transportation ===
NJ Transit (NJT) bus service is available to the Port Authority Bus Terminal in Midtown Manhattan and Bergen County destinations on the 128, 154, 156, 158, 159, 165, 166, 168 routes. Service north to Fort Lee and the George Washington Bridge Bus Terminal is available via the 181 and 188 routes. Hudson County local service is provided on the 22, 23, 84/86, 88 and 89 routes. NJT bus lines are augmented by privately run jitney service.

Ferry service to West Midtown Ferry Terminal in Manhattan is provided by NY Waterway. To the south, at Weehawken Port Imperial. To the north, Edgewater Landing is located on River Road at the intersection of Route 5.

== Notable people ==
People who were born in or residents of Guttenberg include:

- Troy Archer (1955–1979), defensive tackle who played three seasons in the National Football League for the New York Giants
- Steve Carell (born 1962), film and television actor, lived in Guttenberg during his time on The Daily Show
- Melissa Fumero (born 1982), actress and director known for portraying Amy Santiago on Brooklyn Nine-Nine and Adriana Cramer on One Life to Live
- Joseph Rudolph Grimes (1923–2007), politician in Liberia who served as Minister of Foreign Affairs from 1960 to 1972
- Stephen Ledogar (1929–2010), ambassador and diplomat
- William Oberhardt (1882–1958), artist, portrait painter, illustrator and sculptor
- John Scarne (1903–1985), magician and book author who was particularly adept at playing card manipulation
- Jane C. Wright (1919–2013), pioneering cancer researcher and surgeon noted for her contributions to chemotherapy
