= Kyle Gurrieri =

American soccer player

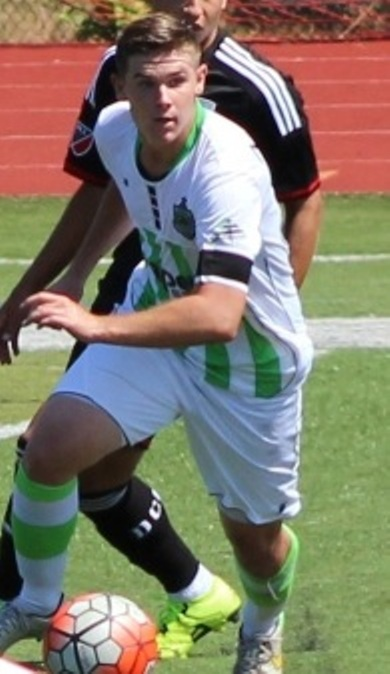
- 2015

Personal information
- Date of birth: March 10, 1998 (age 28)
- Place of birth: Totowa, New Jersey, United States
- Height: 5 ft 9 in (1.75 m)
- Position: Center midfielder

Team information
- Current team: South Carolina Gamecocks
- Number: 6

Youth career
- 2013–2015: New Jersey Cedar Stars Academy

College career
Years	Team	Apps	(Gls)
2016	Syracuse Orange	6	(0)
2018–2021	South Carolina Gamecocks	12	(1)

Senior career*
Years	Team	Apps	(Gls)
2015–2016	Wilmington Hammerheads	1	(0)
2017	Nordvärmland FF		
2018	Ocean City Nor'easters	10	(0)

International career
2013–2014	United States U17	3	(0)
- * Club domestic league appearances and goals as of April 22, 2021

Kyle Gurrieri (born March 10, 1998) is an American soccer player who played for the South Carolina Gamecocks.

Gurrieri grew up in Totowa, New Jersey, and attended Passaic Valley Regional High School, transferring out after his freshman year to join the U.S. Soccer U17 Residency Program in Bradenton, Florida starting in September 2013.

== Club career ==
A former member of the US U17 National Team Residency program in Bradenton, Florida, he has represented the United States U14, U15, and U17 National Teams.

He was named to the 2015 National Soccer Coaches Association of America (NSCAA) All-American Team

Before attending College, Gurrieri signed an amateur contract for a two-month stint with United Soccer League side Wilmington Hammerheads on July 16, 2015.
