= North Bergen High School =

High school in Hudson County, New Jersey, US

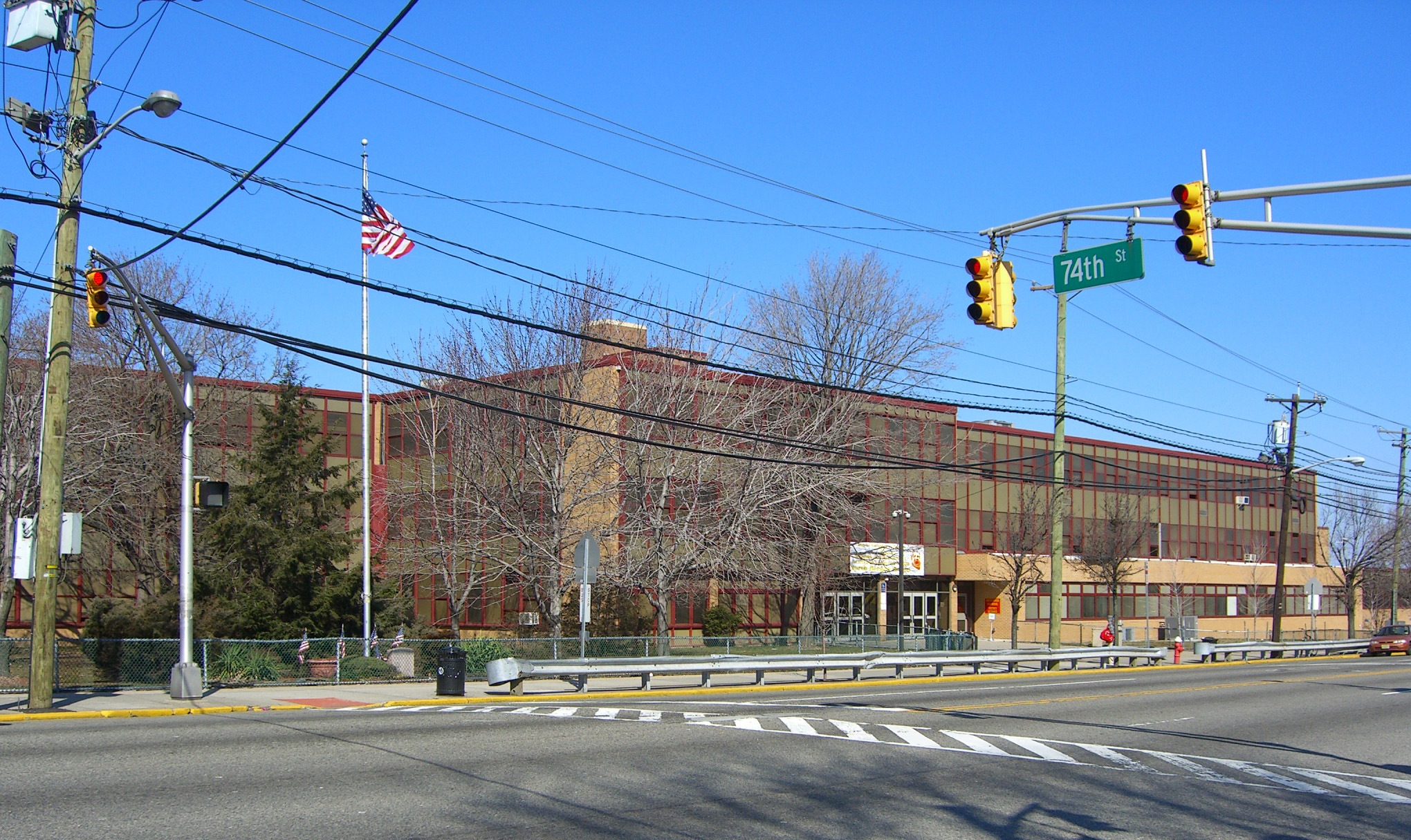

Location
- 7417 Kennedy Boulevard; North Bergen, Hudson County, New Jersey 07047; United States; 40.79435°N 73.999734°W

Information
- Type: Public high school
- Established: September 1961
- School district: North Bergen School District
- NCES School ID: 341146002882
- Principal: Richard Locricchio
- Faculty: 158.2 FTEs
- Grades: 9-12
- Enrollment: 2,328 (as of 2024–25)
- Student to teacher ratio: 14.7:1
- Colors: Scarlet and Gold
- Athletics conference: Hudson County Interscholastic League (general); North Jersey Super Football Conference (football)
- Team name: Bruins
- Rival: Union City High School
- Website: nbhs.northbergen.k12.nj.us

North Bergen High School is a four-year comprehensive public high school, serving students in ninth through twelfth grade from North Bergen, in Hudson County, in the U.S. state of New Jersey, operating as part of the North Bergen School District. The school is the district's only high school, and its student body includes residents of both North Bergen and Guttenberg. The school offers various clubs and activities, academic programs, and sports. In 2019, the school play attracted national attention, while the athletics department holds several state titles in multiple sports.

Students from Guttenberg attend the school as part of a sending/receiving relationship with the Guttenberg Public School District.

As of the 2024–25 school year, the school had an enrollment of 2,328 students and 158.2 classroom teachers (on an FTE basis), for a student–teacher ratio of 14.7:1. There were 1,402 students (60.2% of enrollment) eligible for free lunch and 137 (5.9% of students) eligible for reduced-cost lunch.

== History ==
Before the school opened, students from North Bergen had been sent to attend Cliffside Park High School as part of a sending/receiving relationship.

The high school opened in September 1961 with Joe Coviello as its first principal and football coach. In the program's first football game, the team defeated St. Cecilia High School by a score of 14-0.

In terms of state aid, North Bergen High School was the most underfunded school in New Jersey, according to a 2014 report from the Education Law Center, receiving $24 million less than the school would be entitled to if it were fully funded under the formula specified by the School Funding Reform Act.

In 2019, the school's production of Alien went viral due to its realistic set and costumes made from recycled materials under a low, self-funded budget. The screenplay was adapted by an English teacher, who also served as director, while an art teacher directed the set and costuming and a music teacher added knowledge of stage lighting. Images and videos from the performances attracted celebrity attention including that of Sigourney Weaver, who played the protagonist of the original film. Ridley Scott's production company, Scott Free, donated $5000 to allow the school to perform an encore. Weaver visited the cast and crew for their encore performance on April 26, 2019. The New York Conservatory for Dramatic Arts gave scholarships to all students involved.

=== Curriculum ===
The school provides Advanced Placement course work and exams. The AP participation rate is 9%.

=== Awards, recognition and rankings ===
North Bergen High School was recognized as a "Benchmark Public High School for Academic Achievement" by the Business Coalition for Education Excellence, for the years 2005, 2006 and 2007.

The school was the 286th-ranked public high school in New Jersey out of 339 schools statewide in New Jersey Monthly magazine's September 2014 cover story on the state's "Top Public High Schools", using a new ranking methodology. The school had been ranked 322nd in the state of 328 schools in 2012, after being ranked 296th in 2010 out of 322 schools listed. The magazine ranked the school 294th in 2008 out of 316 schools. The school was ranked 285th in the magazine's September 2006 issue, which surveyed 316 schools across the state.

Schooldigger.com ranked the school 198th out of 376 public high schools statewide in its 2010 rankings (a decrease of 39 positions from the 2009 rank) which were based on the combined percentage of students classified as proficient or above proficient on the language arts literacy and mathematics components of the High School Proficiency Assessment (HSPA).

In 2014 U.S. News & World Report magazine awarded a bronze medal to North Bergen High School, recognizing it as one of New Jersey's best public high schools, based on criteria such as test scores, student demographics, college readiness and faculty-student ratio. Superintendent Dr. George Solter stated that the school was awarded the medal specifically for it emphasis on reading skills, the dedication of its faculty, and the talent of its students.

== Athletics ==
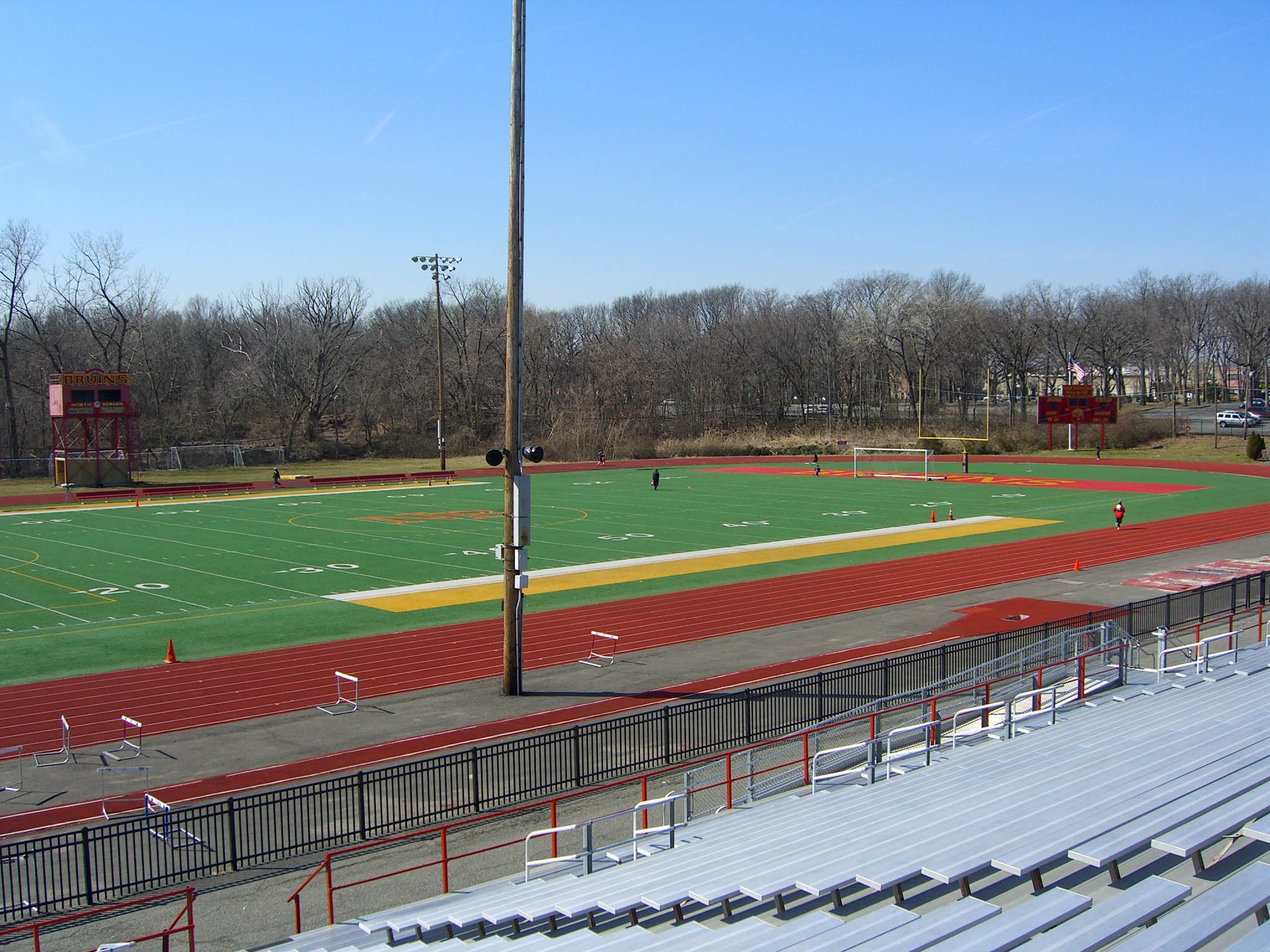
The school uses Bruins Stadium in nearby Braddock Park as its home field.

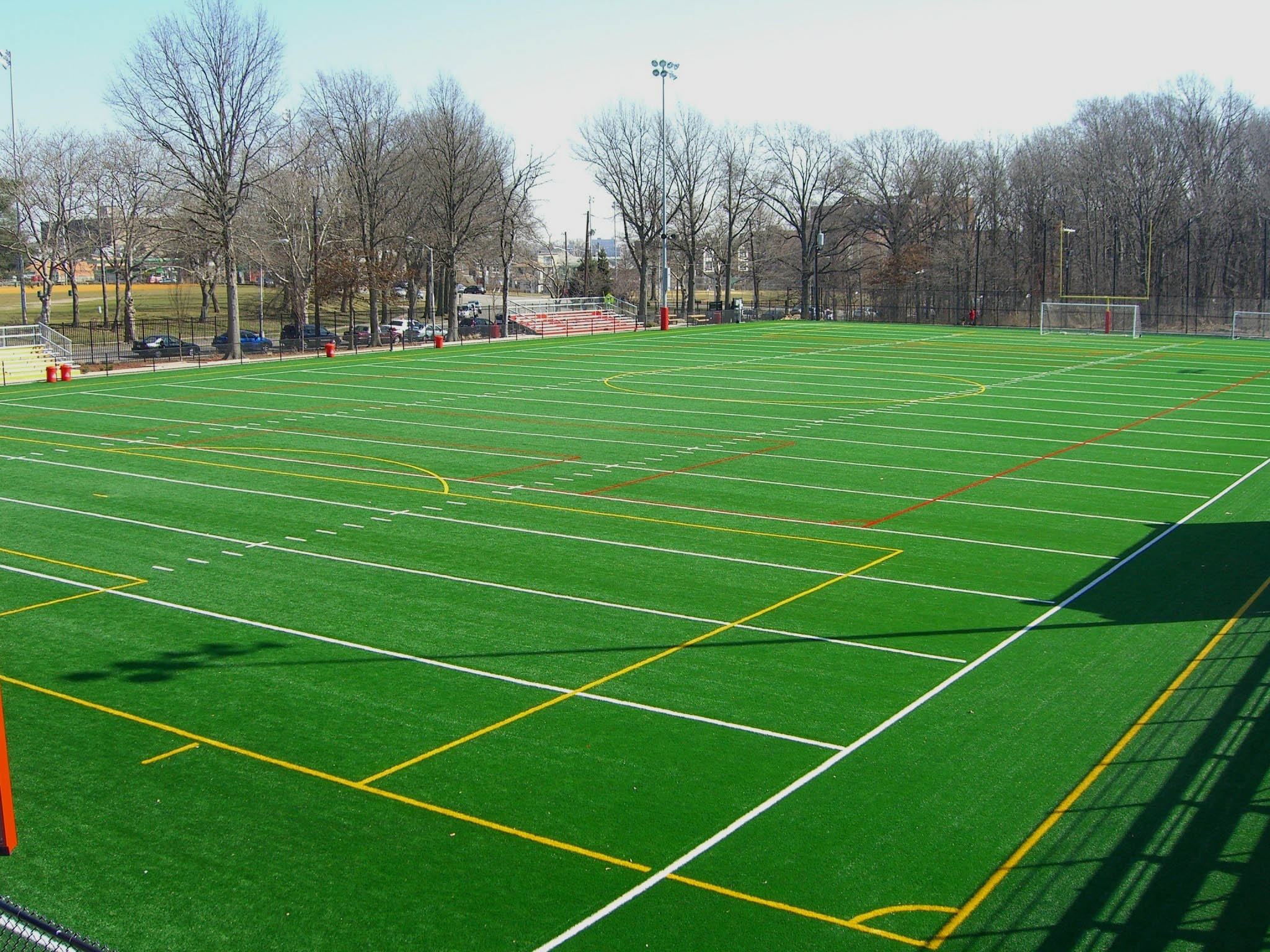
The soccer field at Bruins Stadium

The North Bergen Bruins compete in the Hudson County Interscholastic League, which is comprised of public and private high schools in Hudson County and operates under the supervision of the New Jersey State Interscholastic Athletic Association (NJSIAA). With 1,852 students in grades 10-12, the school was classified by the NJSIAA for the 2019–20 school year as Group IV for most athletic competition purposes, which included schools with an enrollment of 1,060 to 5,049 students in that grade range. The football team competes in the Liberty Red division of the North Jersey Super Football Conference, which includes 112 schools competing in 20 divisions, making it the nation's biggest football-only high school sports league. The school was classified by the NJSIAA as Group V North for football for 2024–2026, which included schools with 1,317 to 5,409 students. The North Bergen High School track, tennis, football and soccer teams use Bruins Stadium, which is located in James J. Braddock Park. The school's gymnasium serves as the home field for other sports.

Interscholastic sports programs offered include football, boys'/girls' basketball, baseball, softball, boys'/girls' tennis, boys'/girls' cross country, boys'/girls' indoor track and field, boys'/girls' outdoor track and field, boys'/girls' soccer, boys'/girls' volleyball, boys'/girls' bowling and wrestling.

The boys' varsity bowling team won the 1974 overall state championship.

The football team won the North I Group IV state championship in 1977, 1978, 1984, 1988, 1990, 1997 and 2011. The team won their first North I Group IV state sectional title in 1977 with a 6-0 win against Henry Snyder High School in the championship game played at Giants Stadium. In 1978, the team finished 11-0 by winning the North I Group IV championship with a 28-14 win against Passaic Valley High School in the finals at Giant Stadium. The team's 37-3 win in the 1984 North I Group IV title against Ridgewood High School led the team to an 11-0 season. The 1988 team finished the season with a 9-2 record after winning the North I Group IV state sectional title with a 14-13 victory against John F. Kennedy High School after scoring a touchdown and extra point to win in the final minute of the championship game. The 1990 team finished the season with a 9-2 record after winning the North I Group IV sectional title with a 3-0 overtime win against Hoboken High School in the championship game. A 33-10 win against Wayne Valley High School gave the team an 11-0 record for the season and the North I Group IV sectional championship in 1997. After Union City High School opened in 2008, the schools started a rivalry, with Union City leading 6-4 through 2017. NJ.com listed the rivalry at number 30 on its 2017 list "Ranking the 31 fiercest rivalries in N.J. HS football".

The 1977 boys' basketball team, led by Dan Callandrillo, finished the season with a record of 27-1 after winning the Group IV state title by defeating Camden High School by a score of 69-55 in the tournament final. In 2007, the boys' basketball team played in the North I, Group IV sectional championship, falling to Passaic County Technical Institute by 86–85 in overtime, in a game played at Wayne Valley High School; Students and fans from both schools rioted after the game, with a North Bergen student arrested in the melee for assaulting a police officer.

The wrestling team won the North I, Group IV state sectional championship in 1983, 1991 and 1993, and the North I Group V title in 2015.

In 2001, the baseball team won the North I, Group IV state sectional championship with a 7-6 win in extra innings against Memorial of West New York.

== Other extra-curricular activities ==
North Bergen High School features various interest groups and clubs that include the Art Club, Academic Decathlon Team, Bible Club, Chess Club, Color Guard, Debate Team, Distributive Education Clubs of America, Environmental Club, FBLA-PBL and the Gay-Straight Alliance Club.

The high school also offers various culture groups and honor societies, including the French Club, Indian Cultural Club, Muslim Cultural Awareness Club (MCAC), German Club, Italian Club, Spanish Club, Russian Club, German Club, National Honor Society, French National Honor Society, German National Honor Society, Italian National Honor Society, Russian National Honor Society and Spanish National Honor Society.

North Bergen High School students can participate in community service and student government groups, including Rebel, Key Club and Student Council.

North Bergen High School is home to various performance groups, such as the Stage Crew, Modeling club, Drama club, Dance club, Marching Band, Concert Band, Jazz Band, Wind Ensemble, The Advanced Sciences Club, Music Creation (M.C) and Advanced Music Creation (A.M.C).

== Administration ==
The school's principal is Richard Locricchio. His core administration team includes the four vice principals.

== Notable alumni ==
- 070 Shake (born 1997), stage name of rapper Danielle Balbuena
- Mohamed Mahmood Alessa, charged in 2010 with planning to travel to Somalia to join an Al Qaeda-linked terrorist group based there
- Rick Apodaca (born 1980), Puerto Rican professional basketball player who has played in the NCAA, USBL, NBDL, and the National Superior Basketball League of Puerto Rico
- Dan Callandrillo (born 1959), former professional basketball player who was part of North Bergen's Group IV state championship in 1977
- Joey Diaz (born 1963), standup comedian and actor
- Evan Rodriguez (born 1988), former NFL fullback and tight end who played for the Tampa Bay Buccaneers
- Rena Sofer (born 1968), actress
