= North Bergen School District =

School district in Hudson County, New Jersey, US

Address
- 7317 Kennedy Boulevard North Bergen, Hudson County, New Jersey, 07047; United States
- Coordinates: 40.75738°N 74.045839°W

District information
- Grades: pre-K to 12
- Superintendent: George J. Solter Jr.
- Business administrator: Steven Somick
- Schools: 8

Students and staff
- Enrollment: 7,165 (as of 2023–24)
- Faculty: 553.4 FTEs
- Student–teacher ratio: 13.0:1

Other information
- District Factor Group: B
- Website: www.northbergen.k12.nj.us
Ind.	Per pupil	District spending	Rank (*)	K-12 average	%± vs. average
1A	Total Spending	$15,430	7	$18,891	−18.3%
1	Budgetary Cost	12,534	14	14,783	−15.2%
2	Classroom Instruction	7,468	9	8,763	−14.8%
6	Support Services	1,638	12	2,392	−31.5%
8	Administrative Cost	1,621	77	1,485	9.2%
10	Operations & Maintenance	1,477	34	1,783	−17.2%
13	Extracurricular Activities	239	49	268	−10.8%
16	Median Teacher Salary	72,250	87	64,043
Data from NJDoE 2014 Taxpayers' Guide to Education Spending. *Of K-12 districts with more than 3,500 students. Lowest spending=1; Highest=103

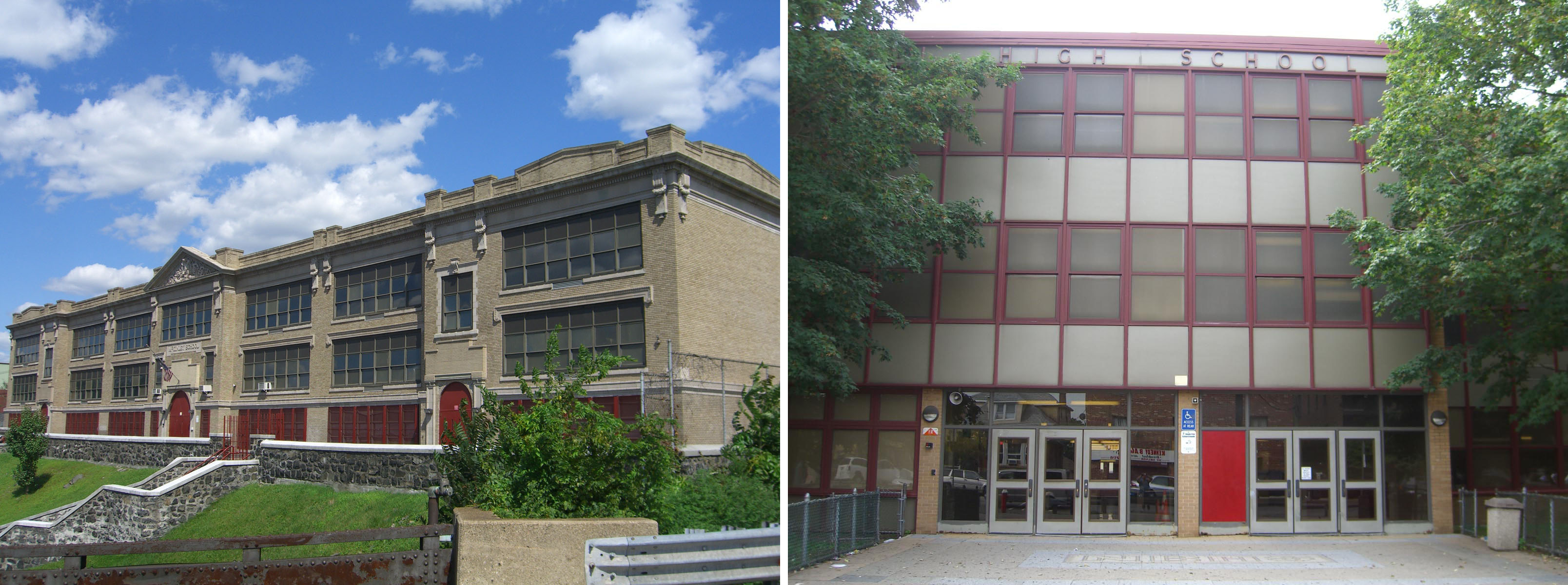
McKinley School (left) and North Bergen High School (right)

The North Bergen School District is a comprehensive community public school district that serves students in pre-kindergarten through twelfth grade from North Bergen, in Hudson County, in the U.S. state of New Jersey.

As of the 2023–24 school year, the district, comprised of eight schools, had an enrollment of 7,165 students and 553.4 classroom teachers (on an FTE basis), for a student–teacher ratio of 13.0:1.

Students from Guttenberg attend the district's high school as part of a sending/receiving relationship with the Guttenberg Public School District.

== History ==
After High Tech High School moved to a new facility in Secaucus for the 2018–19 school year, the former High Tech High School campus was acquired by the North Bergen district, with plans to construct a new junior high school for grades 7-9 on the site. The school officially opened in September 2025 and was named in honor of township mayor Nicholas Sacco.

The district had been classified by the New Jersey Department of Education as being in District Factor Group "B", the second-lowest of eight groupings. District Factor Groups organize districts statewide to allow comparison by common socioeconomic characteristics of the local districts. From lowest socioeconomic status to highest, the categories are A, B, CD, DE, FG, GH, I and J.

== Schools ==
Schools in the district (with 2023–24 enrollment data from the National Center for Education Statistics) are:

Elementary schools

- Franklin Elementary School (524 students; in grades PreK–6)
  - Hamza Abdelhadi, principal
- Robert Fulton Elementary School (885; PreK-6)
  - Thelma Noreen Garcia, principal
- John F. Kennedy Elementary School (566; PreK–6)
  - Frank Bafumi, principal
- Lincoln Elementary School (1,209; PreK–6)
  - Nicholas Sacco, principal
- Horace Mann Elementary School (968; PreK–6)
  - Maria Alonso, principal
- McKinley Elementary School (320; PreK–6)
  - Joseph Bartulovich, principal
- Polk Street Elementary School (258; PreK–6)
  - Adamarys Galvin, principal

Junior High School

- Nicholas J. Sacco Junior High School (1,500; 7-9)

High school

- North Bergen High School (1,800; 10–12)
  - Richard Locricchio, principal

== Administration ==
Core members of the district's administration are:

- George J. Solter Jr., superintendent
- Steven Somick, business administrator
- Hugo D. Cabrera, board secretary

== Board of education ==
The district's board of education, comprised of nine members, sets policy and oversees the fiscal and educational operation of the district through its administration. As a Type II school district, the board's trustees are elected directly by voters to serve three-year terms of office on a staggered basis, with three seats up for election each year held as part of the April school election; a tenth board member is appointed to represent the sending district of Guttenberg. The board appoints a superintendent to oversee the district's day-to-day operations and a business administrator to supervise the business functions of the district. Of the nearly 600 school districts statewide, North Bergen is one of 12 districts with school elections in April, in which voters also decide on passage of the annual school budget.
