= Mark Tross =

Mark Tross is an American Christian pastor, radio and television personality, columnist, and former disk jockey residing in New Mexico. The current pastor at Victory Church of God in Grants, New Mexico, Tross is also host of Ask The Pastor, New Mexico's longest-running radio call-in program.

== Early life and education ==
Tross was born in Newark, New Jersey, on May 8, 1957, to Marian Claire and Frederick Tross. He attended Passaic Valley Regional High School, graduating in 1975. He then attended Connecticut School of Broadcasting. Tross landed his first radio gig at WKMB, Stirling Country, as a Country Music DJ in 1980. He produced his own radio program in Elmira, New York, called The Number 1 Hits of All Time.

== Career ==
Tross retired from Pathmark, a supermarket company based in New Jersey, where he was a manager for 23 years. Prior to that, he managed for Quick-Chek Food Stores and worked for ShopRite supermarket in Little Falls, New Jersey, where he lived during his high school years.

Tross made a number of guest appearances on Two Nice Jewish Boys, a radio program hosted by Gary Selman and Jonathan Cahn, author of The Harbinger, on WWDJ. Tross was assistant pastor for Cahn at Beth Israel Messianic Center in Lodi, New Jersey, and later in Garfield, New Jersey, in the late 1980s and early-1990s. In 1982, Tross became a Christian and was licensed under Pastor Charlie Rizzo, from Maranatha, Church of the Nazarene and helped establish the Harvest Christian Fellowship of New York City, with Pastor Mike Finizio.

After moving to New Mexico, Tross was licensed through the International Church of the Foursquare Gospel in Rio Rancho, was pastor of Gladstone Church, Overseer of Ekklesia Outreach in Rio Rancho, until he moved to Grants in March 2012. Tross served as Foursquare Missions Coordinator for Foursquare and also oversaw the Simple Church initiative for that organization, under its president, Pastor Jack Hayford.

Tross is the host of the radio show The Bible Factor, formerly called New Mexico News & Views. He first started this program with Pastor Larry Moss, formerly of Heights Cumberland Presbyterian Church in Albuquerque, New Mexico.

Tross writes a faith column published in the Cibola Beacon and also participates in a weekly television program, 'Cross Culture', hosted by Haskell Hallmark, a preacher at the Rio Rancho Church Of Christ. Tross has appeared on KOB in Albuquerque, discussing the National Day of Prayer, as he and his wife Juliet were to be the NM State Coordinators. He has appeared on Dewey & Friends in Albuquerque and God Answers Prayer in Santa Fe (the first two 24 hour television stations in the United States) and he has been heard on various stations over the years in Albuquerque. Mark performed the Aaronic Blessing for Pastor John Hagee of Christians United for Israel at the 25th Anniversary Celebration of KDAZ.

Tross also managed an event, "Walk for Life", to raise money to purchase an ultrasound machine for the Care-Net Pregnancy Center of Rio Rancho.

Mark appeared in The Simple Church Documentary, and has authored a book, The Greatest of All Songs, a commentary on the Song of Solomon.

== Personal life ==
Tross has one married daughter and two grandsons.
