= Daniel Johnston (scientist) =

American neuroscientist (born 1947)

- Born: December 9, 1947 (age 78); Passaic, New Jersey, U.S.
- Occupations: Professor, neuroscientist

Daniel Johnston (born December 9, 1947) is an American neuroscientist whose research has focused on the electrical properties of neuronal dendrites and the ion channels that shape them. He is professor emeritus in the Department of Neuroscience at the University of Texas at Austin College of Natural Sciences, where he held the Karl Folkers Chair in Interdisciplinary Biomedical Research from 2004 to 2022 and was the founding director of the Center for Learning and Memory.

== Early life and education ==
Johnston was born in Passaic, New Jersey, on December 9, 1947. Raised in Little Falls, New Jersey, from the age of five, he attended the local public schools and graduated from Passaic Valley Regional High School. He graduated with distinction from the University of Virginia in 1970 with a bachelor of science degree in electrical engineering. He completed a PhD in biomedical engineering and physiology at Duke University in 1974; his doctoral research, carried out in the laboratory of Howard Wachtel, examined lateral inhibition in the eye of the horseshoe crab Limulus. He then completed postdoctoral training in cellular neurophysiology at the University of Minnesota, where he worked with the neurologist Giovanni Ayala, studying the effects of anticonvulsant drugs on bursting neurons of the sea slug Aplysia.

== Career ==
In 1975, Johnston joined the University of Minnesota faculty as an assistant professor of neurology and biomedical engineering. The following year, he was a Grass Foundation Fellow in neurobiology at the Marine Biological Laboratory in Woods Hole, Massachusetts.

Johnston left the University of Minnesota in 1977 for a position on the Baylor College of Medicine faculty in Houston, where Stanley Appel, who had moved from Duke to establish a new department of neurology, offered him a position as assistant professor of neurology. He remained at Baylor until 2004, rising to full professor in the Department of Neurology, the Department of Molecular Physiology and Biophysics and the Division of Neuroscience, and serving as director of graduate studies in the Division of Neuroscience from 1988 to 2004.

In 2004, Johnston was named director of the Institute for Neuroscience at UT Austin and a professor in the university's Section of Neurobiology, succeeding Creed Abell. He had been recruited by Mary Ann Rankin, then dean of the College of Natural Sciences, on the condition that an independent center for learning and memory research be created; he founded the Center for Learning and Memory that year and directed it until 2020. He led the Institute for Neuroscience until 2015, chaired the Department of Neuroscience from 2011 to 2015, and became professor emeritus in 2022.

Johnston chaired the 2002 Gordon Research Conference on Synaptic Transmission and co-chaired, with Erin Schuman, the 2011 Gordon Research Conference on Dendrites. From 2007 to 2012 he served on the Board of Scientific Counselors of the National Institute of Child Health and Human Development. He has served on the editorial boards of the Journal of Neuroscience, the Journal of Neurophysiology, Epilepsy Research and Neuroscience.

== Research ==
Johnston's laboratory has applied quantitative and biophysical approaches, drawing on his training in engineering, to the study of neurons and synapses in the hippocampus and cortex. At Baylor, Johnston and John Hablitz, with Wilkie A. Wilson of Duke University, who had designed the single-electrode voltage clamp, used the technique to record from burst-firing neurons in hippocampal slices, identifying a slow inward current; Johnston later described the work as one of the first voltage-clamp studies of neurons in a brain slice. With Thomas Brown he tested the hypothesis that the paroxysmal depolarizing shift seen during epileptiform activity is produced by a giant synaptic potential, and the experiments supported it.

In the 1990s his laboratory, with Jeffrey Magee, Dax Hoffman and Costa Colbert, made patch-clamp recordings directly from the dendrites of hippocampal pyramidal neurons and studied the voltage-gated sodium, calcium and potassium channels found there. The group showed that action potentials propagating back into the dendrites, when paired with synaptic input, act as an associative signal for the induction of long-term potentiation, and that dendritic potassium channels regulate this back-propagation.

The laboratory also showed that dendritic ion channels are distributed non-uniformly and change with activity and disease. In 2004, Johnston and colleagues reported that in rats with experimental temporal lobe epilepsy, hippocampal dendrites had fewer potassium channels and the remaining channels were altered, a change they described as an acquired dendritic channelopathy. Later work examined hyperpolarization-activated (HCN) channels in plasticity, epilepsy and depression, and the prefrontal cortex in mouse models of fragile X syndrome; in 2017 the group reported that prefrontal dysfunction in fragile X mice depends on the continued absence of the fragile X protein in the adult brain, and that restoring the protein in adult animals improved prefrontal function.

With Samuel Miao-sin Wu, Johnston wrote Foundations of Cellular Neurophysiology (MIT Press, 1995), a graduate textbook developed from a course the two taught at Baylor.

== Honors and awards ==
- McKnight Foundation Neuroscience Development Award (1982–1985)
- MERIT Award, National Institute of Mental Health (1989–2009)
- Michael E. DeBakey, M.D., Excellence in Research Award, Baylor College of Medicine (1997)
- Marc Dresden Excellence in Graduate Education Award, Baylor College of Medicine (1999)
- Barbara and Corbin J. Robertson Jr. Presidential Award for Excellence in Education, Baylor College of Medicine (2001)
- Dart Foundation Scholar in Learning and Memory, Marine Biological Laboratory (2004–2006)
- Gill Distinguished Neuroscience Investigator Award, Linda and Jack Gill Center for Biomolecular Science, Indiana University (2009)
- McKnight Memory and Cognitive Disorders Award, McKnight Endowment Fund for Neuroscience, with Michael Mauk (2011–2013)
- Fellow of the American Association for the Advancement of Science (2016)
- McKnight Memory and Cognitive Disorders Award, with Boris Zemelman (2017–2019)

== Personal life ==
Johnston and his wife, Jean, married in December 1973; they have three children and seven grandchildren.

== Selected publications ==
- Johnston, D.; Wu, S. M. (1995). Foundations of Cellular Neurophysiology. Cambridge, MA: MIT Press. ISBN 978-0-262-10053-3.
- Johnston, D.; Brown, T. H. (1981). "Giant synaptic potential hypothesis for epileptiform activity". Science. 211 (4479): 294–297. doi:10.1126/science.7444469
- Magee, J. C.; Johnston, D. (1995). "Synaptic activation of voltage-gated channels in the dendrites of hippocampal pyramidal neurons". Science. 268 (5208): 301–304.
- Johnston, D.; Magee, J. C.; Colbert, C. M.; Christie, B. R. (1996). "Active properties of neuronal dendrites". Annual Review of Neuroscience. 19: 165–186. doi:10.1146/annurev.ne.19.030196.001121
- Magee, J. C.; Johnston, D. (1997). "A synaptically controlled, associative signal for Hebbian plasticity in hippocampal neurons". Science. 275 (5297): 209–213. doi:10.1126/science.275.5297.209
- Hoffman, D. A.; Magee, J. C.; Colbert, C. M.; Johnston, D. (1997). "K+ channel regulation of signal propagation in dendrites of hippocampal pyramidal neurons". Nature. 387 (6636): 869–875. doi:10.1038/43119
- Bernard, C.; Anderson, A.; Becker, A.; Poolos, N. P.; Beck, H.; Johnston, D. (2004). "Acquired dendritic channelopathy in temporal lobe epilepsy". Science. 305 (5683): 532–535. doi:10.1126/science.1097065
