= Joseph Samuel Nathaniel Tross =

Joseph Samuel Nathaniel Tross (April 2, 1889 – March 30, 1971) was an evangelist and civil rights leader. He was born in Berbice, British Guiana, which is located in South America, on April 2, 1889. He attended Oxford University and later moved to Canada in 1913. During World War I Tross moved to the United States and attended Harvard University. He earned a Ph.D. in religion at the University of Pittsburgh. In 1918 Tross married Geneva Hopkins. The couple eventually settled in Charlotte, North Carolina where Tross continued his career as a pastor at several AME and AME Zion churches in the area.

In 1934 Tross wrote This Thing Called Religion. A copy of his book is in the rare book collection of J Murrey Atkins Library.

Tross had many jobs. In 1940 he was president of the Community Crusaders, appearing before the Charlotte City Council to lobby for street lights in black neighborhoods. During World War II he was president of the Charlotte Rationing Board. After the war he lobbied for the employment of African Americans as police officers. In 1945 Tross began a weekly radio broadcast on WBT where he often discussed the idea of interracial goodwill in the community. He was the editor of The Charlotte Post an African American newspaper beginning in 1949.

In 1960 Tross gained his American citizenship. As a result, he ran for a seat on the Charlotte School Board in 1994, 1966 and 1967, although he never won. In 1965 Tross met President Lyndon B Johnson at the White House and advised Johnson not to acknowledge protesters sitting in at the White House because speaking would tarnish the dignity of the office of president. This advice created a split in the civil rights movement and created tension between Tross and Martin Luther King Jr.

On March 30, 1971, Tross died from a stroke at the age of 82.
