= Union Township, Hudson County, New Jersey =

Coordinates: 40.7884°N 74.0131°W

Union Township was a township that existed in Hudson County, New Jersey, United States. The township existed from 1861 to 1898.

Union Township ("Town of Union") was incorporated as a township by an Act of the New Jersey Legislature on February 28, 1861, from portions of North Bergen Township.

Portions of the township were taken on March 29, 1864, to form the town Union Hill, which became part of Union City in 1925. A portion of Union Township was annexed by Guttenberg in 1878.

On July 5, 1898, the residents of the remaining portions of Union Township passed a referendum to incorporate the town of West New York, which became effective as of July 8, 1898; With the creation of West New York, Union Township was dissolved.

Two other municipalities in New Jersey are currently named Union Township. One is in Hunterdon County and the other is in Union County.

== Sources ==
- "Municipal Incorporations of the State of New Jersey (according to Counties)" prepared by the Division of Local Government, Department of the Treasury (New Jersey); December 1, 1958.
- "The Story of New Jersey's Civil Boundaries: 1606-1968", John P. Snyder, Bureau of Geology and Topography; Trenton, New Jersey; 1969. doi:10.7282/T30C4SQB
