= Union Hill, New Jersey =

Union Hill
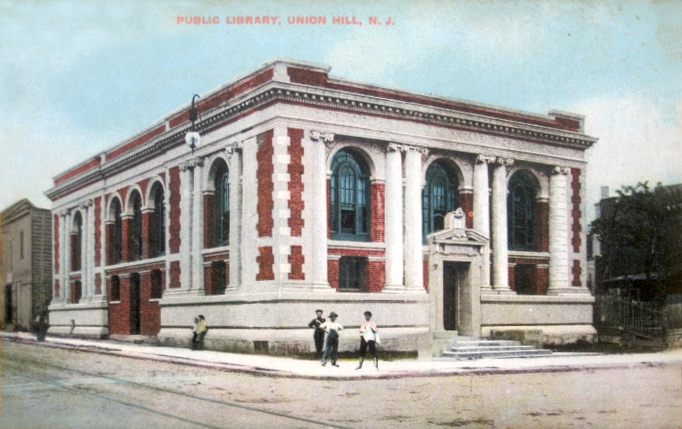
- The public library on Main Street (today 43rd Street) on the corner of New York Avenue in Union Hill, New Jersey, which is today Union City
- Interactive map of Union Hill
- Coordinates: 40.775878°N 74.024827°W
- Country: United States
- State: New Jersey
- County: Hudson
- Founded: March 29, 1864
- Merged: June 1, 1925

Historical population
| Census | Pop. | Note | %± |
|---|---|---|---|
| 1870 | 4,640 | | — |
| 1880 | 5,849 | | 26.1% |
| 1890 | 10,643 | | 82.0% |
| 1900 | 15,187 | | 42.7% |
| 1910 | 21,023 | | 38.4% |
| 1920 | 20,651 | | −1.8% |
source: 1870-1920

Union Hill was a town that existed in Hudson County, New Jersey, United States, from 1864 to June 1, 1925, when it merged with West Hoboken to form Union City.

== History ==
=== Civic boundaries ===
The area that became West Hoboken was originally inhabited by the Munsee-speaking branch of Lenape Native Americans, who wandered in the vast woodland area encountered by Henry Hudson during the voyages he conducted from 1609 to 1610 for the Dutch. Hudson later claimed the area (which included the future New York City) and named it New Netherland. The portion of that land that included the future Hudson County was purchased from members of the Hackensack tribe of the Lenni-Lenape in 1658 by New Netherland colony Director-General Peter Stuyvesant, and became part of Pavonia, New Netherland. The boundaries of the purchase are described in the deed preserved in the New York State Archives, as well as the medium of exchange: "80 fathoms of wampum, 20 fathoms of cloth, 12 brass kettles, 6 guns, one double brass kettle, 2 blankets, and one half barrel of strong beer."

The relationship between the early Dutch settlers and Native Americans was marked by frequent armed conflict over land claims. In 1660, Peter Stuyvesant ordered the building of a fortified village called Bergen to protect the area. It was the first permanent European settlement in New Jersey, located in what is now the Journal Square area of Jersey City near Academy Street. In 1664, the British captured New Netherland from the Dutch, at which point the boundaries of Bergen Township encompassed what is now known as Hudson County. North of this was the unpopulated Bergen Woods, which would later be claimed by settlers, after whom a number of streets were named, such as Brown Street and Golden Lane, which still exist in Union City today.

The area that became Union Hill, however, was sparsely populated until the early 19th century. The British granted Bergen a new town charter in 1668. In 1682 they created Bergen County, which was named to honor their Dutch predecessors. That county comprised all of present-day Hudson, Bergen and Passaic counties. Sparsely inhabited during the 17th and 18th centuries, the southeast section of Bergen County had grown by the early 19th century to the point where it was deemed necessary to designate it a separate county. The New Jersey legislature created Hudson County in 1840, and in 1843, it was divided into two townships: Old Bergen Township (which eventually became Jersey City) and North Bergen Township, which was gradually separated into Hudson County's municipalities of Hoboken (1849), Weehawken and Guttenberg (1859), and Union Township (or simply Union,) (1864), though it was colloquially known as Union Hill. Union Hill was formed through the merger of a number of villages, such as Dalleytown, Buck's Corners and Cox's Corners. The largest of these villages, Union Hill, became the colloquial name for the merged town of Union itself. Union Hill was incorporated as a town by an Act of the New Jersey Legislature on March 29, 1864, from part of Union Township. In 1866, part of North Bergen was added to it. The town was reincorporated on March 27, 1874. The northern section of Union Township was later incorporated as West New York in 1898.

Union Hill merged with West Hoboken to form Union City, which was incorporated on June 1, 1925.

One of Union City's schools, Union Hill Middle School recalls the name of the former town.

=== Commerce ===
The town's commercial district was Bergen Turnpike, at the border with West Hoboken. Intersecting Bergen Turnpike was Bergenline Avenue, a former cowpath that became another commercial venue after plans to lay street car tracks on Palisade Avenue, two blocks to the east, were changed due to the objections of an influential citizen named Henry Kohlmeier. Kohlmeier opposed the noise that such traffic would bring, and suggested moving the tracks to Bergenline Avenue. Bergenline continues as Union City's main commercial thoroughfare, today, and is the longest commercial avenue in New Jersey.

== Mayors ==
- John Corky (1857–1936).

== Notable residents ==
- Paul Jappe (1898–1989), NFL player
- Eugene Jolas (1894–1952), writer, translator and literary critic
- Anne Ceridwen Rees (1874–1905), Welsh medical doctor, practiced in Union Hill
- Jules Couche (1847-1915), French inventor, U.S. patent holder, machinist and foreman of Simon Silk Mill in Union Hill.

== See also ==
- Bergenline, the town's commercial thoroughfare
- Union Turnpike
- Bergen Turnpike, the boundary between the two towns that were merged to form Union City
