= Hudson County, New Jersey =

County in New Jersey, United States

- County
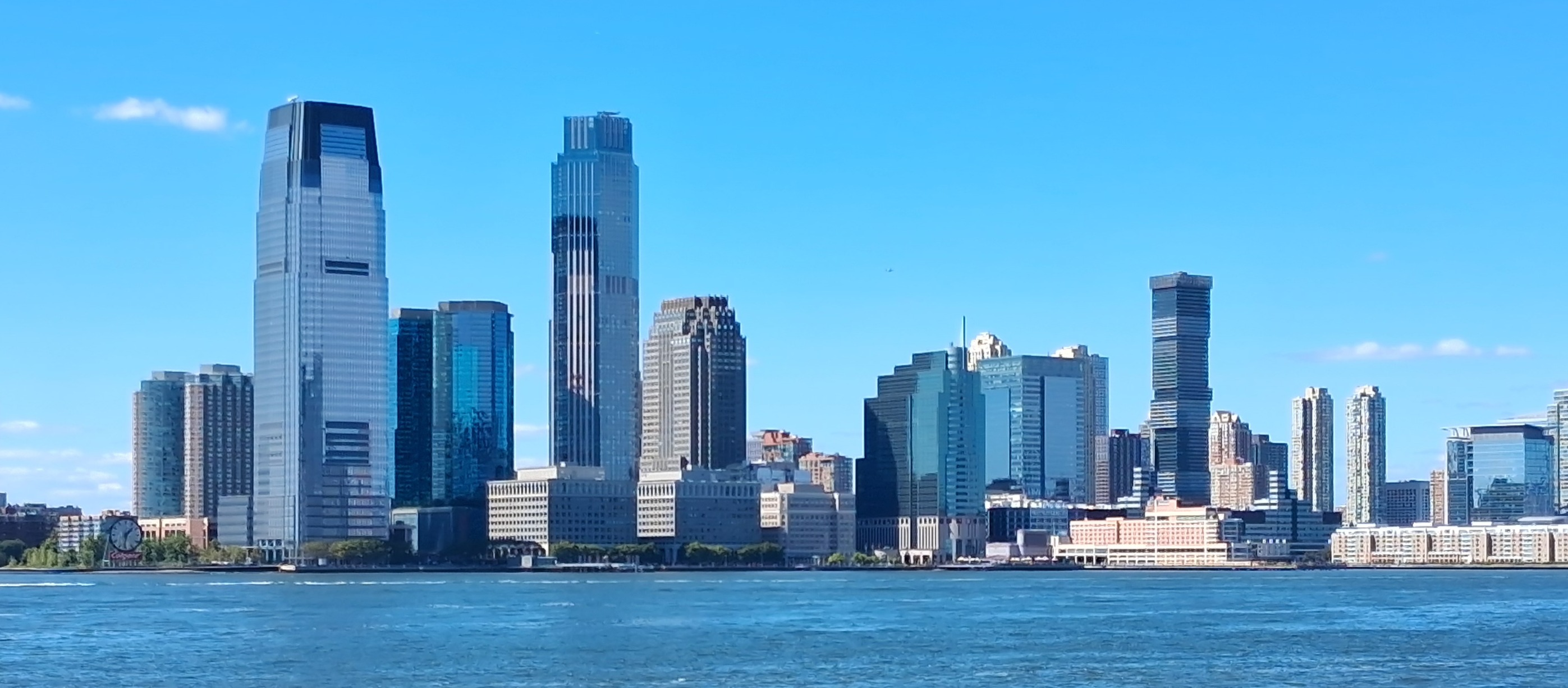
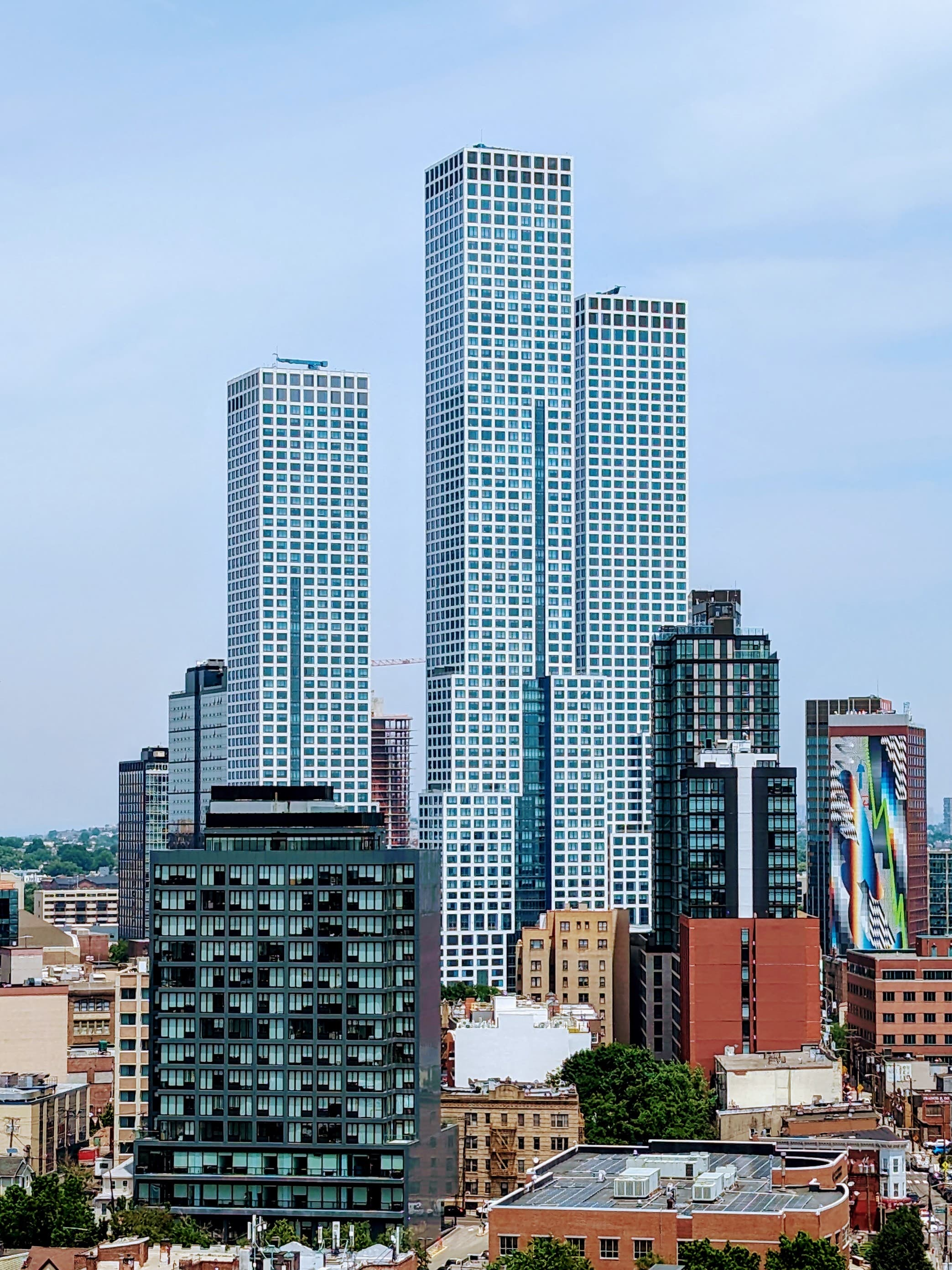
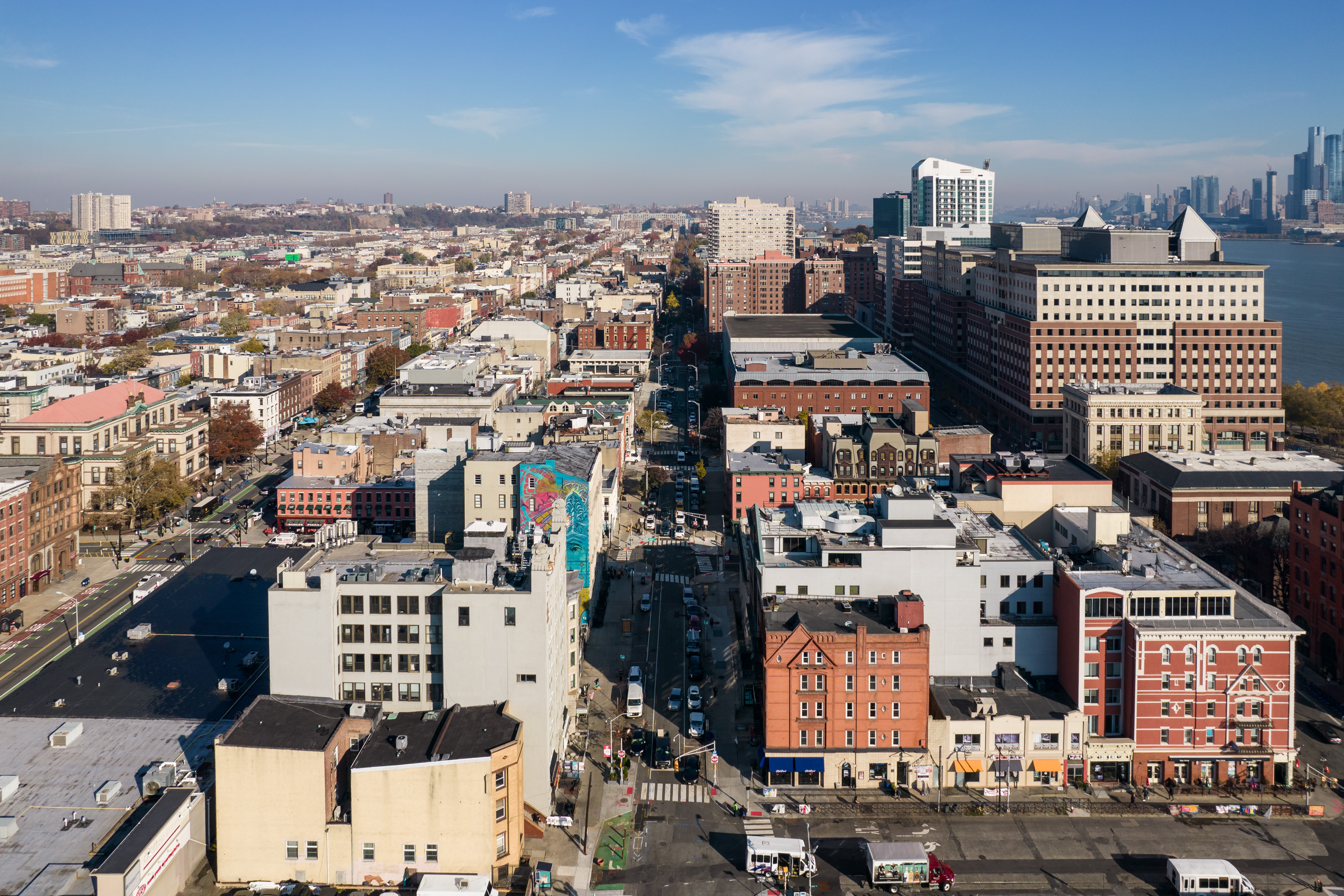
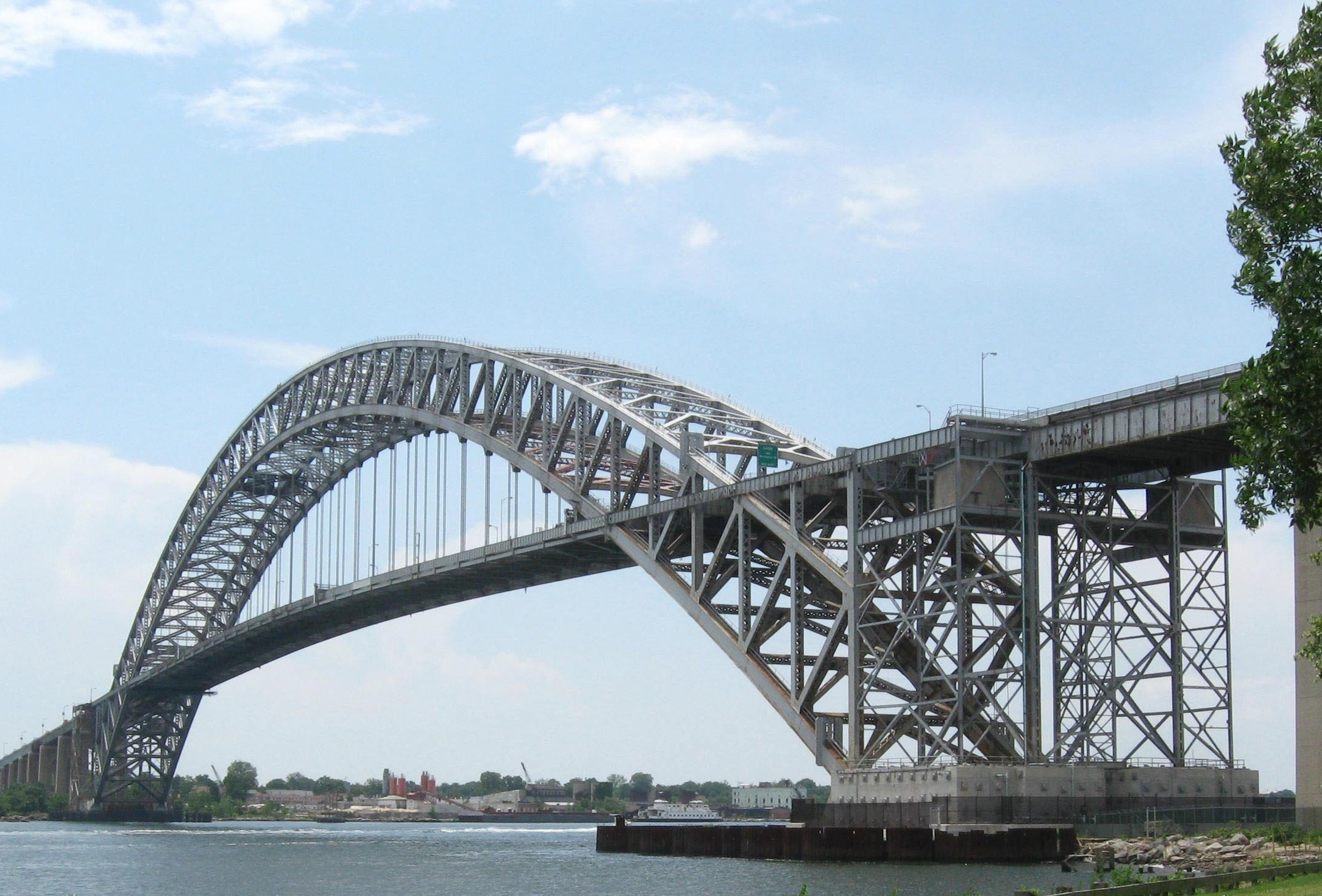
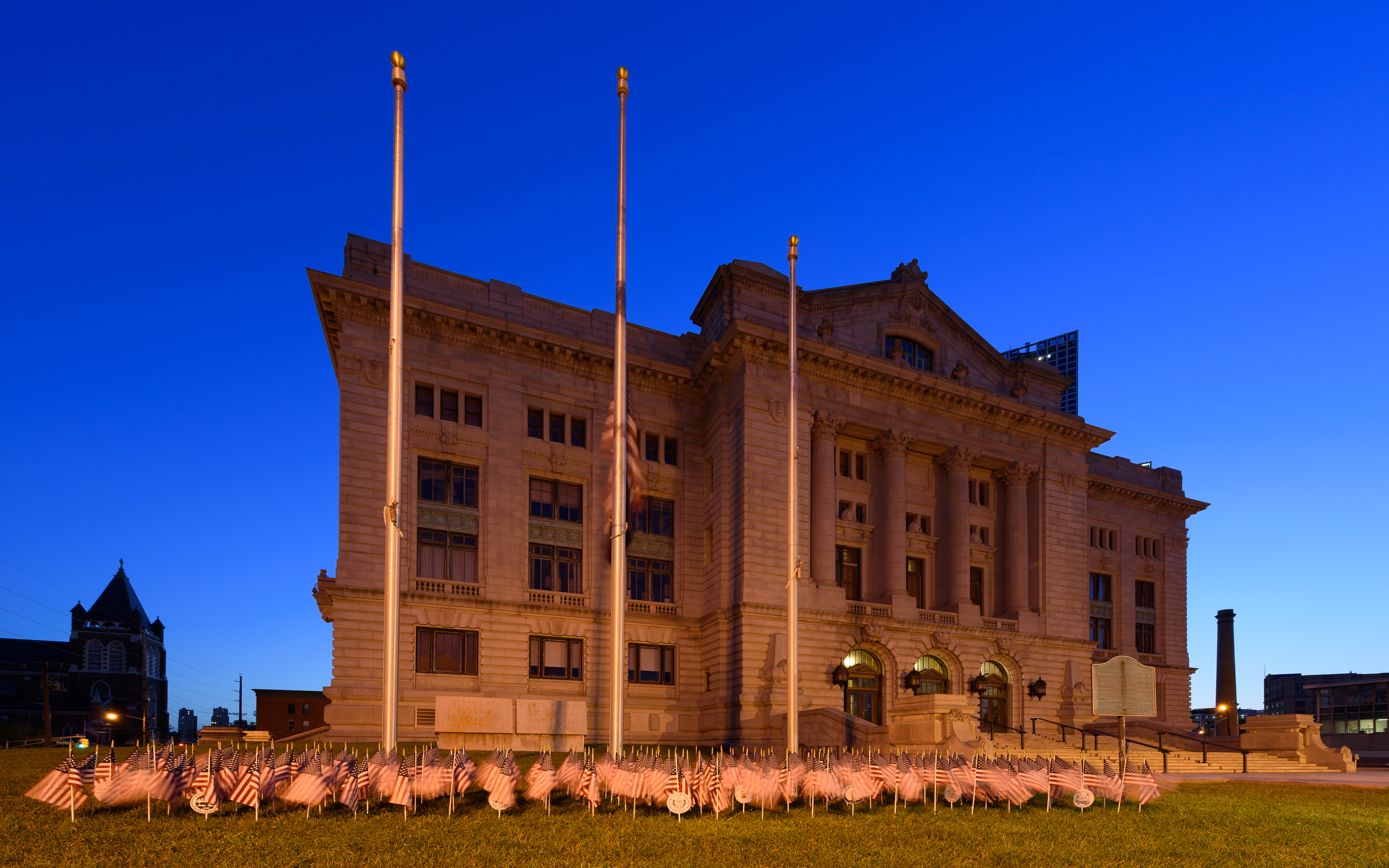
- Downtown Jersey City Journal Square Hoboken Bayonne Bridge Hudson County Courthouse

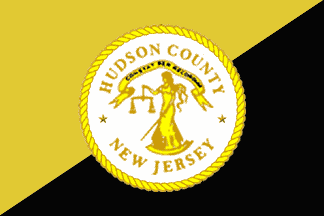
- Flag Seal

- Location within the U.S. state of New Jersey
- Coordinates: 40.73°N 74.08°W
- Country: United States
- State: New Jersey
- Founded: 1840
- Named for: Henry Hudson
- Seat: Jersey City
- Largest city: Jersey City (population and area)

Government
  - County executive: Craig Guy (D, term ends December 31, 2027)

Area
  - Total: 62.35 sq mi (161.5 km^{2})
  - Land: 46.19 sq mi (119.6 km^{2})
  - Water: 16.15 sq mi (41.8 km^{2}) 25.9%

Population (2020)
  - Total: 724,854
  - Estimate (2025): 735,033 ▲
  - Density: 15,690/sq mi (6,059/km^{2})
- Time zone: UTC−5 (Eastern)
  - Summer (DST): UTC−4 (EDT)
- Congressional districts: 8th, 9th, 10th
- Website: www.hcnj.us

Hudson County is a county in the U.S. state of New Jersey, its smallest and most densely populated. Lying in the northeast of the state and on the west bank of the Hudson River, the county is part of the state's Gateway Region and the New York metropolitan area. Its county seat is Jersey City, the county's largest city in terms of both population and area, as well as the second-largest city in the state. Established in 1840, it is named for Henry Hudson, the sea captain who explored the area in 1609. Given its proximity and various mass transit connections to Manhattan, Hudson County is sometimes referred to as New York City's sixth borough. The county is part of the North Jersey region of the state.

As of the 2020 United States census, the county was the state's fourth-most-populous and fastest-growing county in the previous decade, with a population of 724,854, its highest decennial count ever and an increase of 90,588 (+14.3%) from the 2010 census count of 634,266, which in turn reflected an increase of 25,291 (+4.2%) from the 2000 census population of 608,975. The United States Census Bureau's Population Estimates Program estimated a 2025 population of 735,033, an increase of 10,179 (+1.4%) from the 2020 decennial census.

Home to 15,691.5 inhabitants per square mile (6,058.5/km^{2}) in 2020 and covering 46.19 square miles (119.6 km^{2}) of land, Hudson County is New Jersey's geographically smallest and most densely populated county. Hudson County shares extensive mass transit connections with Manhattan, located across the Hudson River, as well as with most of Northern and Central New Jersey.

== Geography and climate ==
=== Climate ===
The average temperature of Hudson County is 51.89 °F (11.05 °C), which is approximately the same as the state average of 51.93 °F (11.07 °C), and lower than the national average of 54.45 °F (12.47 °C).

The county is located on the East Coast of the United States, approximately halfway between the Equator and the North Pole, which results in climate that is influenced by wet, dry, hot, and cold airstreams, and highly variable daily weather. Of New Jersey's five distinct climate regions, Hudson County is located in the Central region, which runs from New York Harbor and the Lower Hudson River to the great bend of the Delaware River near the state capital of Trenton. The high number of urban areas in this region are characterized by a high volume of industry and vehicular traffic that produce large amounts of pollutants. These substances, along with the large amounts of asphalt, brick, and concrete that compose buildings in the area, retain more atmospheric heat, which make it a regularly warmer "heat island" than surrounding suburban and rural areas. The northern border of the Central Zone is often the boundary between freezing and non-freezing precipitation in the winter, and between comfortable and uncomfortable sleeping conditions in the summer.

Hudson County experiences precipitation an average of 116 days a year, during which it receives an annual average of 48 inches of rain, compared to the national average of 38, and 26 inches of snow, compared to the national average of 28. The summer high temperature in July is about 86 degrees, and its winter low in January is 25. On average, there are 219 sunny days per year in the county, compared with the national average of 205.

Jersey City

Climate chart (precipitation, max. and min. temperature)
J	F	M	A	M	J	J	A	S	O	N	D
3.7 38 27	3.2 42 29	4.4 50 35	4.5 61 45	4.2 71 54	4.4 79 64	4.6 84 69	4.4 83 68	4.3 75 61	4.4 64 50	4 54 42	4 43 32
- █ Average max. and min. temperatures in °F
- █ Precipitation totals in inches
- Source: The Weather Channel
Metric conversion
J	F	M	A	M	J	J	A	S	O	N	D
93 3 −3	82 6 −2	111 10 2	114 16 7	106 22 12	112 26 18	117 29 21	113 28 20	109 24 16	112 18 10	102 12 6	102 6 0
- █ Average max. and min. temperatures in °C
- █ Precipitation totals in mm

Average temperatures in the county seat of Jersey City have ranged from a low of 27 °F (−3 °C) in January to a high of 84 °F (29 °C) in July, although a record low of −15 °F (−26 °C) was recorded in February 1934 and a record high of 106 °F (41 °C) was recorded in July 1936. Average monthly precipitation ranged from 3.21 in (82 mm) in February to 4.60 in (117 mm) in July.

=== Landforms and borders ===
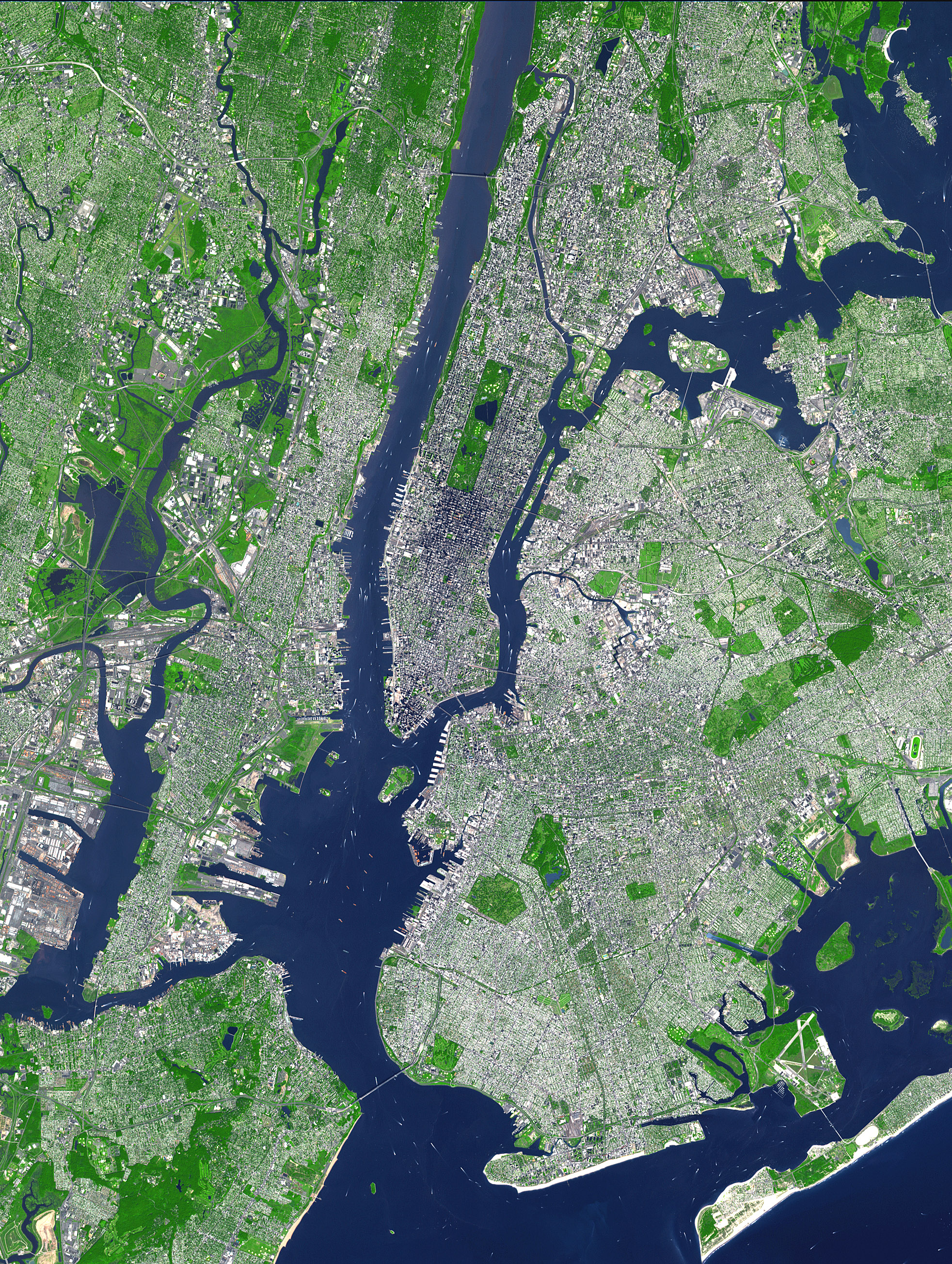
Satellite image showing the core of the New York metropolitan area. Over 10 million people live in the area depicted. Much of Hudson County is located on the peninsula at left.

According to the U.S. Census Bureau, as of the 2020 Census, the county had a total area of 62.35 square miles (161.5 km^{2}), of which 46.19 square miles (119.6 km^{2}) was land (74.1%) and 16.15 square miles (41.8 km^{2}) was water (25.9%). Based on land area, it is the smallest of New Jersey's 21 counties, less than half the size of the next smallest (Union County) and the eighth-smallest of all counties in the United States.

Hudson is located in the heart of New York metropolitan area in northeastern New Jersey. It is bordered by the Hudson River and Upper New York Bay to the east; Kill Van Kull to the south; Newark Bay and the Hackensack River or the Passaic River to the west; its only land border is shared with Bergen County to the north.

The topography is marked by the New Jersey Palisades in the north with cliffs overlooking the Hudson River to the east and less severe cuesta, or slope, to the west. They gradually level off to the southern peninsula, which is coastal and flat. The western region, around the Hackensack and Passaic is part of the New Jersey Meadowlands. Much of the land along the county's extensive shoreline and littoral zone was created by land reclamation.

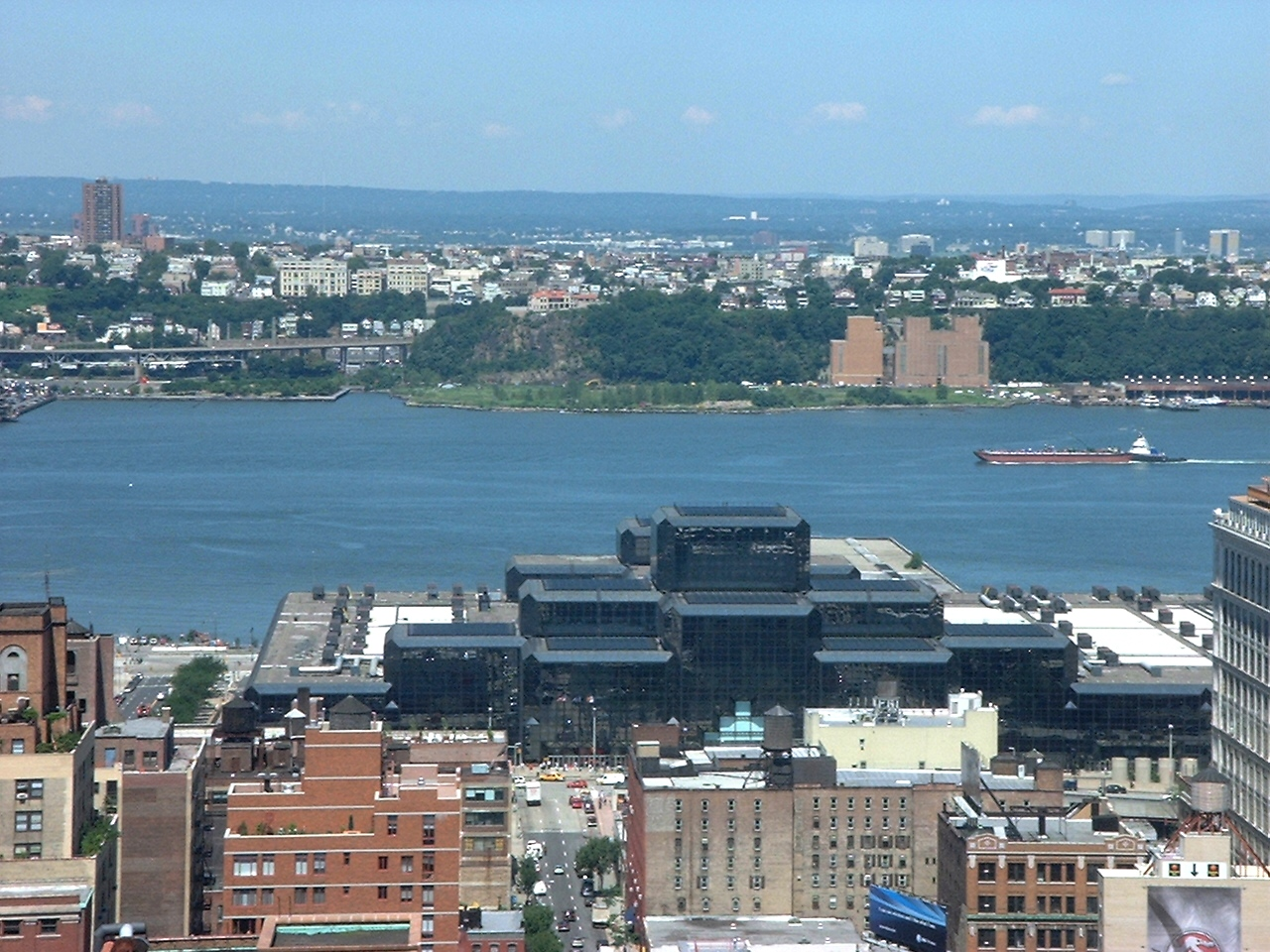
Hudson County and the Palisades, viewed across the Hudson River from Manhattan. The glass building visible is the Javits Center.

The highest point, at 260 feet (79 m) above sea level, is in West New York; the lowest point is at sea level. North Bergen is the city with the second most hills per square mile in the United States behind San Francisco.

Ellis Island and Liberty Island, opposite Liberty State Park, lie entirely within Hudson County's waters, which extend to the New York state line. Liberty Island is part of New York. Largely created through land reclamation, Ellis Island covers a land area of 27.5 acres (11.1 ha), with the 2.74-acre (1.11 ha) natural island and contiguous areas comprising a 3.3 acres (1.3 ha) exclave of New York. Shooters Island, in the Kill van Kull, is also shared with New York. Robbins Reef Light sits atop a reef which runs parallel the Bayonne and Jersey City waterfront.

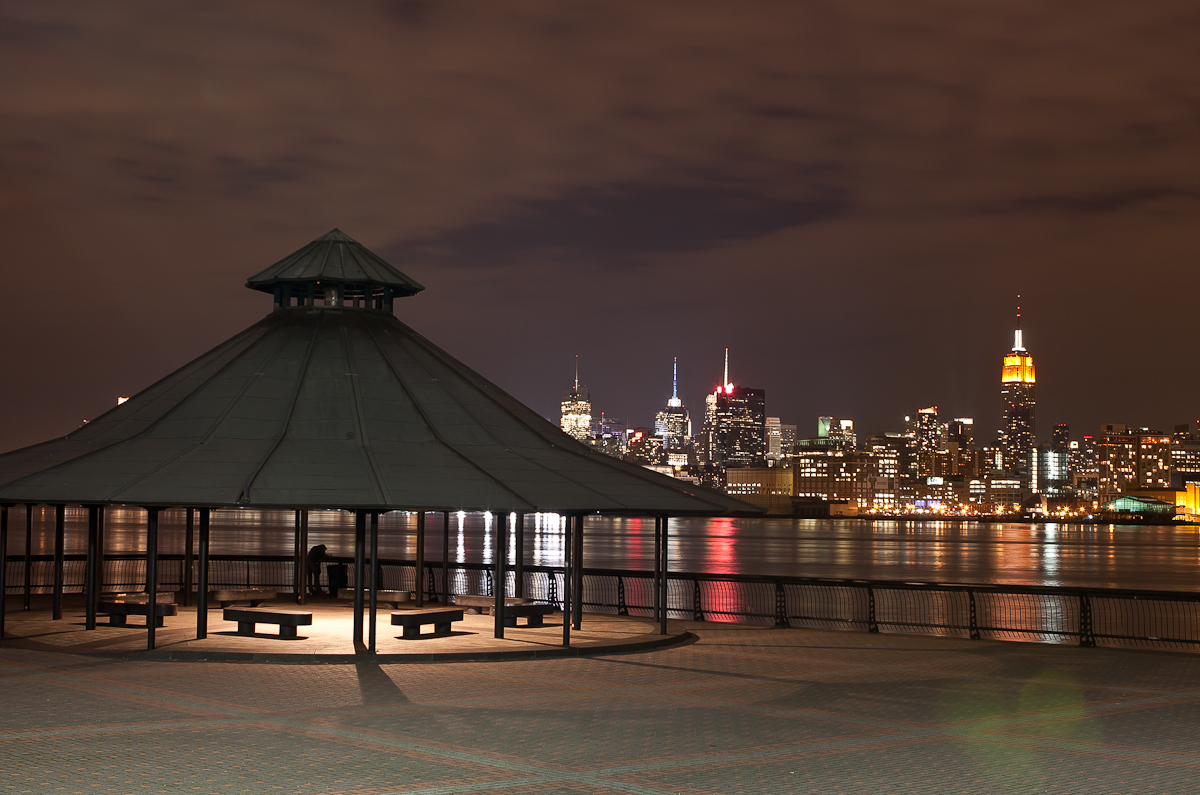
Midtown Manhattan, seen across the Hudson River from Hoboken at night

Much of the county lies between the Hackensack and Hudson Rivers on a geographically long narrow peninsula, (sometimes called Bergen Neck), which is a contiguous urban area where it is often difficult to know when one's crossed a civic boundary. These boundaries and the topography-including many hills and inlets-create very distinct neighborhoods. Kennedy Boulevard runs the entire length of the peninsula. Numerous cuts for rail and vehicular traffic cross Bergen Hill.

Given its proximity to Manhattan, it is sometimes referred to as New York City's sixth borough.

== History ==
=== Etymology ===
Hudson County is named after the explorer Henry Hudson, who charted much of the region in 1609.

=== The Lenape and New Netherland ===
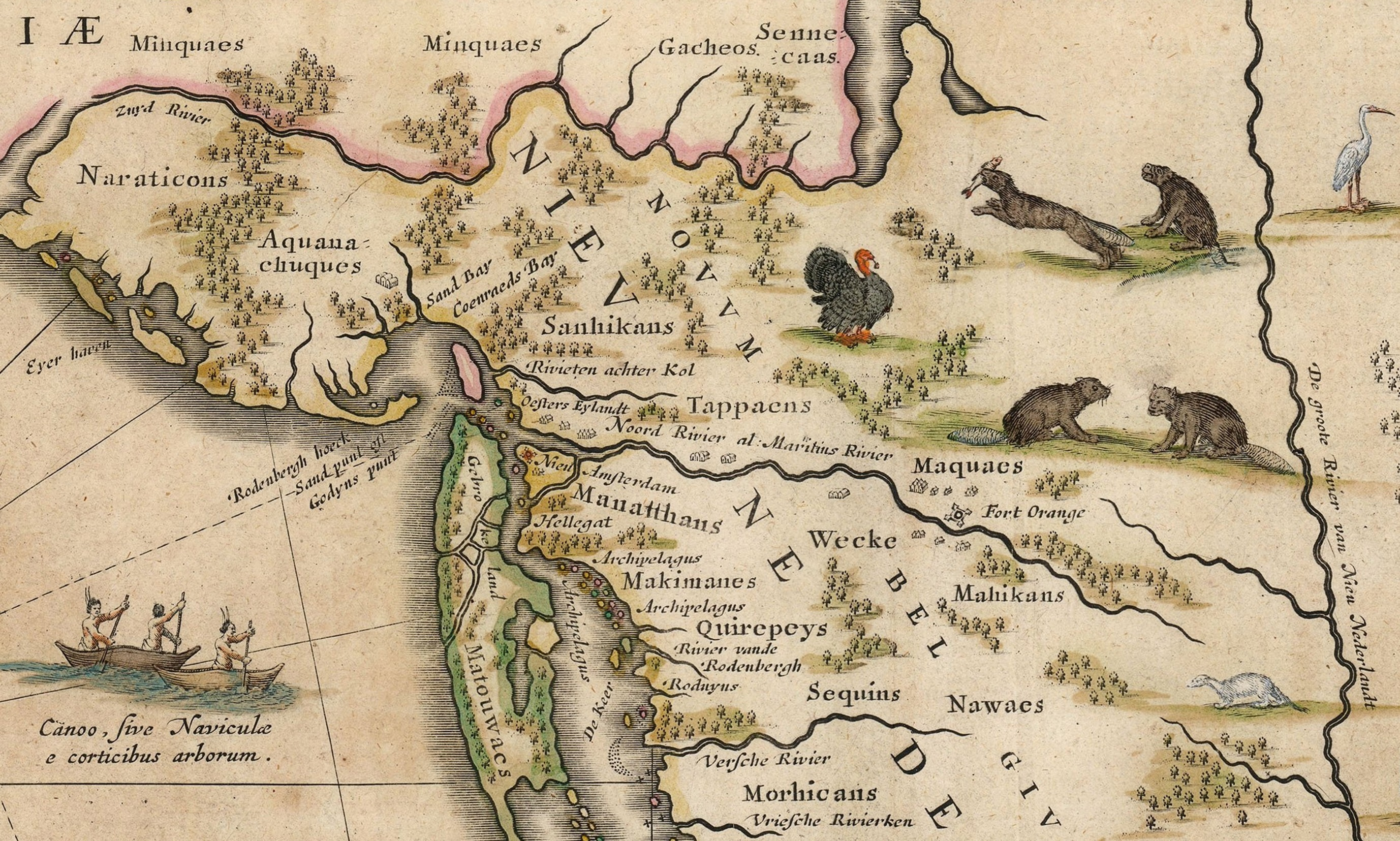
A map of today's northern New Jersey and southern New York state, c. 1634 (with north oriented to the right, and Long Island at center left). Hudson County is called Oesters Eylandt, or Oyster Island.

At the time of European contact in the 17th century, Hudson County was the territory of the Lenape (or Lenni-Lenape), namely the bands (or family groups) known as the Hackensack, the Tappan, the Raritan, and the Manhattan. They were a seasonally migrational people who practiced small-scale agriculture (companion planting) augmented by hunting and gathering which likely, given the topography of the area, included much (shell) fishing and trapping. These groups had early and frequent trading contact with Europeans. Their Algonquian language can still be inferred in many local place names such as Communipaw, Harsimus, Hackensack, Hoboken, Weehawken, Secaucus, and Pamrapo.

Henry Hudson, for whom the county and river on which it sits are named, established a claim for the area in 1609 when anchoring his ship the Halve Maen (Half Moon) at Harsimus Cove and Weehawken Cove. The west bank of the North River (as it was called) and the cliffs, hills, and marshlands abutting and beyond it, were settled by Europeans (Dutch, Flemish, Walloon, Huguenot) from the Lowlands around the same time as New Amsterdam. In 1630, Michiel Pauw received a land patent, or patroonship and purchased the land between the Hudson and Hackensack Rivers, giving it the Latinized form of his name, Pavonia. He failed to settle the area and was forced to return his holdings to the Dutch West India Company. Homesteads were established at Communipaw (1633), Harsimus (1634), Paulus Hook (1638), and Hoebuck (1643). Relations were tenuous with the Lenape, and eventually led to Kieft's War, which began as a slaughter by the Dutch at Communipaw and is considered to be one of the first genocides of Native Americans by Europeans. A series of raids and reprisals across the province lasted two years and ended in an uneasy truce. Other homesteads were established at Constable Hook (1646), Awiehaken (1647), and other lands at Achter Col on Bergen Neck. In 1658, Director-General Peter Stuyvesant of New Netherland negotiated a deal with the Lenape to re-purchase the area named Bergen, "by the great rock above Wiehacken," including the whole peninsula from Sikakes south to Bergen Point/Constable Hook. In 1661, a charter was granted the new village/garrison at the site of present-day Bergen Square, establishing what is considered to be the oldest self-governing municipality in New Jersey. The British gained control of the area in 1664, and the Dutch finally ceded formal control of the province to the English in 1674.

=== The British and early America ===
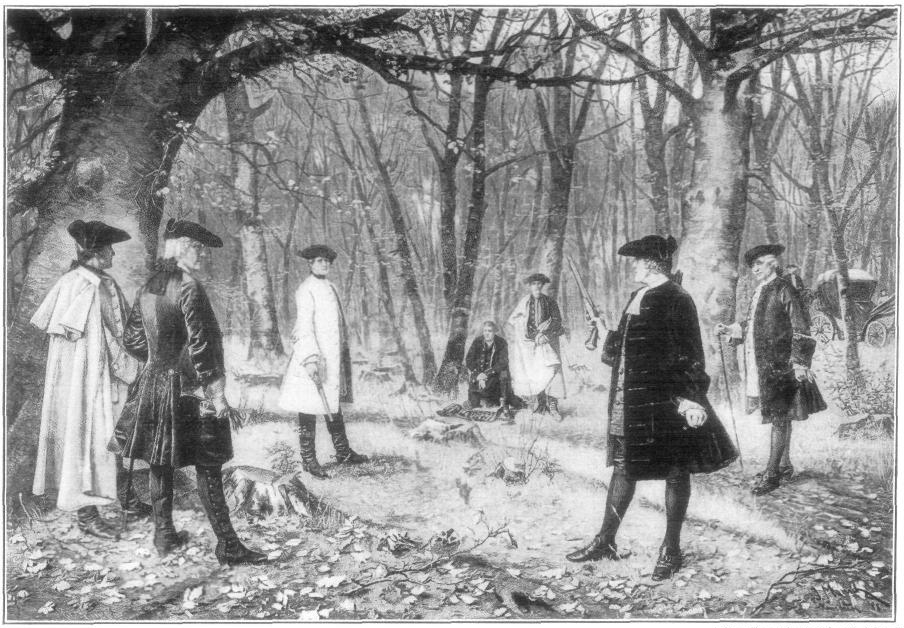
Alexander Hamilton fights his fatal duel with Aaron Burr. Illustration after painting "Ein Ehrenhandel" by Joseph Munsch (Austrian, 1832–1896)

By 1675, the Treaty of Westminster finalized the transfer and the area became part of the British colony of East Jersey, in the administrative district of Bergen Township. The county's seat was transferred to Hackensack in 1709, after Bergen County was expanded west. Small villages and farms supplied the burgeoning city of New York, across the river, notably with oysters from the vast beds in the Upper New York Bay, and fresh produce, sold at Weehawken Street, in Manhattan. During the American Revolutionary War, the area was under British control which included garrisons at Bulls Ferry and the fort at Bergen Neck. Colonialist troops used the heights to observe enemy movements. The Battle of Paulus Hook, a surprise raid on a British fortification in 1779, was seen as a victory and morale booster for revolutionary forces. Many downtown Jersey City streets bear the name of military figures Mercer, Greene, Wayne, and Varick among them. Weehawken became notorious for duels, including the nation's most famous between Alexander Hamilton and Aaron Burr in 1804. Border conflicts for control of the waterfront with New York (which claimed jurisdiction to the high water line and the granting of ferry concessions) restricted development though some urbanization took place in at Paulus Hook and Hoboken, which became a vacation spot for well-off New Yorkers. The Morris Canal, early steam railroads, and the development of New York Harbor stimulated further growth. In September 1840, Hudson County was created by separation from Bergen County and annexation of some Essex County lands, namely New Barbadoes Neck. During the 19th century, Hudson played an integral role in the Underground Railroad, with four routes converging in Jersey City.

=== Boundaries ===
Most of Hudson County, apart from West Hudson, was part of Bergen Township, which dates back to 1661 and was formally created by an act of the New Jersey Legislature on February 21, 1798, as one of the first group of 104 townships formed in New Jersey, while the area was still a part of Bergen County. As originally constituted, Bergen Township included the area between the Hudson River on the east, the Hackensack River to the west, south to Constable Hook/Bergen Point and north to the present-day Hudson-Bergen border. For the next 127 years civic borders within the county took many forms, until they were finalized with the creation of Union City in 1925.

The City of Jersey was incorporated by an act of the New Jersey Legislature on January 28, 1820, from portions of Bergen Township. The city was reincorporated on January 23, 1829, and again on February 22, 1838, at which time it became completely independent of Bergen Township and was given its present name. On February 22, 1840, it became part of the newly created Hudson County. As Jersey City grew, several neighboring communities were annexed: Van Vorst Township (March 18, 1851), Bergen City and Hudson City (both on May 2, 1870), and Greenville Township (February 4, 1873).

North Bergen was incorporated as a township on April 10, 1843, by an act of the New Jersey Legislature, from Bergen Township. Portions of the township have been taken to form Hoboken Township (April 9, 1849, now the City of Hoboken), Hudson Town (April 12, 1852, later part of Hudson City), Hudson City (April 11, 1855, later annexed by Jersey City), Guttenberg (formed within the township on March 9, 1859, and set off as an independent municipality on April 1, 1878), Weehawken (March 15, 1859), Union Township and West Hoboken Township (both created on February 28, 1861), Union Hill town (March 29, 1864), and Secaucus (March 12, 1900).

Hoboken was established in 1804, and formed as a township on April 9, 1849, from portions of North Bergen Township and incorporated as a full-fledged city, and in a referendum held on March 29, 1855, ratified an Act of the New Jersey Legislature signed the previous day, and the City of Hoboken was born.

Weehawken was formed as a township by an act of the New Jersey Legislature on March 15, 1859, from portions of Hoboken and North Bergen. A portion of the township was ceded to Hoboken in 1874. Additional territory was annexed in 1879 from West Hoboken.

West New York was incorporated as a town by an act of the New Jersey Legislature on July 8, 1898, replacing Union Township, based on the results of a referendum held three days earlier.

Kearny was originally formed as a township by an act of the New Jersey Legislature on April 8, 1867, from portions of Harrison Township. Portions of the township were taken on July 3, 1895, to form East Newark. Kearny was incorporated as a town on January 19, 1899, based on the results of a referendum held two days earlier.

Bayonne was originally formed as a township on April 1, 1861, from portions of Bergen Township. Bayonne was reincorporated as a city by an act of the New Jersey Legislature on March 10, 1869, replacing Bayonne Township, subject to the results of a referendum held nine days later.

Soon after the Civil War the idea of uniting all of the towns of Hudson County in one municipality of Jersey City began to gain favor. In 1868 a bill for submitting the question of consolidation of all of Hudson County to the voters was presented to the Board of Chosen Freeholders (now known as the Board of County Commissioners). The bill did not include the western towns of Harrison and Kearny but included all towns east of the Hackensack River.

The bill was approved by the State legislature on April 2, 1869, and the special election was scheduled for October 5, 1869. An element of the bill provided that only contiguous towns could be consolidated. The results of the election were as follows:

Municipality	Votes for	% for	Votes against	% against
Bayonne	100	28.57%	250	71.43%
Bergen	815	88.30%	108	11.70%
Greenville	24	12.12%	174	87.88%
Hoboken	176	16.46%	893	83.54%
Hudson City	1,320	85.71%	220	14.29%
Jersey City	2,220	70.90%	911	29.10%
North Bergen	80	26.23%	225	73.77%
Union Hill	123	53.95%	105	46.05%
Union Township	140	68.29%	65	31.71%
Weehawken	0	00.00%	44	100.00%
West Hoboken	95	27.07%	256	72.93%
Total	5,093	61.04%	3,251	38.96%

While a majority of the voters approved the merger, only Jersey City, Hudson and Bergen could be consolidated since they were the only contiguous approving towns. Both the Town of Union and Union Township could not be included due to the dissenting vote of West Hoboken which lay between them and Hudson City. On March 17, 1870, Jersey City, Hudson City, and Bergen merged into Jersey City. Only three years later the present outline of Jersey City was completed when Greenville agreed to merge into the Greater Jersey City.

On July 5, 1898, the residents of Union Township passed a referendum to incorporate as the town of West New York, which became effective on July 8, 1898. With the creation of West New York, Union Township was dissolved.

On January 1, 1925, Union City was incorporated as a city by an act of the New Jersey Legislature, replacing both Union Hill and West Hoboken Township.

=== Urbanization and immigration ===
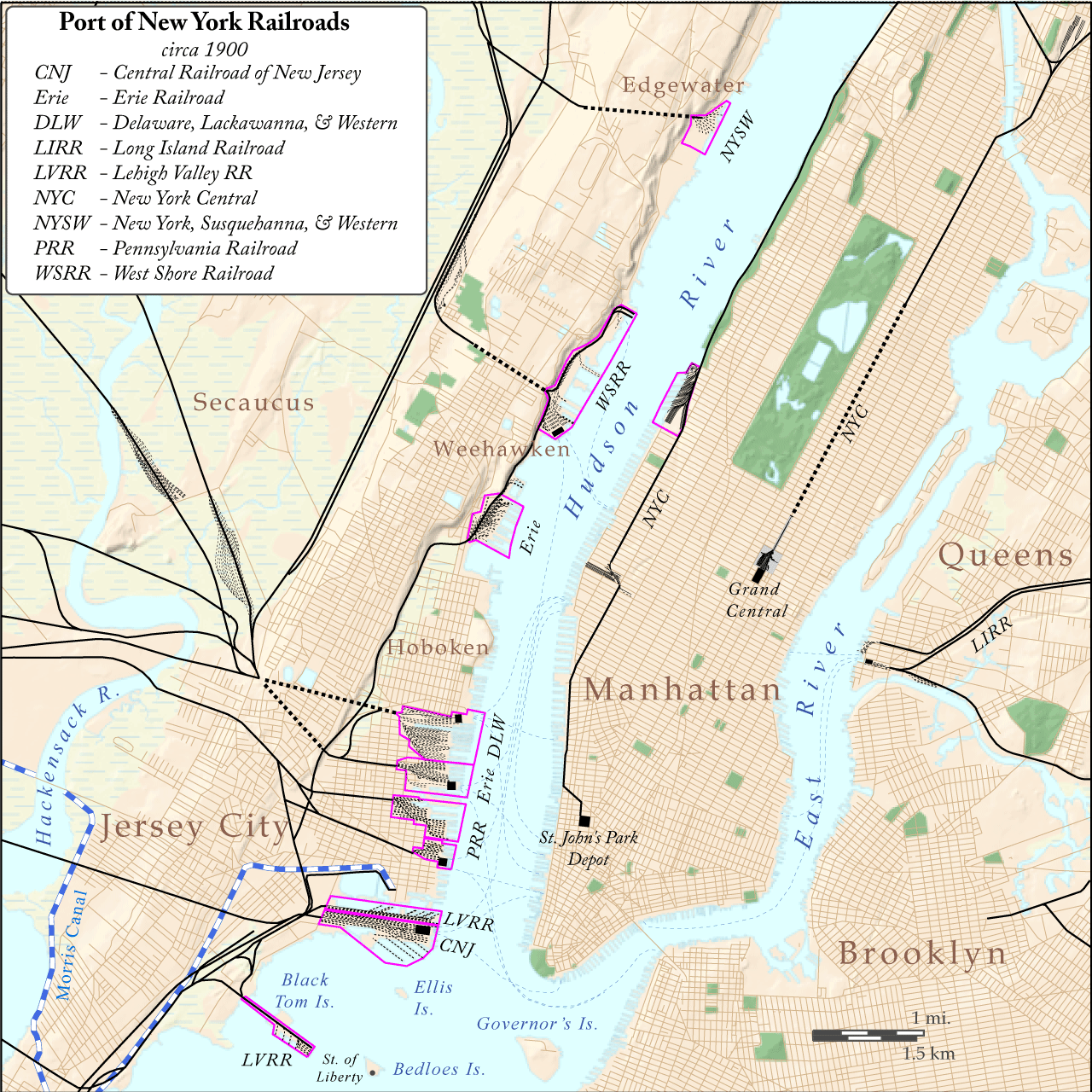
Hudson Waterfront, circa 1900

During the latter half of the 19th and early part of the 20th centuries, Hudson experienced intense industrial, commercial and residential growth. Construction, first of ports, and later railroad terminals, in Jersey City, Bayonne, Hoboken, and Weehawken (which significantly altered the shoreline with landfill) fueled much of the development. European immigration, notably German-language speakers and Irish (many fleeing famine) initiated a population boom that would last for several decades.

Neighborhoods grew as farms, estates, and other holdings were sub-divided for housing, civic and religious architecture. Streets (some with trolley lines) were laid out. Stevens Institute of Technology and Saint Peter's University were established.

Before the opening, in 1910, of the Pennsylvania Railroad's North River Tunnels under the Hudson, trains terminated on the west bank of the river, requiring passengers and cargo to travel by ferry or barge to New York. Transfer to the Hudson and Manhattan Railroad tubes (now PATH) became possible upon its opening in 1908. Hoboken Terminal, a national historic landmark originally built in 1907 by the Delaware, Lackawanna and Western Railroad to replace the previous one, is the only one of five major rail/ferry terminals that once dotted the waterfront still in operation. West Shore Railroad Terminal in Weehawken, Erie Railroad's Pavonia Terminal and Pennsylvania Railroad's Exchange Place in Jersey City were all razed.

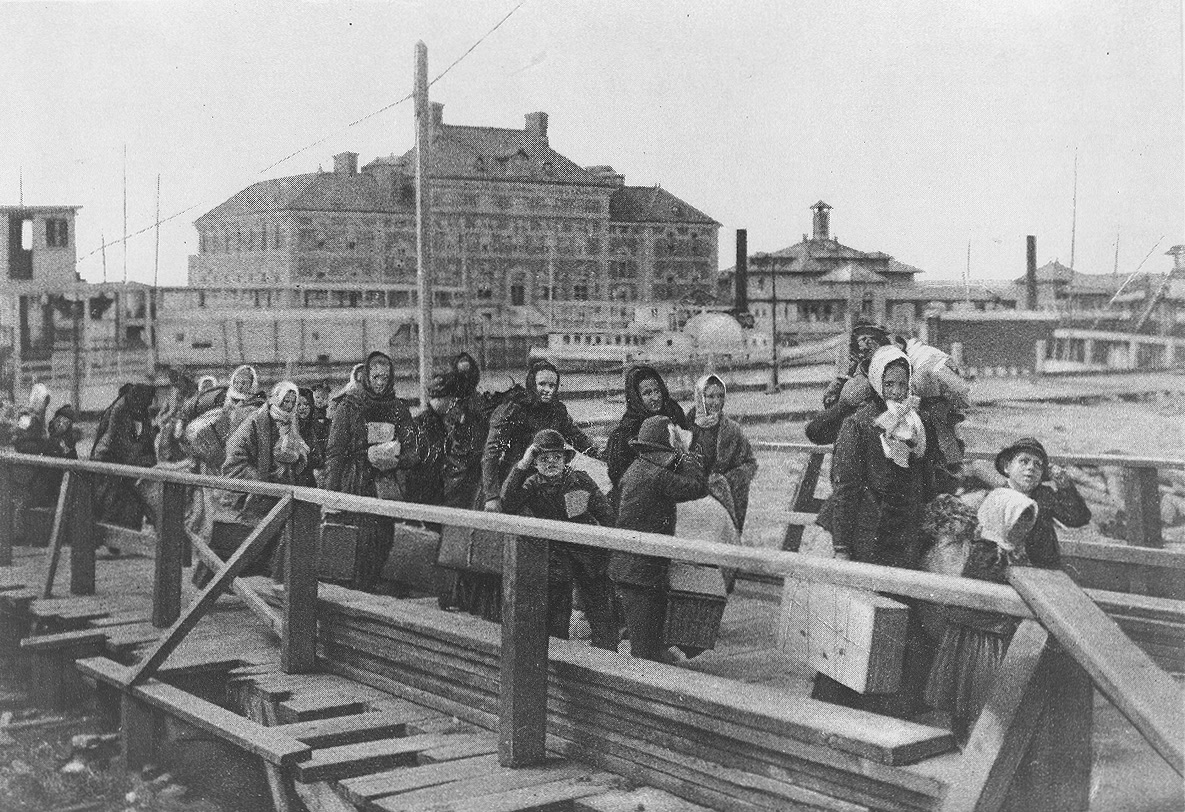
Immigrants arriving at Ellis Island, 1902

Central Railroad of New Jersey's Communipaw Terminal, across a small strait from Ellis Island and the Statue of Liberty, played a crucial role in the massive immigration of the period, with many newly arrived departing the station to embark on their lives in America. Many, though, decided to stay, taking jobs on the docks, the railroads, the factories, the refineries, and in the sweatshops and skyscrapers of Manhattan. Many manufacturers, whose names read as a "Who's Who" in American industry established a presence, including Colgate, Dixon Ticonderoga, Maxwell House, Standard Oil, and Bethlehem Steel.

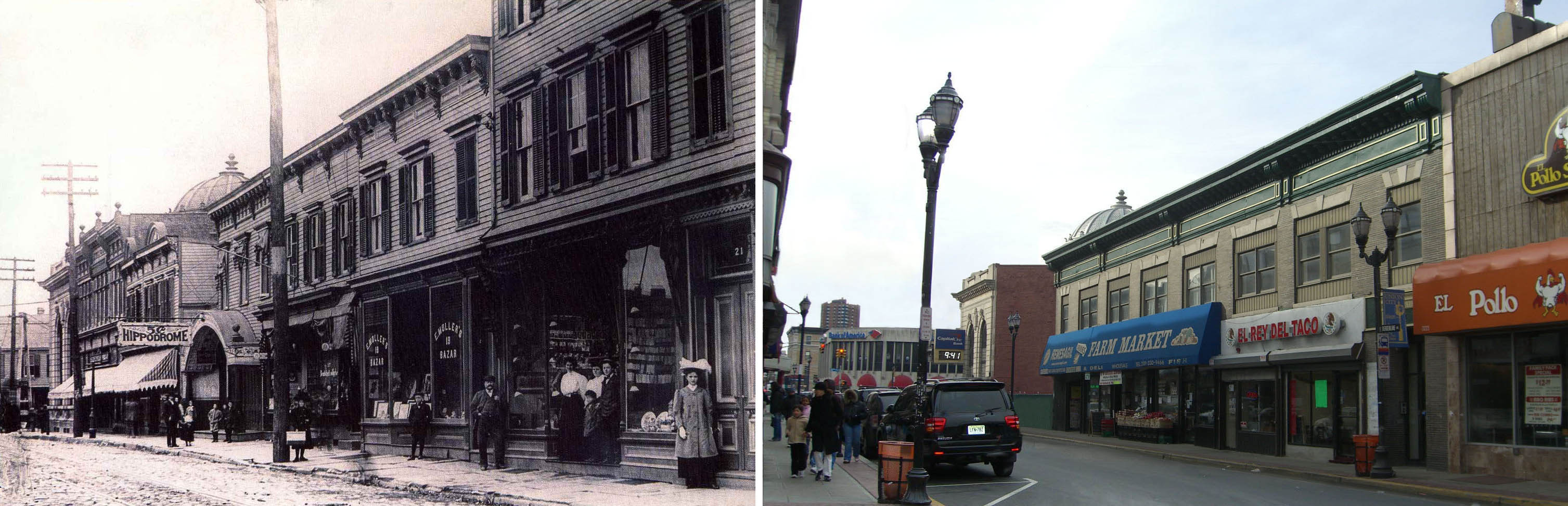
Bergenline Avenue in Union City, then and now: Facing south toward 32nd Street, circa 1900 (left), and in 2010 (right)

North Hudson, particularly Union City, became the schiffli "embroidery capital of America". The industry included businesses that provided embroidery machines and parts, fabrics, thread, embroidery designs, dying, chemical lace etching, and bleaching. There were hundreds of small shops, each with one or a few machines, producing a wide array of products. Finished embroidery supplied the garment and home goods industries.

Secaucus boasted numerous pig farms and rendering plants. It was during this period that much of the housing stock, namely one and two family homes and low-rise apartment buildings, was built; municipal boundaries finalized, neighborhoods established. Commercial corridors such as Bergenline, Central, Newark and Ocean Avenues came into prominence. Journal Square became a business, shopping, and entertainment mecca, home to The Jersey Journal, after which it is named, and movie palaces such as Loew's Jersey Theater and The Stanley.

=== World Wars and New Deal ===
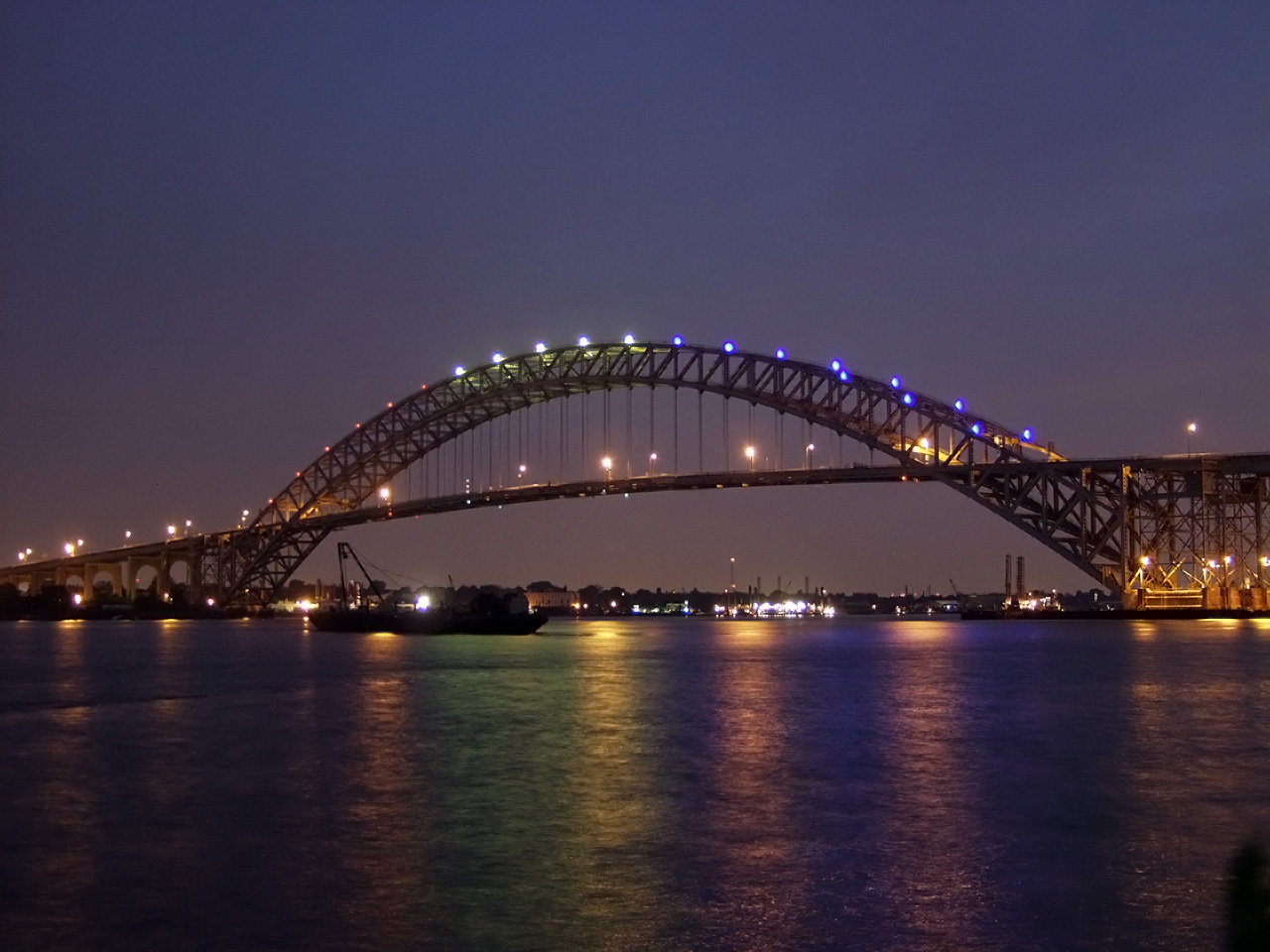
Bayonne Bridge at sunset

New Jersey-New York border in the newly constructed Holland Tunnel in 1927

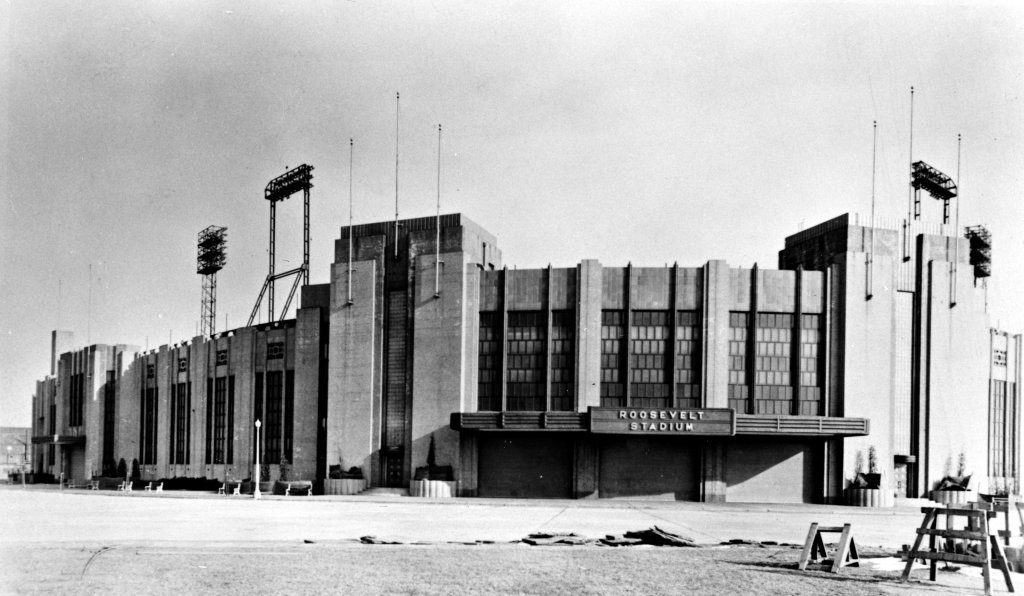
Roosevelt Stadium entrance circa 1940

Upon entry into World War I, the US government took over control of the Hamburg-American Line piers in Hoboken under eminent domain, and Hudson became the major point of embarkation for more than three million soldiers, known as "doughboys". In 1916, an act of sabotage literally and figuratively shook the region when German agents set off bombs at the munitions depot in New York Bay at Black Tom. The forerunner of Port Authority of New York and New Jersey was established on April 30, 1921. Huge transportation projects opened between the wars: The Holland Tunnel in 1927, The Bayonne Bridge in 1931, and The Lincoln Tunnel in 1937, allowing vehicular travel between New Jersey and New York City to bypass the waterfront. Hackensack River crossings, notably the Pulaski Skyway, were also built. What was to become New Jersey City University opened. Major Works Progress Administration projects included the construction of stadiums in Jersey City and Union City. Both were named for President Franklin D. Roosevelt, who attended the opening of the largest project of them all, The Jersey City Medical Center, a massive complex built in the Art Deco Style. During this era, the "Hudson County Democratic Machine", known for its cronyism and corruption, with Jersey City mayor Frank Hague at its head was at its most powerful. Industries in Hudson were crucial to the war effort during WWII, including the manufacture PT boats by Elco in Bayonne. Military Ocean Terminal at Bayonne (MOTBY) was opened in 1942 as a U.S. military base and remained in operation until 1999.

=== Post-war years ===
After the war maritime and manufacturing industries still dominated the local economy, and union membership provided guarantees of good pay packages. Though some returning servicemen took advantage of GI housing bills and moved to close by suburbs, many with strong ethnic and familial ties chose to stay. Baseball legend Jackie Robinson made his minor league debut at Roosevelt Stadium and "broke" the baseball color line. Much of Hudson County experienced the phenomenon of ethnic/economic groups leaving and being replaced by others, as was typical of most urban communities of the New York Bay region. When the big businesses decided to follow them or vice versa, Hudson County's socioeconomic differences became more profound. Old economic underpinnings disintegrated. Attempts were made to stabilize the population by demolishing so-called slums and build subsidized middle-income housing and the pockets of so-called "good neighborhoods" came in conflict with those that went into decline. Riots occurred in Jersey City in 1964.

Lower property values allowed the next wave of immigrants, many from Latin America, to rent or buy in the county. North Hudson, particularly Union City, saw many émigrés fleeing the Cuban revolution take up residence. Unlike other urban industrial areas of comparable size, age and density, North Hudson did not experience marked urban decay or a crime wave during the late 20th century, its population and economic base remaining basically stable, in part, because of its good housing stock, tightly knit neighborhoods and satisfactory schools systems.

=== Pre/post-millennium ===
The county since the mid-1990s has seen much real estate speculation and development and a population increase, as many new residents purchase existing housing stock as well as condominiums in high- and mid-rise developments, many along the waterfront. What had started as a gentrification in the 1980s became a full-blown "redevelopment" of the area as many suburbanites, transplanted Americans, internationals, and immigrants (most focused on opportunities in NY/NJ region and proximity to Manhattan) began to make the "Jersey" side of the Hudson their home, and the "real-estate boom" of the era encouraged many to seek investment opportunities. The exploitation of certain parts of the waterfront and other brownfields led to commercial development as well, especially along former rail yards. Hudson felt the short- and long-term impact of the destruction of the World Trade Center intensely: its proximity to lower Manhattan made it a place to evacuate to, many residents who worked there lost their jobs (or their lives), and many companies sought office space across the river. Re-zoning, the Hudson-Bergen Light Rail, and New Jersey State land-use policy of transit villages have further spurred construction. Though very urban and with some of the highest residential densities in the United States, the Hudson communities have remained fragmented, due in part to New Jersey's long history of home rule in local government; geographical factors such as Hudson River inlets/canals, the cliffs of the New Jersey Palisades and rail lines; and ethnic/demographic differences in the population. As the county sees more development this traditional perception is challenged.

== Demographics ==
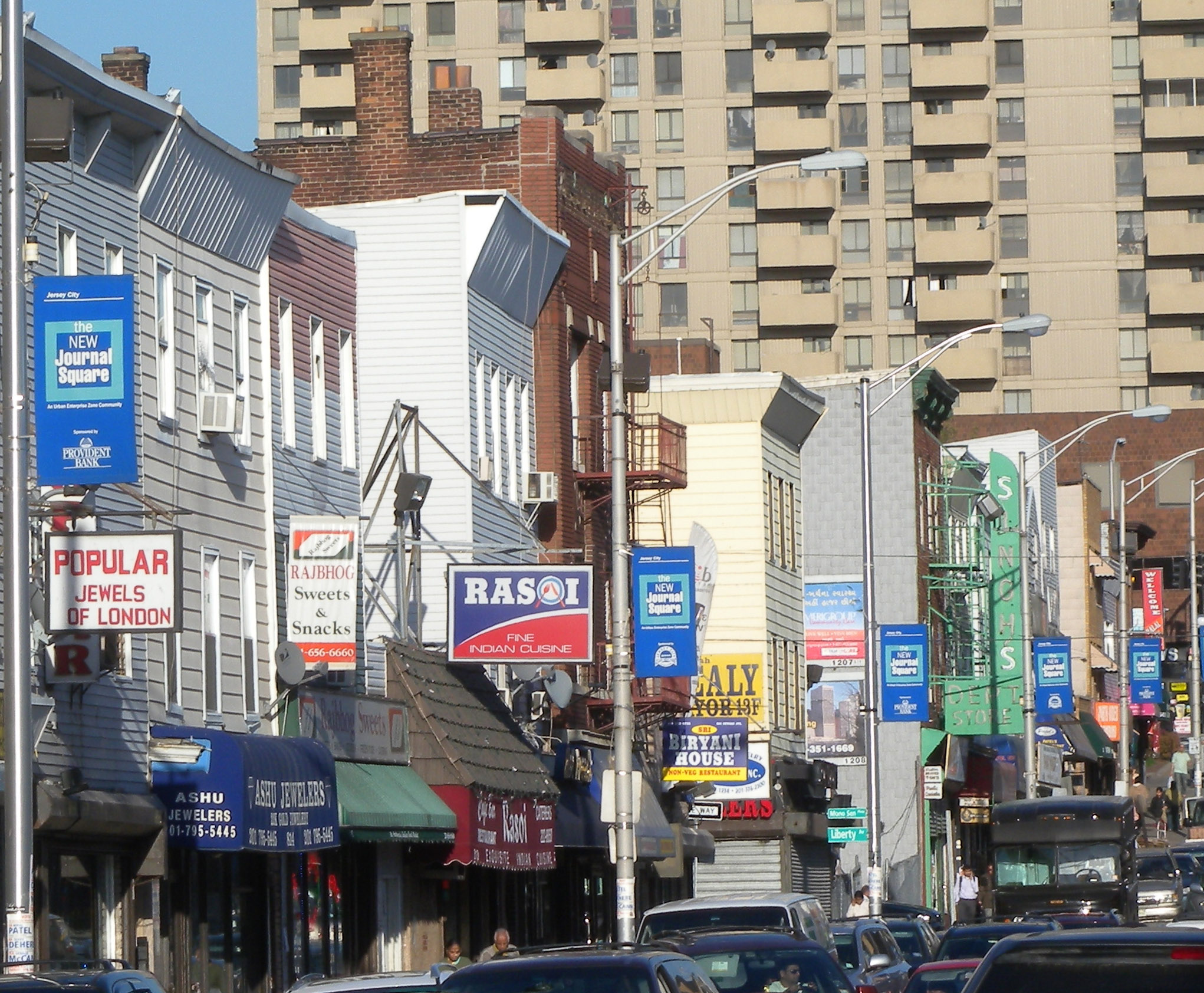
India Square, Jersey City, known as "Bombaytown" or "Little Bombay", is home to the highest concentration of Asian Indians in the Western Hemisphere.

Historical population
Census	Pop.	Note	%±
1840	9,483		—
1850	21,822		130.1%
1860	62,717		187.4%
1870	129,067		105.8%
1880	187,944		45.6%
1890	275,126		46.4%
1900	386,048		40.3%
1910	537,231		39.2%
1920	629,154		17.1%
1930	690,730		9.8%
1940	652,040		−5.6%
1950	647,437		−0.7%
1960	610,734		−5.7%
1970	607,839		−0.5%
1980	556,972		−8.4%
1990	553,099		−0.7%
2000	608,975		10.1%
2010	634,266		4.2%
2020	724,854		14.3%
2025 (est.)	735,033		1.4%
Historical sources: 1790-1990; 1970-2010 2000; 2010-2019 2020

Hudson County is the most densely populated county in New Jersey and the sixth-most densely populated county in the United States, with 15,691.5 inhabitants per square mile (6,058.5/km^{2}) as of the 2020 census. The only city in Hudson County among the 100 most populous cities in the United States was Jersey City, which was ranked 77th in the United States Census Bureau's rankings based on the 2016 population estimate.

Of municipalities with over 50,000 people, Union City is the most densely populated in the United States, while several Hudson County municipalities are among the most densely populated in the United States as well as worldwide. Guttenburg is the most densely populated municipality in the United States.

North Hudson has the second-largest Cuban American population in the United States behind Miami. Jersey City is the 21st-most ethnically diverse city in the United States and the most ethnically diverse on the East Coast of the United States. Hudson has three communities on the list of the 100 cities (population 5,000 and up) with the highest percent of foreign-born residents: West New York (65.2%), Union City (58.7%), and Guttenberg (48.7%) Hudson County has the smallest proportion of persons over age 65 in New Jersey.

=== Racial and ethnic composition ===
Hudson County, New Jersey – Racial and ethnic composition Note: the US Census treats Hispanic/Latino as an ethnic category. This table excludes Latinos from the racial categories and assigns them to a separate category. Hispanics/Latinos may be of any race.
Race / Ethnicity (NH = Non-Hispanic)	Pop 1980	Pop 1990	Pop 2000	Pop 2010	Pop 2020	% 1980	% 1990	% 2000	% 2010	% 2020
White alone (NH)	325,584	262,077	215,216	195,510	206,530	58.46%	47.38%	35.34%	30.82%	28.49%
Black or African American alone (NH)	66,368	69,856	74,040	71,315	71,385	11.92%	12.63%	12.16%	11.24%	9.85%
Native American or Alaska Native alone (NH)	568	960	902	935	1,069	0.10%	0.17%	0.15%	0.15%	0.15%
Asian alone (NH)	15,213	35,046	56,370	83,825	123,424	2.73%	6.34%	9.26%	13.22%	17.03%
Native Hawaiian or Pacific Islander alone (NH)	x	x	208	176	233	x	x	0.03%	0.03%	0.03%
Other race alone (NH)	4,076	1,695	3,658	4,251	9,210	0.73%	0.31%	0.60%	0.67%	1.27%
Mixed race or Multiracial (NH)	x	x	16,458	10,401	19,984	x	x	2.70%	1.64%	2.76%
Hispanic or Latino (any race)	145,163	183,465	242,123	267,853	293,019	26.06%	33.17%	39.76%	42.23%	40.42%
Total	556,972	553,099	608,975	634,266	724,854	100.00%	100.00%	100.00%	100.00%	100.00%

==== Racial / Ethnic Profile of places in Hudson County, New Jersey ====
Racial / Ethnic Profile of places in Hudson County, New Jersey (2020 Census)
Following is a table of towns and census designated places in Hudson County, New Jersey. Data for the United States (with and without Puerto Rico), the state of New Jersey, and Hudson County itself have been included for comparison purposes.
The majority racial/ethnic group is coded per the key below.

Majority minority with no dominant group
Majority White
Majority Black
Majority Hispanic
Majority Asian

Racial and ethnic composition of places in Hudson County, New Jersey (2020 Census) (NH = Non-Hispanic) Note: the US Census treats Hispanic/Latino as an ethnic category. This table excludes Latinos from the racial categories and assigns them to a separate category. Hispanics/Latinos may be of any race.
Place	Designation	Total Population	White alone (NH)	%	Black or African American alone (NH)	%	Native American or Alaska Native alone (NH)	%	Asian alone (NH)	%	Pacific Islander alone (NH)	%	Other race alone (NH)	%	Mixed race or Multiracial (NH)	%	Hispanic or Latino (any race)	%
United States of America (50 states and D.C.)	x	331,449,281	191,697,647	57.84%	39,940,338	12.05%	2,251,699	0.68%	19,618,719	5.92%	622,018	0.19%	1,689,833	0.51%	13,548,983	4.09%	62,080,044	18.73%
United States of America (50 states, D.C., and Puerto Rico)	x	334,735,155	191,722,195	57.28%	39,944,624	11.93%	2,252,011	0.67%	19,621,465	5.86%	622,109	0.19%	1,692,341	0.51%	13,551,323	4.05%	65,329,087	19.52%
New Jersey	State	9,288,994	4,816,381	51.85%	1,154,142	12.42%	11,206	0.12%	942,921	10.15%	1,944	0.02%	70,354	0.76%	289,471	3.12%	2,002,575	21.56%
Hudson County	County	724,854	206,530	28.49%	71,385	9.85%	1,069	0.15%	123,424	17.03%	233	0.03%	9,210	1.27%	19,984	2.76%	293,019	40.42%
Bayonne	City	71,686	32,697	45.61%	7,116	9.93%	80	0.11%	7,011	9.78%	17	0.02%	638	0.89%	2,026	2.83%	22,101	30.83%
East Newark	Borough	2,594	511	19.70%	54	2.08%	2	0.08%	257	9.91%	0	0.00%	82	3.16%	69	2.66%	1,619	62.41%
Guttenberg	Town	12,017	2,426	20.19%	343	2.85%	7	0.06%	1,064	8.85%	3	0.02%	122	1.02%	184	1.53%	7,868	65.47%
Harrison	Town	19,450	4,690	24.11%	722	3.71%	18	0.09%	4,946	25.43%	0	0.00%	529	2.72%	786	4.04%	7,759	39.89%
Hoboken	City	60,419	40,657	67.29%	2,106	3.49%	29	0.05%	6,518	10.79%	50	0.08%	437	0.72%	2,080	3.44%	8,542	14.14%
Jersey City	City	292,449	69,624	23.81%	54,199	18.53%	638	0.22%	81,425	27.84%	101	0.03%	4,204	1.44%	9,481	3.24%	72,777	24.89%
Kearny	Town	41,999	14,889	35.45%	1,246	2.97%	37	0.09%	2,034	4.84%	23	0.05%	1,285	3.06%	2,020	4.81%	20,465	48.73%
North Bergen	Township	63,361	11,235	17.73%	1,403	2.21%	70	0.11%	4,269	6.74%	14	0.02%	612	0.97%	858	1.35%	44,900	70.86%
Secaucus	Town	22,181	8,760	39.49%	922	4.16%	23	0.10%	7,167	32.31%	3	0.01%	122	0.55%	484	2.18%	4,700	21.19%
Union City	City	68,589	6,855	9.99%	1,355	1.98%	99	0.14%	2,394	3.49%	7	0.01%	600	0.87%	770	1.12%	56,509	82.39%
Weehawken	Township	17,197	7,537	43.83%	685	3.98%	15	0.09%	2,594	15.08%	7	0.04%	132	0.77%	562	3.27%	5,665	32.94%
West New York	Town	52,912	6,649	12.57%	1,234	2.33%	51	0.10%	3,745	7.08%	8	0.02%	447	0.84%	664	1.25%	40,114	75.81%

=== 2020 census ===
As of the 2020 census, the county had a population of 724,854, the median age was 34.8 years, 19.6% of residents were under age 18, 11.4% were 65 or older, and for every 100 females there were 97.6 males (96.0 males per 100 females age 18 and over).

The racial makeup of the county was 34.3% White, 11.0% Black or African American, 1.0% American Indian and Alaska Native, 17.2% Asian, 0.1% Native Hawaiian and Pacific Islander, 22.1% from some other race, and 14.4% from two or more races. Hispanic or Latino residents of any race comprised 40.4% of the population.

One hundred percent of residents lived in urban areas, while less than 0.1% resided in rural areas.

There were 289,408 households in the county, of which 28.9% had children under the age of 18 living in them. Of all households, 37.0% were married-couple households, 23.3% were households with a male householder and no spouse or partner present, and 31.6% were households with a female householder and no spouse or partner present. About 29.8% of all households were made up of individuals and 8.3% had someone living alone who was 65 years of age or older.

There were 312,706 housing units, of which 7.5% were vacant. Among occupied housing units, 27.6% were owner-occupied and 72.4% were renter-occupied. The homeowner vacancy rate was 2.1% and the rental vacancy rate was 5.3%.

As of 2020, the county's median household income was $78,808, and the median family income was $76,019. About 13.9% of the population were below the poverty line, including 22.2% of those under age 18 and 17.4% of those age 65 or over.

=== 2010 census ===
The 2010 United States census counted 634,266 people, 246,437 households, and 148,355 families in the county. The population density was 13,731.4 per square mile (5,301.7/km^{2}). There were 270,335 housing units at an average density of 5,852.5 per square mile (2,259.7/km^{2}). The racial makeup was 54.05% (342,792) White, 13.23% (83,925) Black or African American, 0.64% (4,081) Native American, 13.39% (84,924) Asian, 0.05% (344) Pacific Islander, 14.25% (90,373) from other races, and 4.39% (27,827) from two or more races. Hispanic or Latino people of any race were 42.23% (267,853) of the population.

Of the 246,437 households, 27.6% had children under the age of 18; 37.8% were married couples living together; 16.4% had a female householder with no husband present and 39.8% were non-families. Of all households, 29.9% were made up of individuals and 8.3% had someone living alone who was 65 years of age or older. The average household size was 2.54 and the average family size was 3.2.

20.7% of the population were under the age of 18, 10% from 18 to 24, 36% from 25 to 44, 22.9% from 45 to 64, and 10.4% who were 65 years of age or older. The median age was 34.2 years. For every 100 females, the population had 97.9 males. For every 100 females ages 18 and older there were 95.9 males.

=== Community diversity ===
Hudson County is a major port of entry for immigration to the United States and a major employment center at the approximate core of the New York City metropolitan region. Given its proximity to Manhattan, Hudson County has evolved a globally cosmopolitan ambience of its own, demonstrating a robust and growing demographic and cultural diversity with respect to metrics including nationality, religion, race, and domiciliary partnership. Cuba, Dominican Republic, Ecuador, the Philippines, and India are the five most common nations of birth for foreign-born Hudson County residents. Jersey City is one of the most ethnically diverse cities in the world.

==== Latin American ====
There were an estimated 273,611 Hispanic Americans in Hudson County, according to the 2013 American Community Survey, representing a 2.1% increase from 267,853 Hispanic Americans enumerated in the 2010 United States Census. Several municipalities in northern Hudson County are listed among those places in the United States with the highest population densities, with several towns more dense overall than adjacent New York City. Numerous towns on the Hudson Palisades in northern Hudson County have populations where more than 50% of the residents are foreign-born, often with a Hispanic majority.

===== Puerto Rican American =====
There were an estimated 58,197 Puerto Rican Americans in Hudson County, according to the 2013 American Community Survey, representing a 3.1% increase from 56,436 Puerto Rican Americans enumerated in the 2010 United States Census.

===== Cuban American =====
There were an estimated 28,900 Cuban Americans in Hudson County, according to the 2013 American Community Survey, representing a 0.9% increase from 28,652 Cuban Americans enumerated in the 2010 United States Census. The Cuban Day Parade of New Jersey, since its inception at the millennium, has run along Bergenline Avenue and grown to be the centerpiece of large festivities which have taken place at Scheutzen Park or Celia Cruz Park.

==== European American ====
There were an estimated 194,192 non-Hispanic whites in Hudson County, according to the 2013 American Community Survey, representing a 0.7% decrease from 195,501 non-Hispanic whites enumerated in the 2010 United States Census.

===== Italian American =====
Italian Americans have historically played an important cultural role in Hudson County.

===== Western European American =====
Ever since the settling of New Netherland in the 1600s, comprising what is now the Gateway Region of northeastern New Jersey as well as portions of Downstate New York in the New York City metropolitan area, the Dutch and British, along with German and Irish Americans, have established an integral role in the subsequent long-term development of Hudson County over the centuries.

===== Irish American =====
Irish Americans, specifically Irish Catholics played a significant role in the politics of Jersey City. Many of the city's mayors were of Irish descent. The Greenville, Jersey City neighborhood was the center of the city's Irish community until the 1950s and early 1960s.

==== Asian American ====
There were an estimated 89,164 Asian Americans in Hudson County, according to the 2013 American Community Survey, representing a 5.0% increase from 84,924 Asian Americans enumerated in the 2010 United States Census.

===== Indian American =====
India Square, also known as "Little India" or "Little Bombay", home to the highest concentration of Asian Indians in the Western Hemisphere, is a rapidly growing Indian American ethnic enclave in Jersey City. This area has been home to the largest outdoor Navratri festivities in New Jersey as well as several Hindu temples; while an annual, color-filled spring Holi festival has taken place in Jersey City since 1992, centered upon India Square and attracting significant participation and international media attention. There were an estimated 39,477 Indian Americans in Hudson County, according to the 2013 American Community Survey, representing a 6.0% increase from 37,236 Indian Americans enumerated in the 2010 United States Census.

===== Filipino American =====
7% of Jersey City's population is Filipino. The Five Corners district is home to a thriving Filipino community and Jersey City's Little Manila, which is the second largest Asian American subgroup in the city. A variety of Filipino restaurants, shippers and freighters, doctors' officers, bakeries, stores, and an office of The Filipino Channel have made Newark Avenue their home. The largest Filipino-owned grocery store on the East Coast of the United States, Phil-Am Food, has been there since 1973. An array of Filipino-owned businesses can also be found at the section of West Side of Jersey City, where many of its residents are of Filipino descent. In 2006, a Red Ribbon pastry shop, one of the Philippines' most famous food chains, opened its first branch on the East Coast in the Garden State. Manila Avenue in Downtown Jersey City was named for the Philippine capital city because of the many Filipinos who built their homes on this street during the 1970s. A memorial, dedicated to the Filipino American veterans of the Vietnam War, was built in a small square on Manila Avenue. A park and statue dedicated to Jose P. Rizal, a national hero of the Philippines, exists in downtown Jersey City. Jersey City is the host of the annual Philippine-American Friendship Day Parade, an event that occurs yearly in June, on its last Sunday. The City Hall of Jersey City raises the Philippine flag in correlation to this event and as a tribute to the contributions of the Filipino community. The Santakrusan Procession along Manila Avenue has taken place since 1977. There were an estimated 21,622 Filipino Americans in Hudson County, according to the 2013 American Community Survey, representing a 4.8% increase from 20,638 Filipino Americans enumerated in the 2010 United States Census.

===== Chinese American =====
Hudson County, highly accessible to Lower Manhattan in New York City and its Chinatown by rapid transit, was home to an estimated 13,381 Chinese Americans, according to the 2013 American Community Survey, representing a notably rapid growth of 19.1% from the 11,239 Chinese Americans enumerated in the 2010 United States Census.

==== African American ====
There were an estimated 83,576 African Americans in Hudson County, according to the 2013 American Community Survey, representing a 0.4% decrease from 83,925 African Americans enumerated in the 2010 United States Census. However, modest growth in the African immigrant population, most notably the growing Nigerian American population in Jersey City, is partially offsetting the decline in Hudson County's American-born black population, which as a whole has been experiencing an exodus from northern New Jersey to the Southern United States.

==== Arab American ====
Arab Americans numbered an estimated 14,518 individuals in Hudson County in the 2012 American Community Survey, representing 2.3% of the county's total population, the second highest percentage in New Jersey after Passaic County. Arab Americans are most concentrated in Jersey City and Bayonne, led by Egyptian Americans, including the largest population of Coptic Christians in the United States.

==== Muslim American ====
Hudson County's Muslim American population includes a significant Latino contingent comprising adherents converting from other religious affiliations.

==== Jewish American ====
A growing Jewish American population has been noted in Hudson County, particularly in Jersey City. A significant Jewish presence has also been established in Bayonne.

==== Same-sex couples ====
There were 2,726 same-sex couples in Hudson County in 2010, second in New Jersey only to Essex County, prior to the commencement of same-sex marriages in New Jersey on October 21, 2013.

== Economy ==
The Bureau of Economic Analysis calculated that the county's gross domestic product was $41.7 billion (~$48.8 billion in 2025) in 2021, which was ranked fifth in the state and was a 5.7% increase from the prior year.

Various businesses and industries are headquartered or had their start in Hudson County. Secaucus is home to The Vitamin Shoppe, My Network TV's flagship station WWOR-TV, Red Bull New York, MLB Network, NBA Entertainment, Goya Foods, The Children's Place and Hartz Mountain. Jersey City is home to Verisk Analytics and WFMU 91.1FM (WMFU 90.1FM in the Hudson Valley), the longest running freeform radio station in the United States. Hoboken is the birthplace of the first Blimpie restaurant, and home to one of the headquarters of publisher John Wiley & Sons. In the 20th century, Union City was the "embroidery capital of the United States", the trademark of that industry appearing on that city's seal. Weehawken is home to the headquarters of NY Waterway, as well as offices for Swatch Group USA, UBS and Hartz Mountain.

Television producers had long held an attraction for New Jersey, and Hudson County in particular, due to the tax credits afforded such various productions. The HBO prison drama Oz was filmed in an old warehouse in Bayonne, with much of the series filmed around the now-defunct Military Ocean Terminal Base. The NBC drama Law and Order: Special Victims Unit filmed police station and courtroom scenes at NBC's Central Archives building in North Bergen, and filmed other scenes throughout the county, such as a 2010 episode filmed at the Meadowlands Parkway in Secaucus. The short-lived hospital drama Mercy filmed at a warehouse in Secaucus, a private residence in Weehawken and a public school in Jersey City. The Law and Order and Mercy productions left New Jersey for New York in 2010 after New Jersey Governor Chris Christie suspended the tax credits for film and television production for the fiscal year 2011 to close budget gaps.

== Government ==
=== County government ===
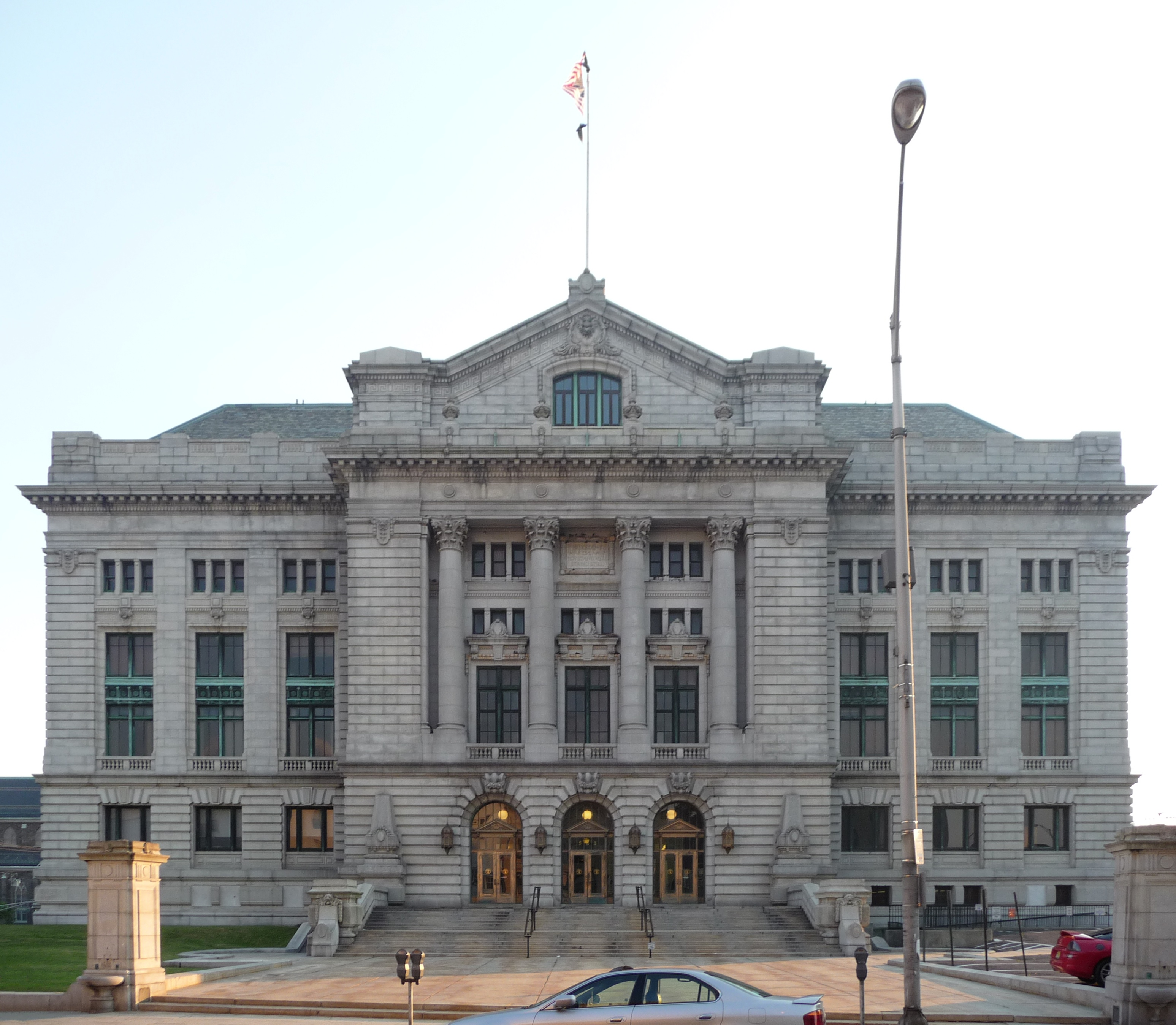
Justice William J. Brennan Jr. Courthouse in Jersey City

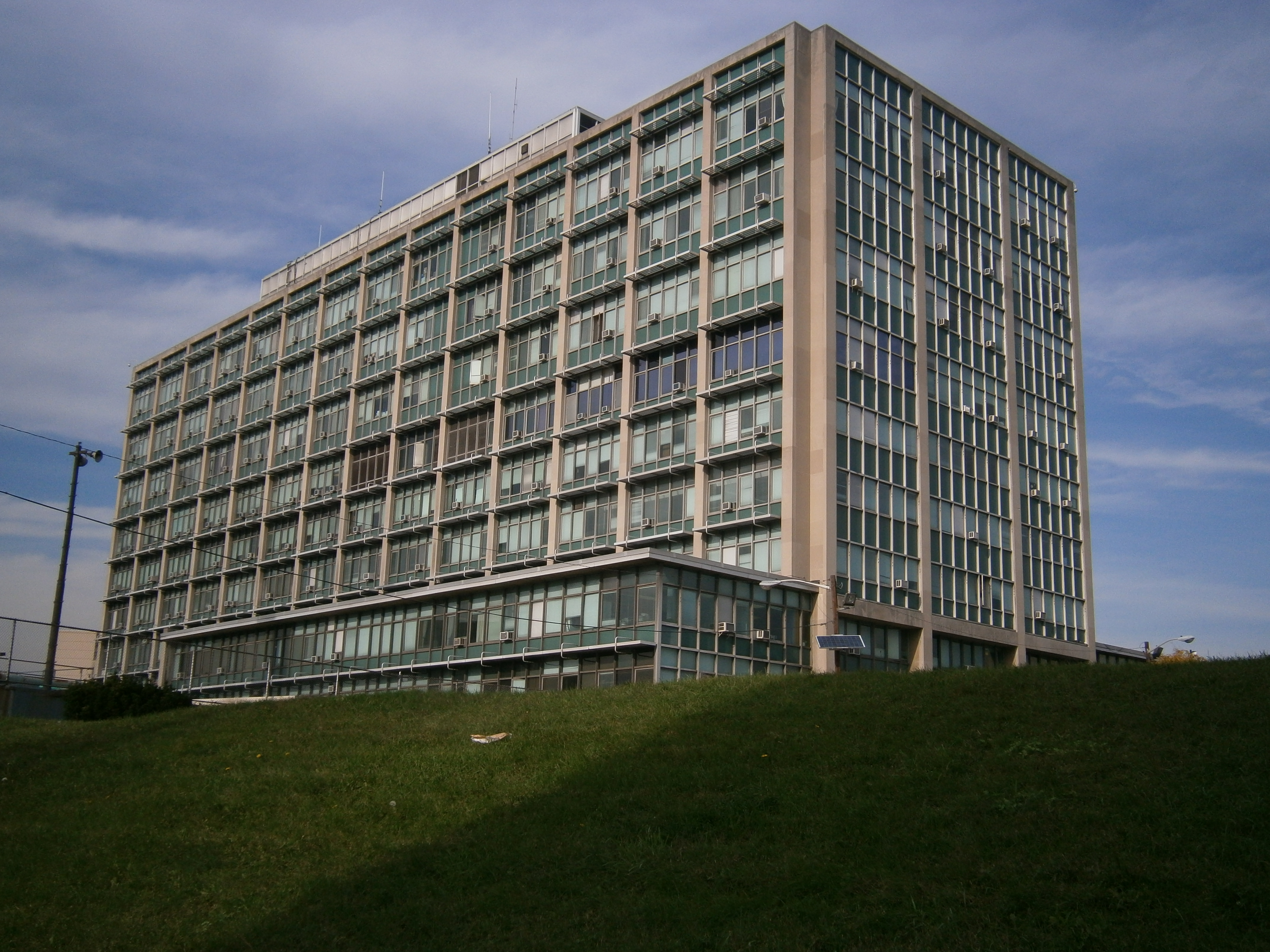
Hudson County Administration Building

Hudson County is governed by the Hudson County Executive and a nine-member Board of County Commissioners as a legislative body, who administers all county business. Hudson joins Atlantic, Bergen, Essex and Mercer counties as one of the 5 of 21 New Jersey counties with an elected executive. The County Executive is elected directly by the voters. The members of the Board of County Commissioners are elected concurrently to serve three-year terms as Commissioner, each representing a specified district which are equally proportioned based on population. Each year, in January, the Commissioners select one of their nine to serve as chair and one as Vice Chair for a period of one year. In 2016, commissioners were paid $43,714, the Commissioner Vice Chair received $45,754 and the Commissioner Chair was paid an annual salary of $46,774; the commissioner salaries in the county were the highest in the state. That year, the county executive was paid $151,299.

As of 2025, Hudson County's Hudson County Executive is Craig Guy (D, Jersey City), whose term of office expires December 31, 2027. Hudson County's Commissioners are (with terms for commissioners, chair and vice-chair ending every December 31):

District	Commissioner
1 - Bayonne and parts of Jersey City	Kenneth Kopacz (D, Bayonne, 2026)
2 - Western Jersey City	William O'Dea (D, Jersey City, 2026)
3 - South Eastern Jersey City	Vice Chair Jerry Walker (D, Jersey City, 2026)
4 - North Eastern Jersey City	Yraida Aponte-Lipski (D, Jersey City, 2026)
5 - Hoboken and parts of Jersey City	Chair Anthony L. Romano Jr. (D, Hoboken, 2026)
6 - Union City	Fanny J. Cedeño (D, Union City, 2026)
7 - Weehawken, West New York, and Gutenberg	Caridad Rodriguez (D, West New York, 2026)
8 - West New York, North Bergen, Secaucus	Robert Baselice (D, North Bergen 2026)
9 - Secaucus, Kearny, East Newark, Harrison	Albert J. Cifelli (D, Harrison, 2026)

Republicans have not won a countywide office since 1956, and have not won a commissioner seat since 1984. Pursuant to Article VII Section II of the New Jersey State Constitution, each county in New Jersey is required to have three elected administrative officials known as "constitutional officers." These officers are the County Clerk and County Surrogate (both elected for five-year terms of office) and the County Sheriff (elected for a three-year term). Hudson County is one of two counties statewide that has an elected Register of Deeds. Hudson County's constitutional officers and register are:

Title	Officer
County Clerk	E. Junior Maldonado (D, Jersey City, 2027)
Sheriff	James M. Davis (D, Bayonne, 2028)
Surrogate	Tilo E. Rivas (D, Jersey City, 2029)
Register	Jeffrey Dublin (D, Jersey City, 2026)

=== Law enforcement ===
Hudson County Sheriff's Office

Agency overview
- Formed: 1872
- Legal personality: Governmental: Government agency

Jurisdictional structure
- Operations jurisdiction: Hudson County, New Jersey, United States
- Population: 674,836
- General nature: Local civilian police

Operational structure
- Headquarters: 257 Cornelison Ave, Jersey City, NJ 07306
- Agency executive: James M. Davis (since 2026), Sheriff

Website
- Official website

The sheriff's office is the second-largest law enforcement agency in the county, with a staff of 300. The sheriff's headquarters are located at Hudson County Plaza. The Hudson County Correctional Facility is located in South Kearny. The Hudson County Prosecutor is Wayne Mello, who was nominated to the position by Governor of New Jersey Phil Murphy in 2025. Many county offices are located at Hudson County Plaza at 257 Cornelison Avenue in Jersey City. The Hudson County Meadowview Psychiatric Hospital is on County Avenue, Secaucus.

The county seat of Hudson County is located near Five Corners on Newark Avenue in Jersey City, northeast of Journal Square. The Hudson County Courthouse, and the adjacent Hudson County Administration Building, at 595 Newark Avenue, are home to various courts, agencies and departments. Hudson County constitutes Vicinage 6 of the New Jersey Superior Court and is seated at the Administration Building, with additional facilities at the Hudson County Courthouse; the Assignment Judge for Vicinage 6 is the Honorable David Katz The Hudson County court system consists of several municipal courts, including the busy Jersey City Court in addition to the Superior Court.

=== Federal representatives ===
Three Congressional Districts cover the county, including portions of the 8th, 9th, and 10th districts. For the 119th United States Congress, New Jersey's 8th congressional district is represented by Rob Menendez (D, Jersey City). For the 119th United States Congress, New Jersey's 9th congressional district is represented by Nellie Pou (D, North Haledon) For the 119th United States Congress, New Jersey's 10th congressional district is represented by LaMonica McIver (D, Newark).

=== State representatives ===
The 12 municipalities of Hudson County are in four legislative districts.

District	Senator	Assembly	Municipalities
29th	Teresa Ruiz (D)	Eliana Pintor Marin (D); Shanique Speight (D)	East Newark and Harrison. The remainder of this district includes portions of Essex County.
31st	Angela McKnight (D)	William Sampson (D); Jerry Walker (D)	Bayonne, Kearny, and a portion of Jersey City.
32nd	Raj Mukherji (D)	Ravi Bhalla (D); Katie Brennan (D)	Hoboken and a portion of Jersey City.
33rd	Brian Stack (D)	Gabe Rodriguez (D); Larry Wainstein (D)	Guttenberg, North Bergen, Secaucus, West New York, Union City, and Weehawken.

== Politics ==
Hudson County is a Democratic stronghold. It has only supported a Republican for president six times since 1896, all in large victories for Republicans nationwide. However, Democratic vote share and margins have been shrinking since 2016. In 2024, the Democratic margin was the smallest since 1992, and Democrats' 62.34% was the lowest for the party since 1992 as well. The county has backed a Republican for governor twice in its history. As of October 1, 2021, there were a total of 418,233 registered voters in Hudson County, of whom 230,912 (55.2%) were registered as Democrats, 44,736 (10.7%) were registered as Republicans and 136,327 (32.6%) were registered as unaffiliated. There were 6,258 voters (1.5%) registered to other parties.

US President election results

United States presidential election results for Hudson County, New Jersey
Year	Republican		Democratic		Third party(ies)	
Year	No.	%	No.	%	No.	%
1896	33,626	52.51%	28,133	43.94%	2,274	3.55%
1900	32,343	44.53%	38,022	52.35%	2,262	3.11%
1904	36,683	46.25%	38,021	47.94%	4,605	5.81%
1908	41,969	48.91%	39,634	46.19%	4,200	4.89%
1912	8,763	11.37%	40,517	52.55%	27,824	36.09%
1916	42,518	47.66%	44,663	50.07%	2,024	2.27%
1920	101,759	59.58%	62,637	36.67%	6,397	3.75%
1924	80,892	41.71%	91,094	46.97%	21,966	11.33%
1928	99,972	39.35%	153,009	60.22%	1,090	0.43%
1932	66,937	26.04%	184,676	71.85%	5,406	2.10%
1936	65,110	21.66%	233,390	77.65%	2,059	0.69%
1940	107,552	33.98%	208,429	65.85%	527	0.17%
1944	117,087	37.88%	191,354	61.90%	694	0.22%
1948	111,113	36.47%	182,979	60.06%	10,561	3.47%
1952	153,583	47.36%	161,469	49.79%	9,228	2.85%
1956	183,919	61.80%	107,098	35.99%	6,568	2.21%
1960	113,972	39.13%	174,754	59.99%	2,566	0.88%
1964	69,515	25.56%	200,051	73.55%	2,443	0.90%
1968	91,324	37.34%	124,939	51.09%	28,297	11.57%
1972	136,895	60.15%	87,977	38.65%	2,728	1.20%
1976	92,636	43.55%	116,241	54.64%	3,853	1.81%
1980	91,207	45.90%	95,622	48.13%	11,859	5.97%
1984	112,834	54.18%	94,304	45.29%	1,106	0.53%
1988	84,334	45.72%	98,507	53.40%	1,622	0.88%
1992	66,505	35.94%	99,799	53.93%	18,753	10.13%
1996	38,288	23.06%	116,121	69.95%	11,600	6.99%
2000	43,804	26.17%	118,206	70.63%	5,351	3.20%
2004	60,646	31.99%	127,447	67.24%	1,461	0.77%
2008	55,360	26.16%	154,140	72.84%	2,116	1.00%
2012	42,369	21.43%	153,108	77.45%	2,217	1.12%
2016	49,043	22.24%	163,917	74.32%	7,582	3.44%
2020	65,698	26.29%	181,452	72.62%	2,700	1.08%
2024	79,913	34.57%	144,765	62.62%	6,503	2.81%

Senate Class 1 election results

United States Senate election results for Hudson County, New Jersey1
Year	Republican		Democratic		Third party(ies)	
Year	No.	%	No.	%	No.	%
2024	64,050	30.81%	135,615	65.23%	8,239	3.96%
2018	36,087	20.84%	132,180	76.35%	4,863	2.81%
2012	32,876	18.64%	139,910	79.35%	3,545	2.01%
2006	27,536	23.32%	88,696	75.13%	1,832	1.55%
2000	43,820	27.32%	112,502	70.15%	4,062	2.53%
1994	34,211	32.84%	67,532	64.83%	2,430	2.33%
1988	65,092	37.04%	108,355	61.66%	2,270	1.29%
1982	40,766	28.97%	97,636	69.39%	2,306	1.64%

Senate Class 2 election results

United States Senate election results for Hudson County, New Jersey2
Year	Republican		Democratic		Third party(ies)	
Year	No.	%	No.	%	No.	%
2020	56,917	23.70%	176,658	73.57%	6,538	2.72%
2014	16,707	19.21%	68,165	78.37%	2,109	2.42%
2013	12,830	20.90%	47,683	77.68%	871	1.42%
2008	40,573	23.72%	126,098	73.72%	4,373	2.56%
2002	25,194	24.73%	74,127	72.76%	2,560	2.51%
1996	39,220	25.00%	111,539	71.09%	6,143	3.92%
1990	32,311	32.50%	65,242	65.62%	1,877	1.89%
1984	60,844	30.40%	137,352	68.62%	1,978	0.99%

=== State elections ===
Governor election results

Gubernatorial election results for Hudson County, New Jersey
Year	Republican		Democratic		Third party(ies)	
Year	No.	%	No.	%	No.	%
2025	41,021	24.08%	127,181	74.67%	2,122	1.25%
2021	30,443	25.43%	88,066	73.56%	1,206	1.01%
2017	19,236	17.58%	88,271	80.68%	1,898	1.73%
2013	42,567	43.62%	53,386	54.71%	1,632	1.67%
2009	30,820	26.08%	82,075	69.44%	5,297	4.48%
2005	25,769	22.24%	87,409	75.44%	2,691	2.32%
2001	37,440	30.26%	85,074	68.75%	1,224	0.99%
1997	47,468	35.59%	80,526	60.37%	5,394	4.04%
1993	54,144	39.70%	80,013	58.67%	2,217	1.63%
1989	32,215	24.96%	95,122	73.69%	1,754	1.36%
1985	88,165	65.06%	46,195	34.09%	1,160	0.86%
1981	54,740	34.76%	101,045	64.16%	1,706	1.08%
1977	49,160	34.40%	89,181	62.41%	4,550	3.18%
1973	39,827	23.90%	124,558	74.73%	2,285	1.37%
1969	116,066	56.77%	85,379	41.76%	3,018	1.48%
1965	55,632	25.66%	156,671	72.26%	4,513	2.08%
1961	95,886	40.81%	136,145	57.94%	2,937	1.25%
1957	101,489	40.81%	144,388	58.05%	2,835	1.14%
1953	89,501	34.30%	160,425	61.48%	11,014	4.22%

== Municipalities ==
Interactive map of municipalities in Hudson County

There are 12 municipalities in Hudson County, listed with area in square miles and 2010 Census data for population and housing. North Hudson and West Hudson each comprise municipalities in their distinct areas.

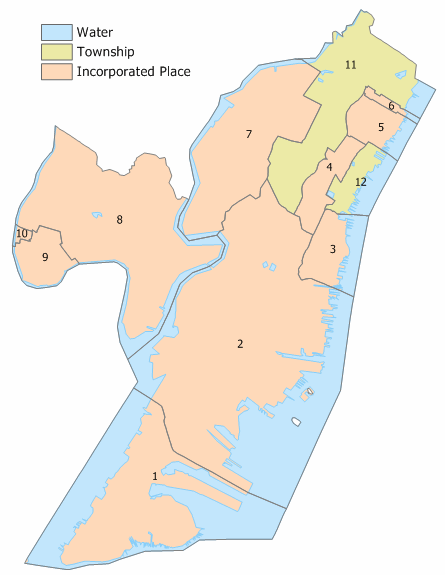
Hudson County municipalities index map

Municipality	Map key	Mun. type	Pop.	Housing units	Total area	Water area	Land area	Pop. density	Housing density	School district
Bayonne	1	city	71,686	27,799	11.08	5.28	5.80	10,858.3	4,789.4	Bayonne
East Newark	10	borough	2,594	794	0.12	0.02	0.10	23,532.1	7,765.8	Harrison (9–12) (S/R); East Newark (K-8)
Guttenberg	6	town	12,017	4,839	0.24	0.05	0.20	57,116.0	24,730.2	North Bergen (9–12) (S/R); Guttenberg (PK-8)
Harrison	9	town	19,450	5,228	1.32	0.12	1.20	11,319.3	4,344.9	Harrison
Hoboken	3	city	60,419	26,855	2.01	0.74	1.28	39,212.0	21,058.7	Hoboken
Jersey City	2	city	292,449	108,720	21.08	6.29	14.79	16,736.6	7,349.1	Jersey City
Kearny	8	town	41,999	14,180	10.19	1.42	8.77	4,636.5	1,616.0	Kearny
North Bergen	11	township	63,361	23,912	5.57	0.44	5.13	11,838.0	4,657.8	North Bergen
Secaucus	7	town	22,181	6,846	6.60	0.78	5.82	2,793.7	1,175.9	Secaucus
Union City	4	city	68,589	24,931	1.28	0.00	1.28	51,810.1	19,436.9	Union City
Weehawken	12	township	17,197	6,213	1.48	0.68	0.80	15,764.6	7,801.9	Weehawken
West New York	5	town	52,912	20,018	1.33	0.32	1.01	49,341.7	19,870.5	West New York
Hudson County		county	724,854	270,335	62.31	16.12	46.19	13,731.4	5,852.5	

== Education ==
=== Tertiary education ===
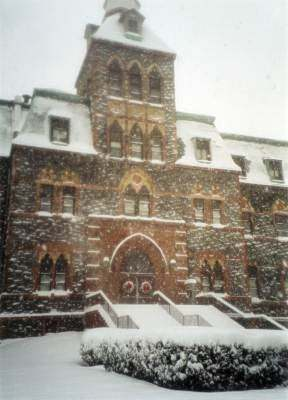
Edwin A. Stevens Building at the Stevens Institute of Technology in Hoboken

The colleges and universities in Hudson County are Hudson County Community College (HCCC), New Jersey City University (NJCU), Saint Peter's University (all in Jersey City) and Stevens Institute of Technology (in Hoboken). Rutgers University also offers classes within the county. The Christ Hospital School of Nursing was established in 1890 and has run a cooperative program with HCCC since 1999. As of 2014, it was set to merge with the Bayonne Medical Center School of Nursing.

=== School districts ===
Each municipality has a public school district. All but two have their own public high schools. East Newark students attend Harrison High School and Guttenberg students attend North Bergen High School. Hudson County Schools of Technology is a public secondary and adult vocational-technical school with locations in Secaucus, Jersey City, Union City and Harrison. There are public and private elementary and secondary schools located throughout Hudson, many of which are members of the Hudson County Interscholastic Athletic Association.

School districts, all classified as K-12 (except as indicated), include:

- Bayonne School District
- East Newark School District (K–8)
- Guttenberg Public School District (K–8)
- Harrison Public Schools
- Hoboken Public Schools
- Hudson County Schools of Technology (9–12)
- Jersey City Public Schools
- Kearny School District
- North Bergen School District
- Secaucus Public Schools
- Union City School District
- Weehawken School District
- West New York School District

== Transportation ==
The confluence of roads and railways of the Northeastern U.S. megalopolis and Northeast Corridor passing through Hudson County make it one of the Northeast's major transportation crossroads and provide access to an extensive network of interstate highways, state freeways and toll roads, and vehicular water crossings. Many long-distance trains and buses pass through the county, though Amtrak and the major national bus companies – Greyhound Lines and Trailways – do not provide service within it. There are many local, intrastate, and Manhattan-bound bus routes, an expanding light rail system, ferries traversing the Hudson, and commuter trains to North Jersey, the Jersey Shore, and Trenton. Much of the rail, surface transit, and ferry system is oriented to commuters traveling to Newark, lower and midtown Manhattan, and the Hudson Waterfront. Public transportation is operated by a variety of public and private corporations, notably NJ Transit, the Port Authority of New York and New Jersey, and NY Waterway, each of which charge customers separately for their service. Hudson is the only county in New Jersey where more residents (127,708) used public transportation than drove (124,772).

=== Hubs ===
Hoboken Terminal, Bergenline Avenue at 32nd Street, 48th Street, and Nungessers in North Hudson, and Journal Square Transportation Center and Exchange Place in Jersey City are major public transportation hubs. The Port Authority Bus Terminal and New York Penn Station in Midtown Manhattan, the World Trade Center in Lower Manhattan, and Newark Penn Station also play important roles within the county's transportation network. Secaucus Junction provides access to eight commuter rail lines.

=== Rail ===
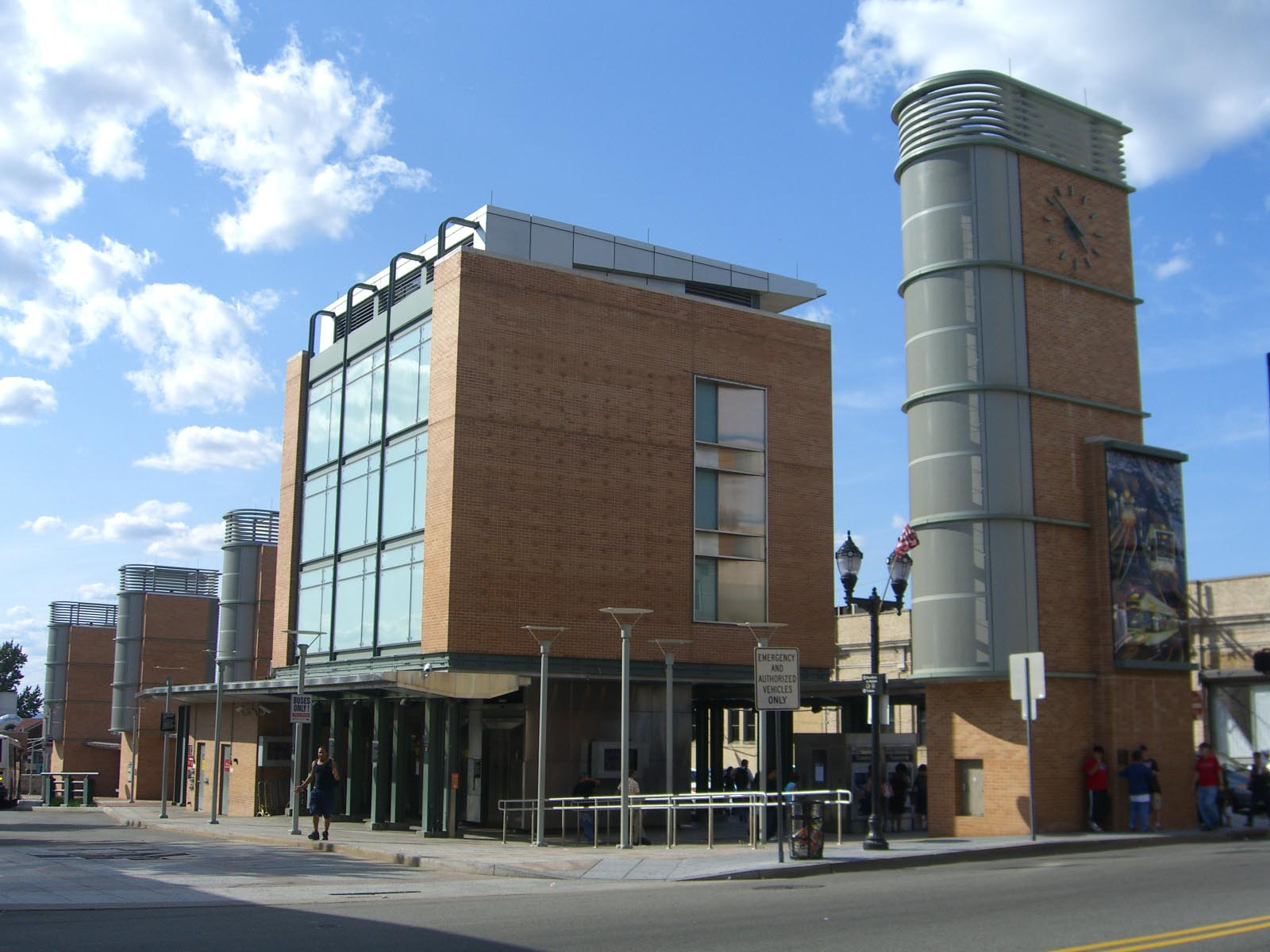
Bergenline Station at 49th Street between Bergenline Avenue and Kennedy Boulevard at the border of Union City, West New York and North Bergen

- Hudson-Bergen Light Rail serves Bayonne, Jersey City, Hoboken, and North Hudson at the Weehawken waterfront, Bergenline Avenue and Tonnelle Avenue.
- NJ Transit Hoboken Division: Main Line (to Suffern, and in partnership with MTA/Metro-North, express service to Port Jervis), Bergen County Line, and jointly with MTA/Metro-North, Pascack Valley Line, all via Secaucus Junction; Montclair-Boonton Line and Morris and Essex Lines; North Jersey Coast Line (limited service as Waterfront Connection); Raritan Valley Line (limited service), and Meadowlands Rail Line

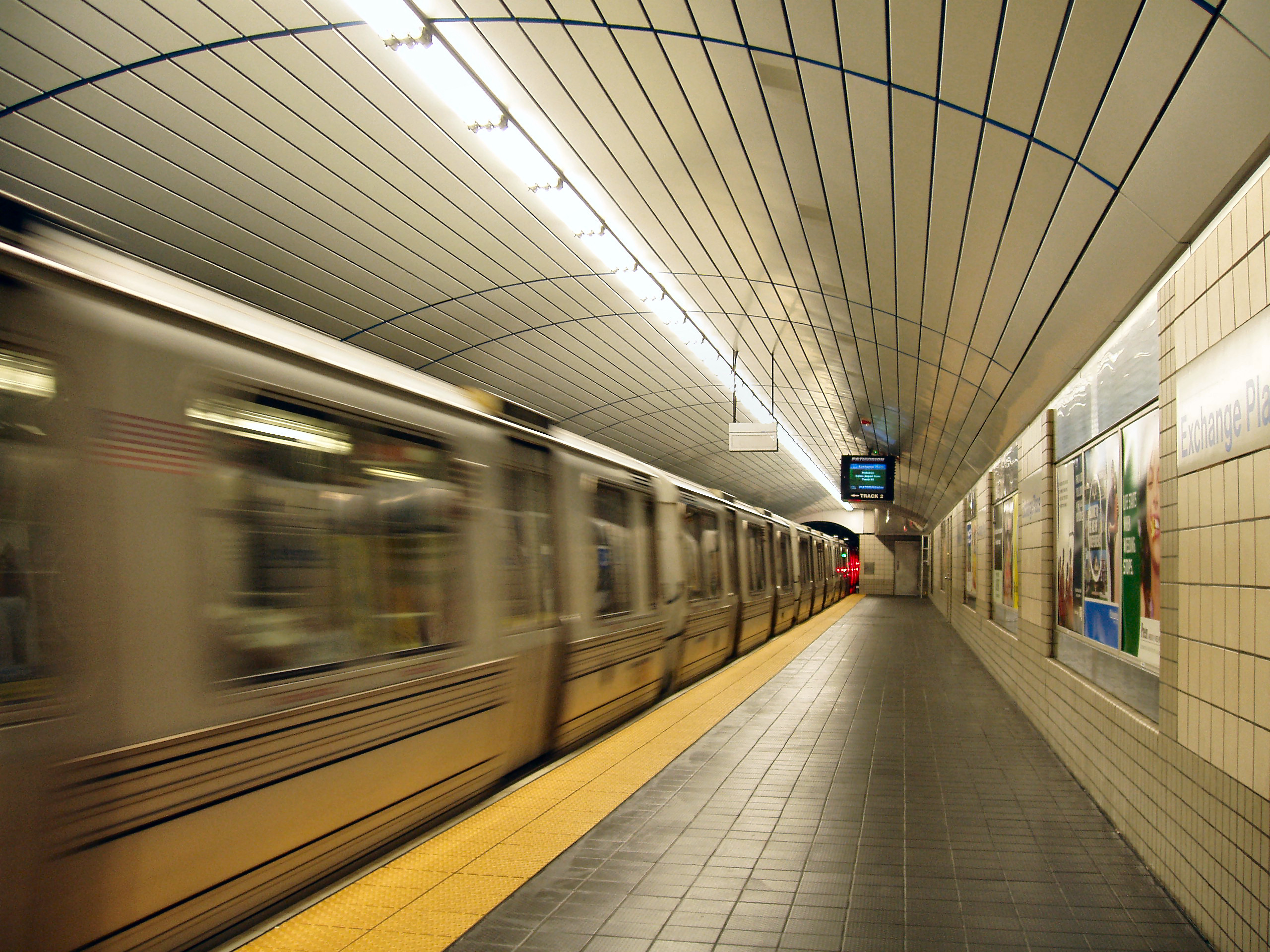
Exchange Place PATH station, in the Paulus Hook neighborhood of Jersey City

- NJ Transit Newark Division: Northeast Corridor Line and North Jersey Coast Line can be reached via Secaucus Junction or PATH
- PATH is a 24-hour subway mass transit system serving Newark Penn Station, Harrison, Journal Square, Downtown Jersey City, Hoboken Terminal, midtown Manhattan (33rd) (along 6th Ave to Herald Square/New York Penn Station), and World Trade Center.

=== Bus ===
NJ Transit bus routes 120 -129 provide service within Hudson and to Manhattan. NJ Transit bus routes 1-89 provide service within the county and to points in North Jersey. Additionally, private bus companies, some of which operate dollar vans (mini-buses or carritos) augment the state agency's surface transport.

=== Water ===
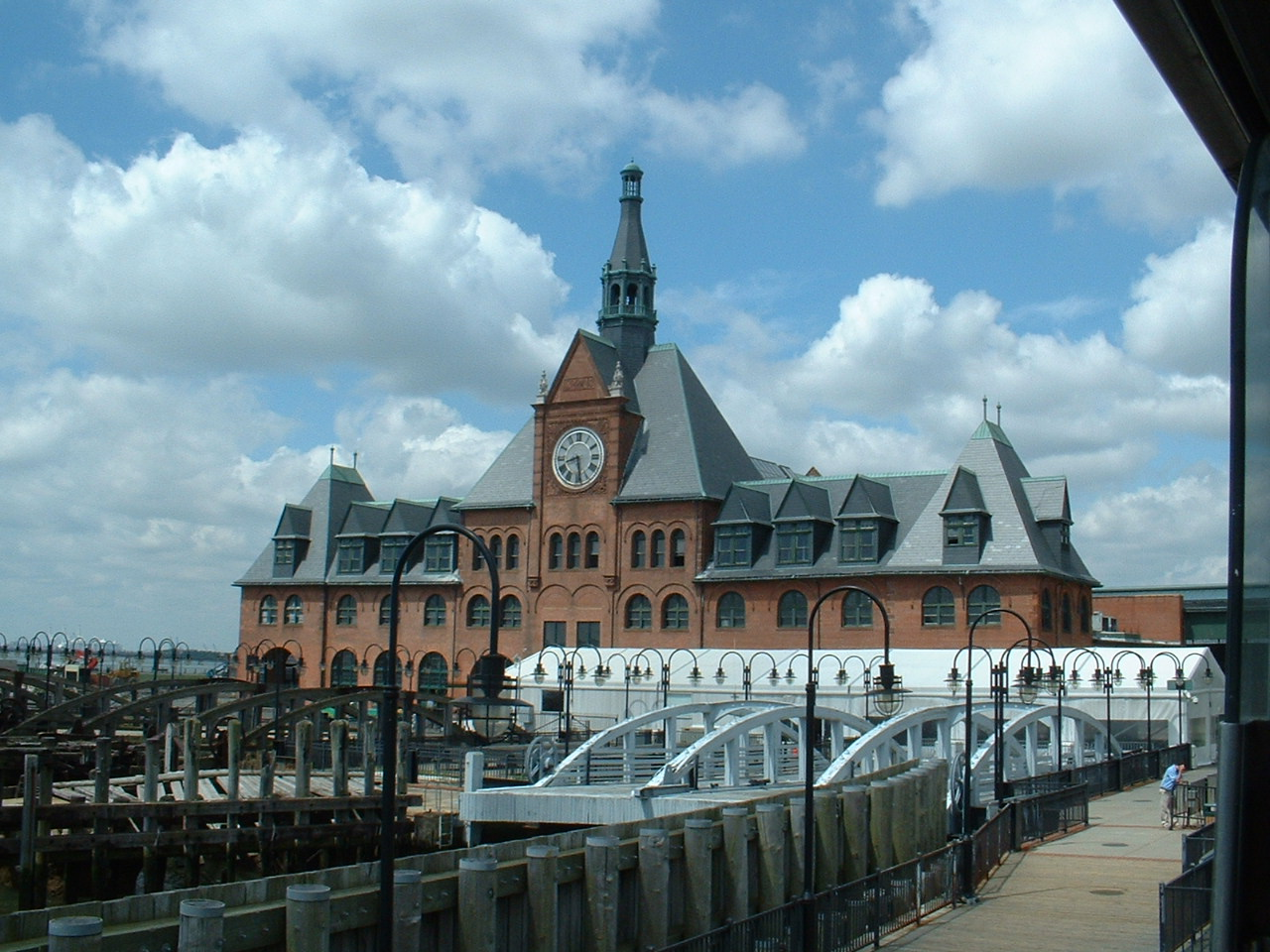
CRRNJ Terminal in Liberty State Park, with ferry slips in foreground

Located at the heart of the Port of New York and New Jersey, Hudson County has since the 1980s seen the restoration of its once extensive ferry system.

- NY Waterway operates ferry service from Weehawken Port Imperial, Hoboken Terminal, and Paulus Hook Ferry Terminal as well as other ferry slips along the Hudson River Waterfront Walkway to West Midtown Ferry Terminal, Battery Park City Ferry Terminal and Pier 11/Wall Street in Manhattan, and to the Raritan Bayshore
- Liberty Water Taxi provides service on one route between Liberty State Park, Paulus Hook, and Battery Park City.
- Statue City Cruises provides service to Ellis Island and Liberty Island
- Cape Liberty Cruise Port in Bayonne is one of three passenger terminals in the port.
- Port Jersey is one of four container shipping terminals in the port.

=== Roads and highways ===
As of 2010, the county had a total of 616.81 mi (992.66 km) of roadways, of which 515.38 mi (829.42 km) are maintained by the local municipality, 47.31 mi (76.14 km) by Hudson County, 33.23 mi (53.48 km) by the New Jersey Department of Transportation, 17.90 mi (28.81 km) by the New Jersey Turnpike Authority and 3.37 mi (5.42 km) by the Port Authority of New York and New Jersey.

Major highways include New Jersey Routes 3, 7, 139, 185, 440, 495, Interstates 78, 95, and 280, and U.S. Routes 1/9 and 1/9 Truck, as well as the New Jersey Turnpike and the Pulaski Skyway. Automobile access to New York City is available through the Lincoln Tunnel (via Weehawken to Midtown Manhattan) and the Holland Tunnel (via Jersey City to Lower Manhattan), and over the Bayonne Bridge to Staten Island. County Route 501 runs the length of Hudson as Kennedy Boulevard.

In 2013, two main thoroughfares in Hudson County, Kennedy Boulevard and U.S. Route 1/9, were included among the Tri-State Transportation Campaign's list of the top ten most dangerous roads for pedestrians in New Jersey, New York and Connecticut. Kennedy Boulevard was ranked #6 for the six pedestrian fatalities that occurred on it from 2009 to 2011, while Route 1/9 was tied for the #10 place on the list for the five pedestrian deaths during the same period. Route 1/9 is monitored by state police, while Kennedy Boulevard is patrolled by the Hudson County Sheriff's Office and the respective municipalities through which that road runs. In total, 37 pedestrians – 12 in 2009, 14 in 2010 and 11 in 2011 – were killed on Hudson County roads. According to state police statistics there were nine pedestrian fatalities in the county in 2012, which was not included in the study. From 2010 through 2012, 25 people were killed each year in Hudson County motor vehicle accidents.

=== Air ===
Most airports which serve Hudson County are operated by the Port Authority of New York and New Jersey.

- Newark Liberty International Airport (EWR), 12.8 mi (20.6 km) away in Newark, is the closest airport with scheduled passenger service.
- LaGuardia Airport (LGA) is 12.8 mi (20.6 km) away in Flushing, Queens.
- John F. Kennedy Airport (JFK) is 19 mi (31 km) away on Jamaica Bay in Queens.
- Teterboro Airport, in the Hackensack Meadowlands, serves private and corporate planes.
- Essex County Airport, in Fairfield, is a general aviation airport serving the region.

== Parks and points of interest ==
The Hudson County Park System includes Hudson County Park, Mercer Park, Lincoln Park, Washington Park, Columbus Park, and North Hudson Park, West Hudson Park and the newest, Laurel Hill. Some of the city's municipal parks and plazas, were developed as "city squares" during the 19th century, such as Hamilton Park, Church Square Park and Ellsworth (locally known as Pigeon) Park.

The German-American Volksfest has taken place annually since 1874 at Schuetzen Park This private park and the many nearby cemeteries-Flower Hill Cemetery, Grove Church Cemetery, Hoboken Cemetery, Macphelah Cemetery and Weehawken Cemetery that characterize the western slope create the "green lung" of North Hudson County.

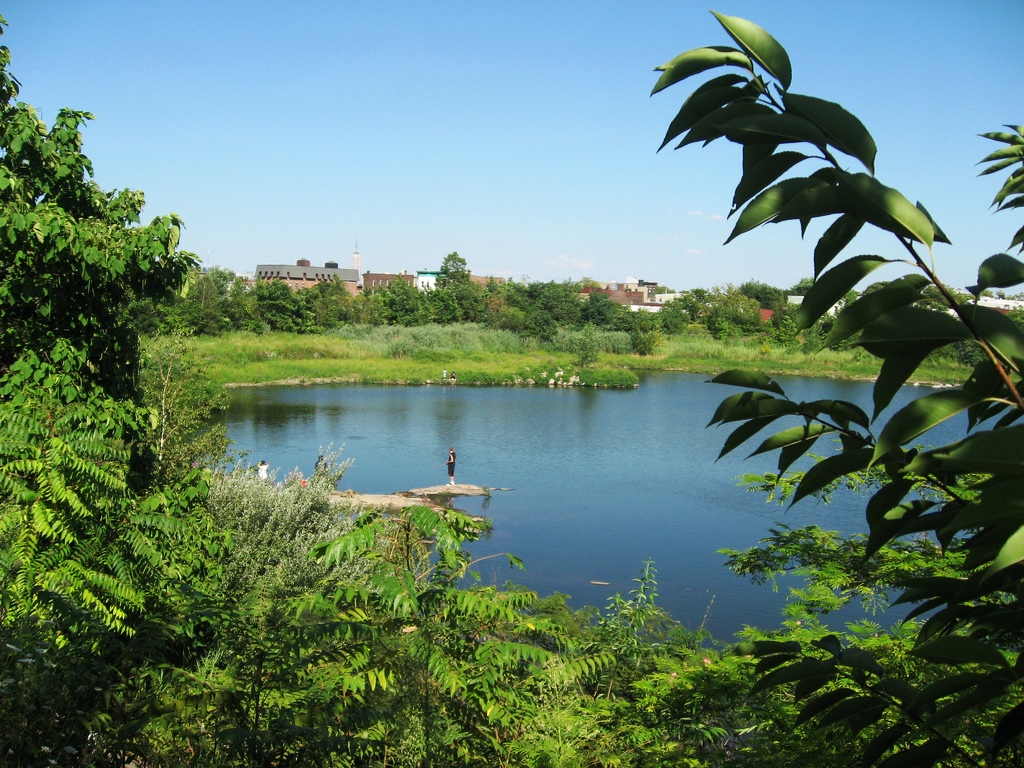
Jersey City Reservoir No. 3

Jersey City Reservoir No. 3 and Pershing Field constitute one of the largest "green spaces" in the county. The reservoir, no longer in use, is site of a passive recreation area/nature preserve. Hackensack Number Two, the other remaining reservoir in Weehawken Heights, is not accessible to the public. Extensive athletic fields opened in 2009 in Weehawken and Union City, the latter on the site of the former Roosevelt Stadium.

Promenades are being developed along the rivers. The Hudson River Waterfront Walkway and Hackensack RiverWalk. Sections of the Secaucus Greenway are in place and eventually will connect different districts of the town including the North End, site Schmidts Woods (which contains an original hard wood forest) and Mill Creek Point Park, and Harmon Meadow Plaza. Kearny Riverbank Park runs along the Passaic River. The future of the Harsimus Stem Embankment is uncertain, though many community groups hope the landmark will be opened to the public as elevated greenway, possibly as part of East Coast Greenway.

Liberty State Park, the county's largest, is sited on land that had once been part of a vast oyster bed, was filled in for industrial, rail, and maritime uses, and was reclaimed in the 1970s. Ellis Island and Liberty Island, a national protected area and home to the Statue of Liberty National Monument, lie entirely within Hudson's waters across from Liberty State Park, from which ferry service is available.

The New Jersey Meadowlands Commission has designated several areas within its jurisdiction as wetlands preservation zones including the Riverbend Wetlands Preserve, Eastern Brackish Marsh, and Kearny Marsh, an extension of De Korte Park, home of the Meadowlands Environment Center.

Hudson County is home to Skyway Golf Course, the 8th ranked 9 hole golf course in the country (Golf Advisor 2019), Bayonne Golf Club and Liberty National Golf Club, ball located on Upper New York Bay.

- See Historic districts in Hudson County, New Jersey
- See Odonyms in Hudson County, New Jersey
- See List of cemeteries in Hudson County, New Jersey
- See List of the oldest buildings in New Jersey
- See List of bridges, tunnels, and cuts in Hudson County, New Jersey

== Museums, galleries, exhibitions ==
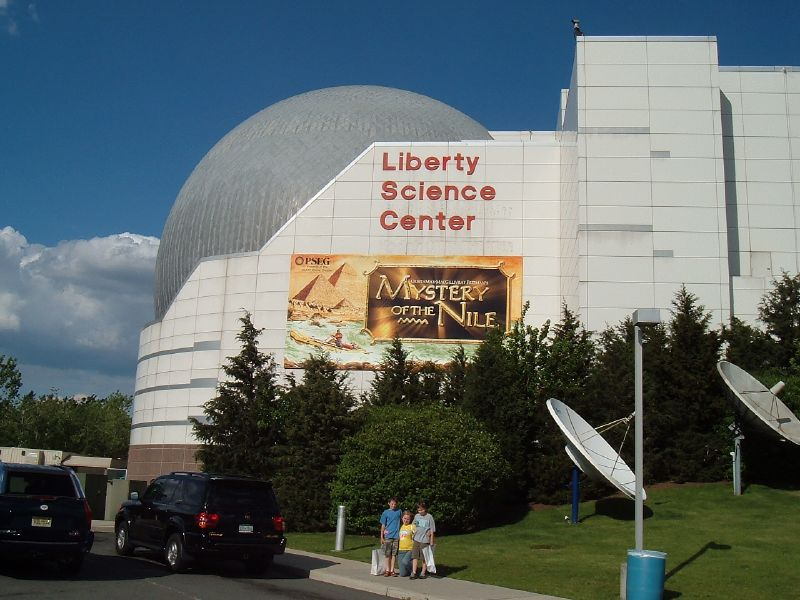
Liberty Science Center in Liberty State Park, Jersey City

There are several museums and other exhibitions spaces throughout the county, some of which maintain permanent collections. Other are focused on local culture, history, or the environment. There are events throughout the year where architecture, local artists or ethnic culture are highlighted. There are also private galleries. The venues include:

- Afro-American Historical and Cultural Society Museum
- Bayonne Community Museum
- Bayonne Firefighter's Museum
- Central Railroad of New Jersey Terminal
- Cultural Thread/El Hilo, history, diversity and craft of embroidery
- Danforth Avenue Station, excavated objects
- Dixon Mills, site of the former Joseph Dixon Crucible Company
- Drawing Rooms, a contemporary art center and gallery in a former convent in downtown Jersey City
- Ellis Island Immigration Museum
- Five Corners Branch Library Gallery, specializing in music and fine arts
- Hoboken Artists Studio Tour
- Hoboken Fire Department Museum
- Hoboken Historical Museum, history and local contemporary artists
- Hoboken House Tour, private and public buildings shown annually in October
- Hoboken Public Library, local history and local artists
- Hudson County Courthouse, permanent murals depicting early history and contemporary work
- Hudson River Waterfront Walkway, displays, plaques, panels of history of environment and development
- Kearny Museum
- Hudson County YAM
- Jersey City Artists Studio Tour
- Jersey City Museum
- Liberty Science Center, science education, environment, health, invention
- Liberty State Park, interpretive center, nature and urban environment
- Museum of Russian Art
- New Jersey Room of Jersey City Public Library Main Branch, public archives including historical documents and photos
- Mana Contemporary
- Martin Luther King Station, memorial to civil rights leader and movement
- Meadowlands Exposition Center, trade shows and cultural fairs
- Monroe Center
- New Jersey City University
  - Lemmerman Gallery
  - Visual Arts Gallery
  - Sculpture Garden
- Saints Peter's College Art Gallery
- Statue of Liberty National Monument
- William V. Musto Cultural Center

== See also ==
- Bergen, New Netherland
- Bergen
- Bergen Point
- Bergen Square
- Bergen Township
- Constable Hook
- New Jersey Meadowlands Commission
- Hackensack RiverWalk
- Hudson River Waterfront Walkway
- The Hudson Reporter
- Gateway Region
- Gold Coast
- New Barbadoes Neck
- New Jersey Meadowlands
- New Jersey Palisades
- North Hudson
- North Jersey
- Pavonia
- Snake Hill
- West Hudson
- List of neighborhoods in Hudson Waterfront municipalities
- List of New Jersey Transit bus routes (100-199)
- Historic townships of Hudson County, New Jersey
- People from Hudson County, New Jersey
- Neighborhoods in Hudson County, New Jersey
