= Anne Ceridwen Rees =

Welsh physician

Ann Ceridwen Rees
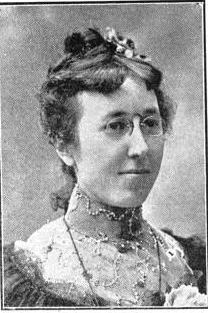
- 1905 Portrait of Ann Ceridwen Rees
- Born: July 9, 1874; Carmarthenshire, Wales
- Died: October 19, 1905 (aged 31); New Jersey, United States
- Scientific career
- Fields: Family medicine

Anne Ceridwen Rees (July 9, 1874 – October 19, 1905) was a Welsh-American physician who practiced in New Jersey.

== Early life ==
Rees was born in Pentregwenlais, Carmarthenshire in Wales on July 9, 1874. Her parents were Edwin and Mary E. Rees; her mother was also known in literary circles as Dyffrynferch. She attended Gwynfryn Academy, where she studied with Watcyn Wyn. In 1892, she moved to America, to pursue medical training at the Woman's Medical College at the New York Infirmary. She earned her doctor of medicine degree in 1898.

== Career ==
Rees lived with her aunt and uncle, and built a medical practice in Union Hill, New Jersey, during her short career. Her work was cited as a reason for her early death in obituaries: "Her constitution, undermined by the years of hard work, proved unequal to the demands made upon it."

== Personal life and death ==
Rees died from pneumonia on October 19, 1905, at the age of 31. Her funeral service was conducted in both Welsh and English, in New Jersey. A poem in Welsh titled "Ann", in memory of Anne Ceridwen Rees, was published in 1906.
