= List of Bergen, New Netherland placename etymologies =

Bergen was a part of the 17th-century Dutch colony of New Netherland, in what is now northeastern New Jersey. Placenames in most cases had their roots in Algonquian Lenape and Dutch.

At the time of European settlement, the area was largely the territory of the Acquackanonk Raritan, Tappan, and Hackensack Native American tribes. The Munsee lived in the colony's northwestern reaches, the Highlands, while the Wappinger lived to the northeast in the Hudson Valley. The definition of these groups as they are known today is often from the perception of the colonizing Dutch, who tended to call the existing people by the name of a location within their territory, thus creating an exonym. Both the Lenape and Dutch often named a place based on the geography or geology of the natural environment and described a shape, location, feature, quality, or phenomenon.

The Lenape were without a written language. The Swannekins, or Salt Water People (as the Europeans were called), used the Latin alphabet to write down the words they heard from the Wilden (as the Lenape were called). These approximations were no doubt greatly influenced by Dutch, which was the lingua franca of the multilingual province. Some names still exist in their altered form, their current spelling (and presumably pronunciation) having evolved over the last four centuries into American English.

In some cases it cannot be confirmed, or there is contention, as to whether the roots are in the Dutch or the Lenape language, as sources do not always concur. In others, the meaning of the Lenape can have several interpretations. Locative suffixes vary depending on the dialect (usually Munsee or Unami) of the Lenape that prevailed. Jersey Dutch was spoken in the region until the 20th century.

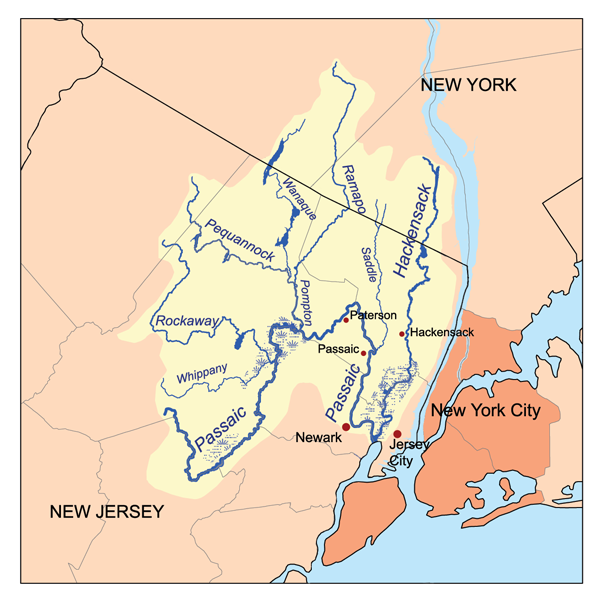
Many rivers in the region bear names based in their Lenape appellation.

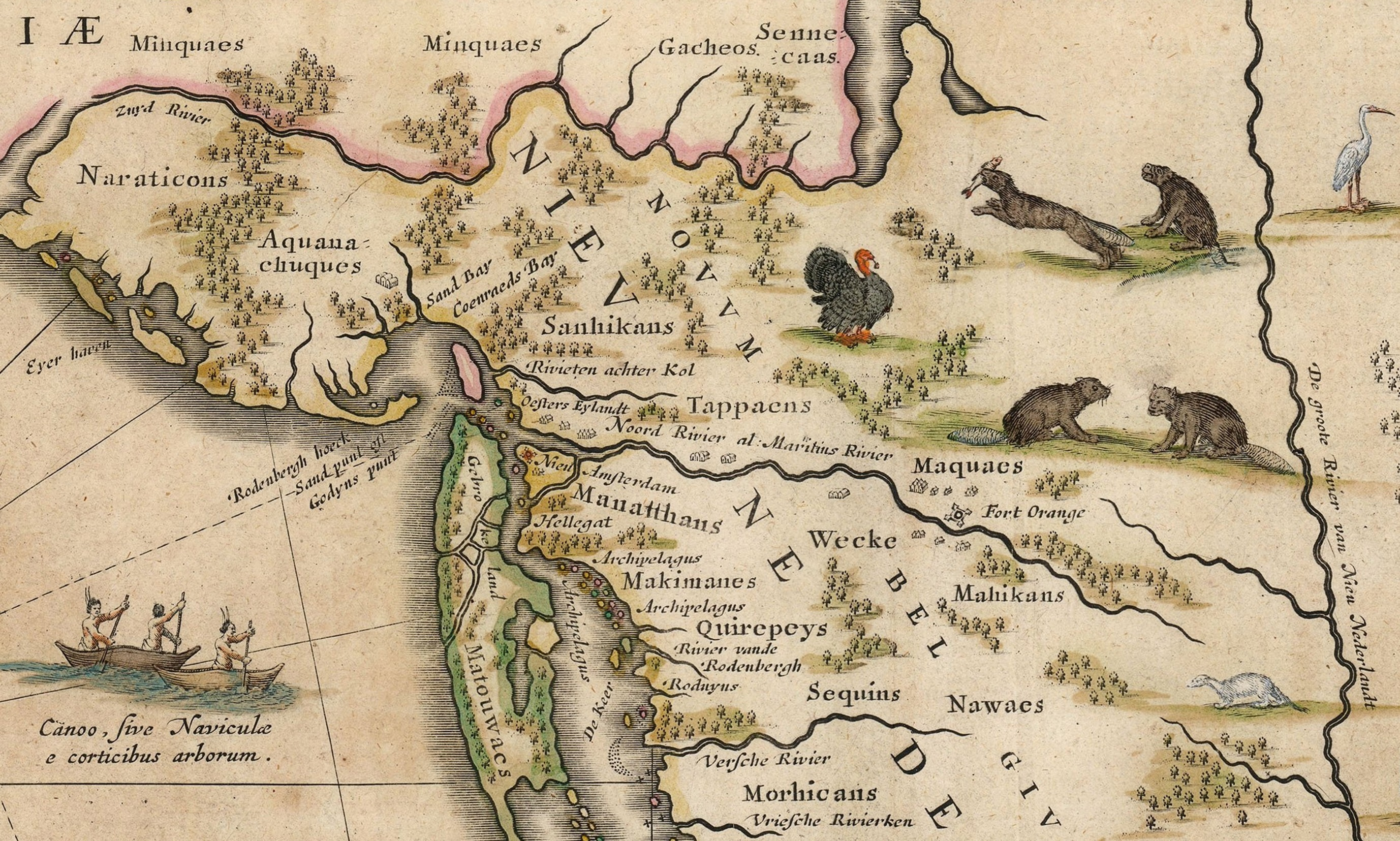
Map c.1634, Early names for Bergen were Oesters Eylandt (Oyster Island) and Achter Kol. The three structures likely represented Communipaw, Paulus Hook, and Harsimus.

== Acquackanonk ==
Name of an Unami group who lived along and between the banks of the Passaic River Neck. Meaning a place in a rapid stream where fishing is done with a net, alternatively, at the lamprey stream, from contemporary axkwaakahnung. Spellings include Achquakanonk, Acquackanonk, Auchaquackanock, Ackquekenon. Acquackanonk Township was one of the state's first townships, established in 1683. Pieces of it were taken over the years to create the towns of Fairfield, Paterson, Little Falls, Passaic, and Montclair. It ceased to exist with the creation of Clifton in 1917. A bridge in the township was burned as General George Washington's army retreated from Fort Lee in 1776, during the American Revolution.

== Achter Kol ==
Described the area around Newark Bay and the rivers that flowed into it. Called Meghgectecock by the Lenape. Achter, meaning behind, and kol, meaning neck, can be translated as the back (of the) peninsula, in this case Bergen Neck. Variations include Achter Col, Achter Kull, Archer Col, Achter Kull. The name Achter Kol is largely extinct, though it is likely to have evolved into Arthur Kill, the name of a different waterway in the area.

== Arresick ==
A former tidal island, site of first ferry landing for the patroonship Pavonia.

Arresick can be translated as burial ground. It can also be spelled as Arressechhonk.

The island has been absorbed by landfill and is now part of the Paulus Hook neighborhood of Jersey City.

== Arthur Kill ==
A tidal strait separating Staten Island from mainland New Jersey. From kille, meaning water channel such as riverbed, rivulet, or stream. Likely to have evolved from Achter Col, adapted by English-language speakers that immigrated to the region from the Elizabethtown Tract and Perth Amboy.

== Bedloe's Island ==
Under Dutch sovereignty the island became the property of Isaack Bedloo, a merchant and "select burgher" of New Amsterdam, and one of 94 signers of the "Remonstrance of the People of New Netherlands to the Director-General and Council". It has been the home of the Statue of Liberty since 1886, and was renamed to Liberty Island in 1956.

== Bergen ==
There are various opinions as to the naming of Bergen. Some say that it so called for Bergen op Zoom in the Netherlands, or for the city of Bergen in Norway. Others believe it comes from the word bergen, which in the Germanic languages of northern Europe means hills, and could have been used to describe a distinct geological feature of the region, The Palisades. Yet another interpretation is that it comes from the Dutch word bergen, meaning to save or to recover, or place of safety, inspired by the settlers returning after they had fled attacks by the native population in the Peach War.

The name Bergen is widely used in northeastern New Jersey, not only for the Bergen County itself but also in Bergen Point, Bergen Hill, Bergen Arches, Bergenline Avenue, Bergenfield, among many others.

== Caven Point ==
The Caven Point settlement at Minkakwa on the west shore of the Upper New York Bay lied between the settlements of Pamrapo and Communipaw, and was part of Pavonia. The name Caven is an anglicisation of the Dutch word Kewan, which in turn was a "Batavianized" derivative of an Algonquian word meaning peninsula. The area is now a part of Liberty State Park in Jersey City, after having served as a large railyard, train station, and ferry terminal for many years.

== Communipaw ==
Site of the summer encampment and council fire of the Hackensack tribe, its complete meaning has been lost. Spellings include Gamoenapa, Gemonepan, Gemoenepaen, Gamenepaw, Comounepaw, Comounepan, Communipau, Goneuipan.

Some suggest it is derived from the Lenape words gamunk, meaning on the other side of the river, and pe-auke, meaning water-land or big landing-place. Others have suggested that it might come from the "Community of Pauw", which likely is more a coincidence than a fact.

The Communipaw neighborhood of Jersey City takes its name from the settlement. The Communipaw Terminal is a former railroad station in Liberty State Park, through which countless immigrants entered the United States after traveling through Ellis Island.

== Constable Hook ==
A land grant to Jacob Jacobsen Roy who was a chief gunner or constable in Fort Amsterdam in New Amsterdam in 1646, by the Dutch West India Company, under the leadership of Director-General William Kieft. Konstapel's Hoeck in Dutch, takes its name from Roy's title. A hoek or hoeck in Dutch meaning a spit of land or small peninsula. Though not used, could be translated to English as Gunner's Point.

== Cromakill ==
Cromakill Creek, likely from kromme kille meaning crooked creek, border between Secaucus and North Bergen. Similar to evolution of Gramercy, which is a corruption of the krom mesje, or little crooked knife, the name of a small brook that flowed along what is now 21st Street in Manhattan.

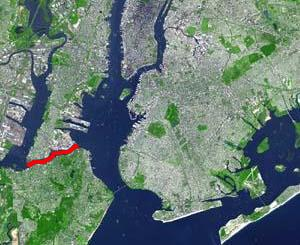
Kill Van Kull connects Newark Bay with Upper New York Bay

== Cresskill ==
From the watercress that grew in its streams, or kills in the historical Dutch.

The borough of Cresskill exists today in modern Bergen County.

== Deep Voll ==
Diepte Voll, which literally translates to Deep Fall, to describe the brook's numerous waterfalls and steep slopes. Known as Muksukemuk to the Lenape.

The Deep Voll Brook is a tributary of the Goffle Brook in the Passaic River watershed.

== Dwars Kill ==
Alternatively Dwarskill or Dwarskill Creek, a tributary of the Oradell Reservoir meaning cross creek.

== Dunkerhook ==
Small section of suburban Paramus reputed to be the former site of a "slave community." According to local histories and an historic marker at the site, Dunkerhook was once home to a population of African Americans, many or all of whom were slaves, as well as a "slave school" and "slave church." However, primary historic documentation establishes that Dunkerhook was populated not by slaves, but rather primarily by free African Americans.

== English Neighborhood ==
The former Ridgefield Township in southeastern Bergen County was likely so called the English Township because of the settlers who came to reside there who were not New Netherlander, namely many English language speakers from the West Indies and New England.

== Hackensack ==
The meadowlands, river and city, the Lenape group and their territory, take their name from site of semi-permanent encampment on the neck between the river and Overpeck Creek, near the Teaneck Ridge. Variously translated as place of stony ground or place of sharp ground. Spellings include Ahkingeesahkuy, Achsinnigeu-haki, Achinigeu-hach, Ack-kinkas-hacky, Achkinhenhcky, Ackingsah-sack, Ackinckeshacky, Hackinsack.

Alternatively, suggested as the place where two rivers come together on low ground or stream which discharges itself into another on the level ground, which would speak to the confluence of the Hackensack and Overpeck Creek or Passaic River.

== Harsimus ==
Meaning is not clear, possibly Crow's Marsh. Site of a seasonal Hackensack encampment and one of the first "bouweries" built by Dutch settlers at Pavonia. Spellings include: Aharsimus, Ahasimus,Hasymes, Haassemus, Hahassemes, Hasimus, Horseemes, Hasseme, Horsimus Contemporary: ahas meaning crow

== Haverstraw ==
One of the first locales to appear on maps of North America, listed as Haverstroo, which means oat straw.

== Hoboken ==
Tobacco pipe, from hoopookum or hupoken Most likely to refer to the soapstone collected there to carve tobacco pipes, in a phrase that became Hopoghan Hackingh or place of stone for the tobacco pipe. Contemporary: Hopoakan meaning pipe for smoking.

Alternatively from Hoebuck, old Dutch for high bluff and likely referring to Castle Point Variations used during the colonial era included Hobock, Hobocan, Hoboocken, and Hobuck,. Although the spelling Hoboken was used by the English as early as 1668, it doesn't appear that until Col. John Steven purchased the land on which the city is situated that it became common.

Some would believe the city to be named after European town of the same name. The Flemish Hoboken, annexed in 1983 to Antwerp, Belgium, is derived from Middle Dutch Hooghe Buechen or Hoge Beuken, meaning High Beeches or Tall Beeches. Established in 1135, the New Netherlanders were likely aware of its existence (and may have pronounced the Lenape to conform a more familiar sound), but it is doubtful that the city on the Hudson is named for it.

== Houvenkopf ==
The mountain's name is from the Dutch Hooge Kop, meaning High Head.

== Kill van Kull ==
Separating Bayonne and Staten Island. From the Middle Dutch word kille, meaning riverbed or water channel. Likely evolved from Achter Col, as in kille van kol, or channel from the neck, its spellings including Kill von Cull, Kille van Cole, Kill van Koll.

== Kinderkamack ==
This distinctly Dutch-sounding name which describes the area along middle reaches of Hackensack River, is said to come from the Lenape and mean place of ceremonial dance and worship.

== Losen Slote ==
A tributary of the Hackensack River, from losen and sloot, or a dumping trench, essentially an open sewer.

== Mahwah ==
Mawewi meaning meeting place or place where paths meet or assembly Contemporary: mawemin.

== Manhattan ==
From Manna-hata, as written in the 1609 logbook of Robert Juet, an officer on Henry Hudson's yacht Halve Maen (Half Moon). A 1610 map depicts the name Manahata twice, on both the west and east sides of the Mauritius River (later named the Hudson River). The word "Manhattan" has been translated as the island of many hills . The Encyclopedia of New York City offers other derivations, including from the Munsee dialect of Lenape: manahachtanienk ("place of general inebriation"), manahatouh ("place where timber is procured for bows and arrows"), or menatay ("island").

== Meghgectecock ==
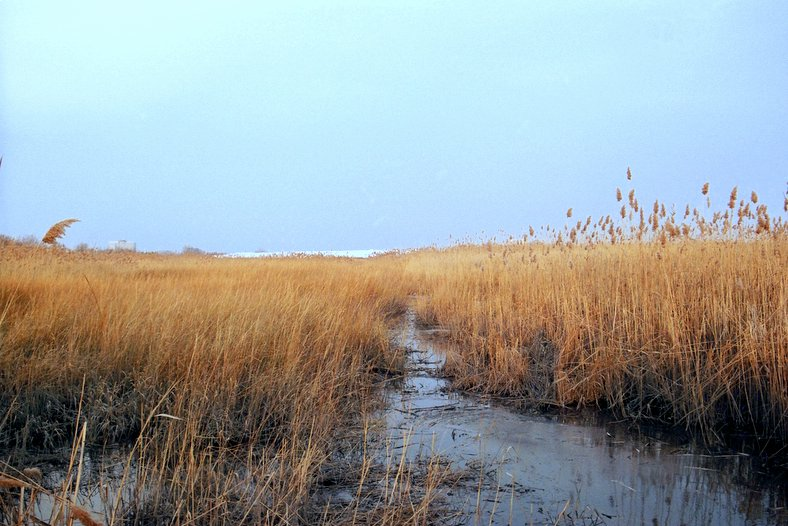

This is perhaps an approximation of masgichteu-cunk meaning where May-apples grow, from a moist-woodland perennial that bears edible yellow berries and used to describe the lobe of land between and the confluence of the Hackensack and Passaic Rivers at Newark Bay. It was part of Achter Col for the New Netherlanders and New Barbadoes Neck to the British. Contemporary: masgichteu meaning may apple.

== Minkakwa ==
On Bergen Neck between Pamrapo and Communipaw at Caven Point,. first settled by New Netherlanders in 1647. Spellings include Minelque and Minkacque meaning a place of good crossing probably because it was the most convenient pass between the two bays on either side of the neck, (or could mean place where the coves meet; in this case where they are closest to each other and, hence advantageous for portage.)

== Moonachie ==
Ground hog, badger, or place of dug up earth.

Contemporary:monachgeu for groundhog, and munhacke for badger and munhageen meaning to dig a hole.

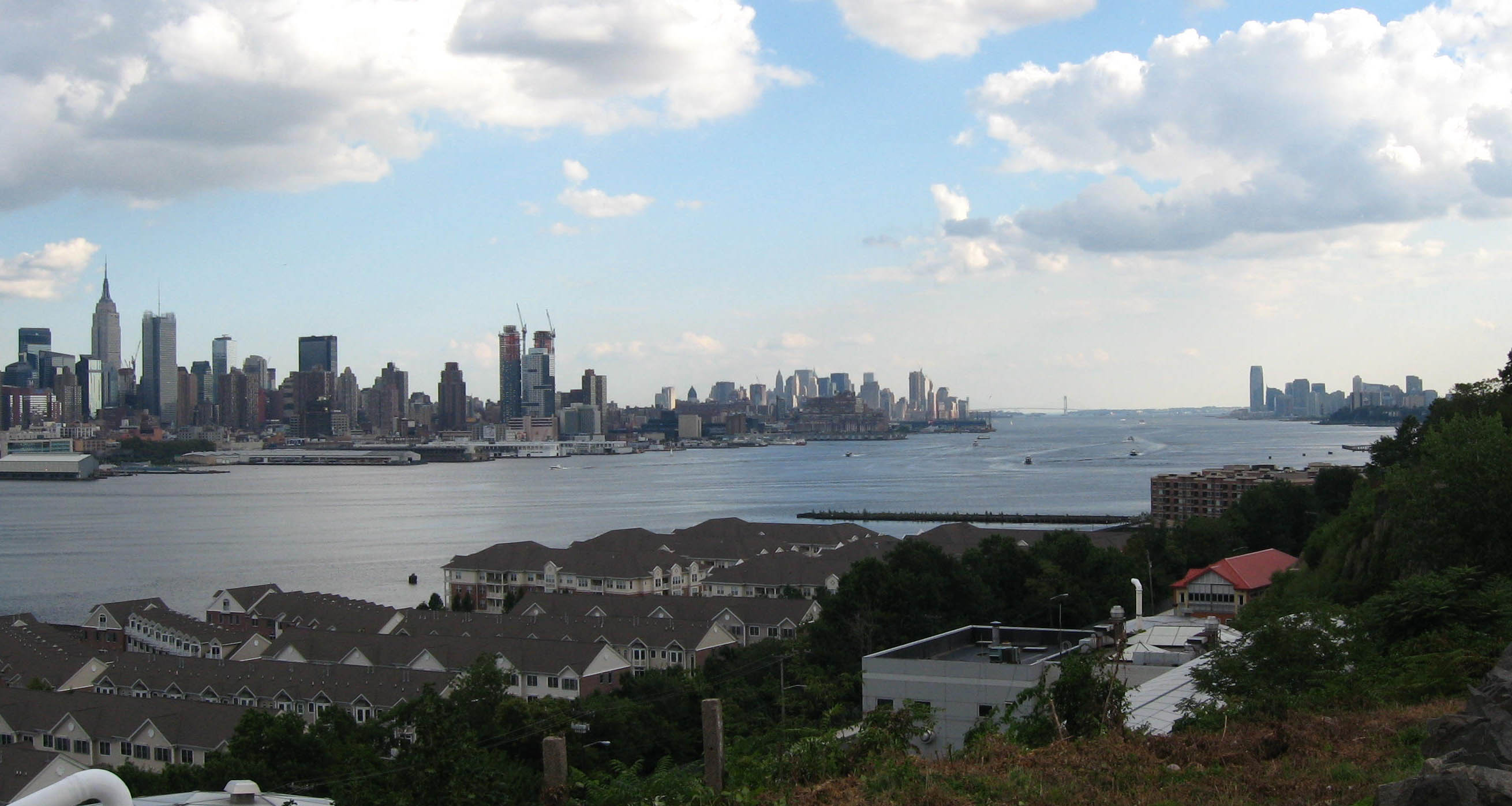
North River is still used in the maritime to describe the lower Hudson

== North River (Noort Rivier) ==
Called Muhheakantuck or the river that flowed two ways in Unami. The Noort Rivier was one of the three main rivers in New Netherland, the others being the Versche Rivier or Fresh River (likely because of its sweet water) and the Zuid Rivier or South River. In maritime usage, it still defines that part of the Hudson between Hudson County and Manhattan. Another story of its origin has it that the rivers connected to New York Harbor are named the "North" River and "East" River based on what direction of travel they permit.

== Outwater ==
Possibly uiterwaarden meaning a flood plain, of which there were many, this one at the foot of Paterson Plank Road. More likely from a landowner in the area.

== Overpeck ==
Oever meaning a sloping bank and perk meaning border or boundary, hence at the water's edge, actually a riparian zone. Used in English as early as 1665. By the Lenape called Tantaqua, it was the site of semi-permanent village of the Hackensack.

== Pequannock ==
From Paquettahhnuake meaning cleared land ready or being readied for cultivation. Packanack is also contemporary variation of this place and the people Pacquanacs.

== Pamrapo ==
On Bergen Neck, between Constable Hook and Communipaw. Spellings include Pimbrepow, Pembrepock, Pemmerepoch, Pimlipo, Pemrepau, Pemrapaugh, and Pamrapough.

== Paramus ==
From Parampseapus or Peremessing meaning, perhaps, where there is worthwhile (or fertile) land or place of wild turkeys. Seapus or sipus is said to mean water, so the name may mean turkey river. Saddle River was also called Peramseapus. Spellings include Pyramus.

== Pascack ==
wet grass or place where grass is wet.

== Passaic ==
The county, river and city are taken from pahsayèk, pahsaayeek and pasayak, meaning valley or water that flows through the valley. Spellings include: Pawsaick, Pissawack. Contemporary: Pachsa'jeek.

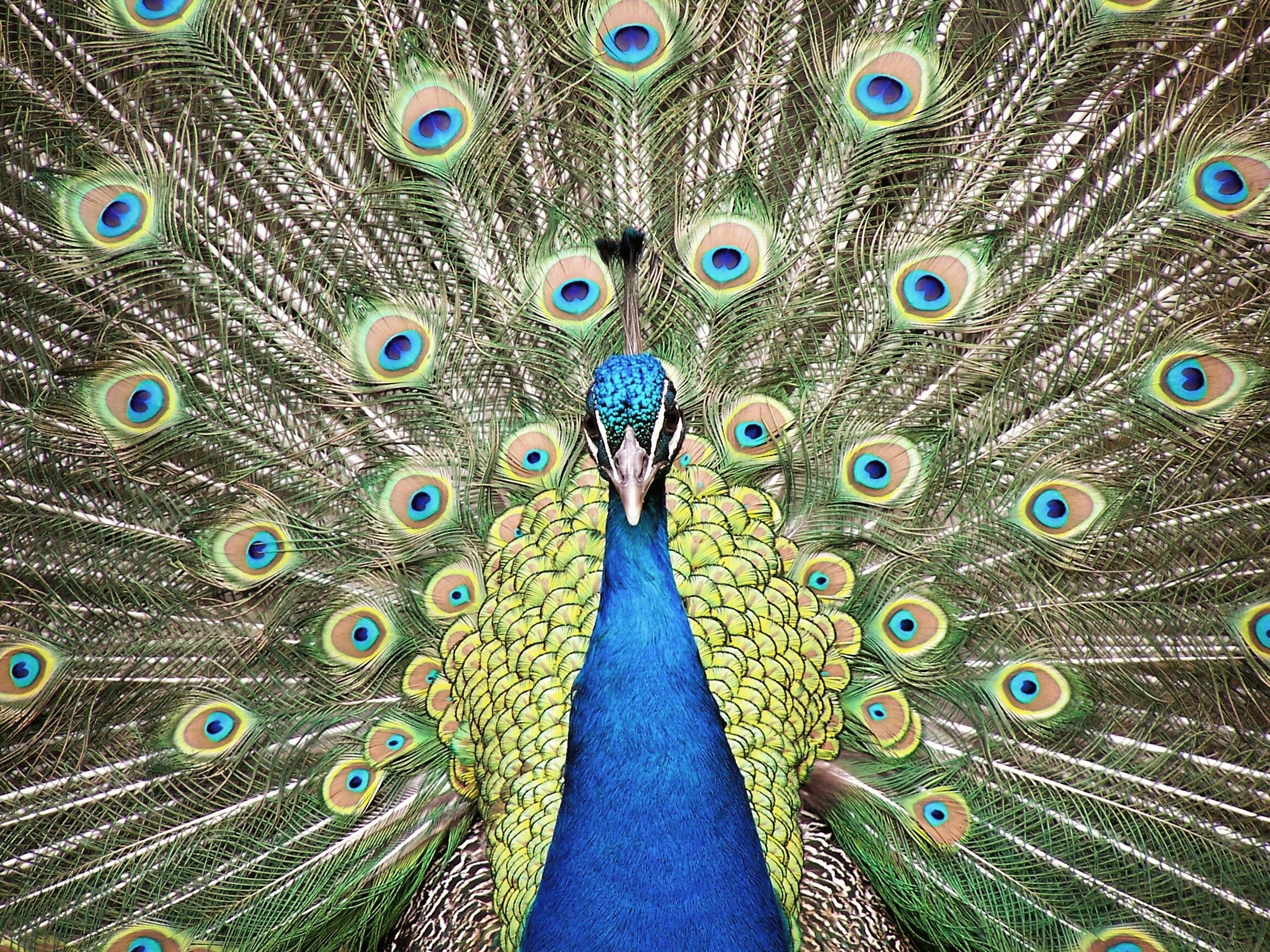
Pavonia, the first settlement by the Europeans took its name from a burgermeester of Amsterdam. Also an investor in Dutch West India Company (WIC), Michiel Reyniersz Pauw, purchased land along the banks of the Hudson in 1630 in order to establish a patroonship. Pavonia is a Latinized version of his surname, based on the word for peacock. The bouweries, plantages, and port that made up the settlement grew into the gemeente of Bergen.

== Polifly ==
From Dutch pole and vlaie, translated as "top of the meadow/atop the swamp"; the name by which the area of Hasbrouck Heights was known. Polifly Road is a major thoroughfare connecting Hackensack and Hasbrouck Heights.

== Pompton ==
Has been cited by some sources to mean a place where they catch soft fish.

== Paulus Hook ==
A tidal island, called Arresick by the Lenape the site where, in 1630, Michiel Reyniersz Pauw staked a claim for his attempted patroonship, Pavonia. Named after his agent, Michael Paulez (later Latinized to Paulus) who built a hut and ferry landing there, hoek or hoeck meaning a spit or point. Variations include Paulus Hoeck, Powles Hoek, Powles Hook.

== Preakness ==
From the munsi, quail woods. Alternatively, thought to mean young buck, depending on interpretation of the original word.

== Ramapo ==
Name for the mountains and river and towns, meaning underneath the rock, spellings: Ramapough, Ramopock.

== Raritan ==
The people, river, bay, and towns take their name from a derivation of Naraticong meaning river beyond the island (which, considering location, could be Staten Island). Some would believe that it comes from Roaton or Raritanghe, a tribe which had come from across the Hudson River and displaced the existing population of Sanhicans.

Alternatively, Raritan is a Dutch pronunciation of wawitan or rarachons meaning forked river or stream overflows.

== Sand Hoek ==
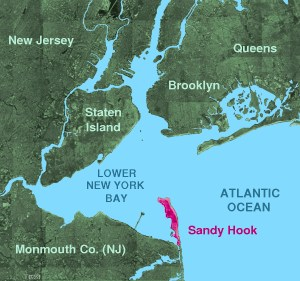
Sand Hoek

Sometimes called Sand Punt the peninsula around which most settlers to Fort Amsterdam, Fort Orange, Staten Eylandt, and Lange Eylandt, and Bergen sailed before entering The Narrows.

== Schraalenburgh ==
Built on a barren ridge, literally Barren Hills. Two churches still bear the name: South Schraalenburgh Church and Schraalenburgh North Church.

== Secaucus ==
Sukit meaning black and achgook meaning snake, hence black snakes. Spellings include Sekakes, Sikakes, Sickakus. Contemporary: seke meaning black and xkuk or achgook meaning snake. Locally, pronounced "SEE-kaw-cus", with the accent on the first syllable, not the second as often used by non-natives. Snake Hill, in Secaucus, is a geologic intrusion in the midst of the Meadowlands.

== Sicomac ==
Said to mean resting place for the departed or happy hunting ground since this area of Wyckoff, according to tradition, was the burial place of many Native Americans, possibly including Oratam, sagamore of the Hackensack Indians. Contemporary schikamik meaning hole or grave or machtschikamikunk meaning a burial place.

== Staaten Eylandt ==
To the Lenape, the island was known as Aquehonga, Manacknong and Eghquaons (Jackson, 1995). Named by colonists for the governing body of the 17th century United Provinces of the Netherlands, The States-General.

== Tantaqua ==
Overpeck Creek, site of Hackensack semi-permanent village, for one of the chiefs of the resident Lenape.

== Tappan ==
The region radiating from Palisades Interstate Park and its inhabitants as named by New Netherlanders, who spelled it as Tappaen. Site of the "bouwerie" Vriessendael.

Possibly from Tuphanne meaning cold water.

Likely more related to contemporary petapan meaning dawn or petapaniui meaning at the break of dawn, and relates to their kin across the river, the Wappinger, whose name is derived from the Algonquian people of the east or easterners. (Contemporary: Wapaneu meaning easterly and Wapanke meaning to-morrow.)

== Teaneck ==
Origin and meaning are uncertain, though possibly may mean the woods. An alternative is from the Dutch "Tiene Neck" meaning "neck where there are willows" (from the Dutch "tene" meaning willow).

== Tenafly ==
From Dutch ten and vlaie, hence Tiene Vly or Ten Swamps given by settlers in 1688.

== Watchung ==
The place of mountains from watchtsu, which describes the three ridges west of the Meadowlands.

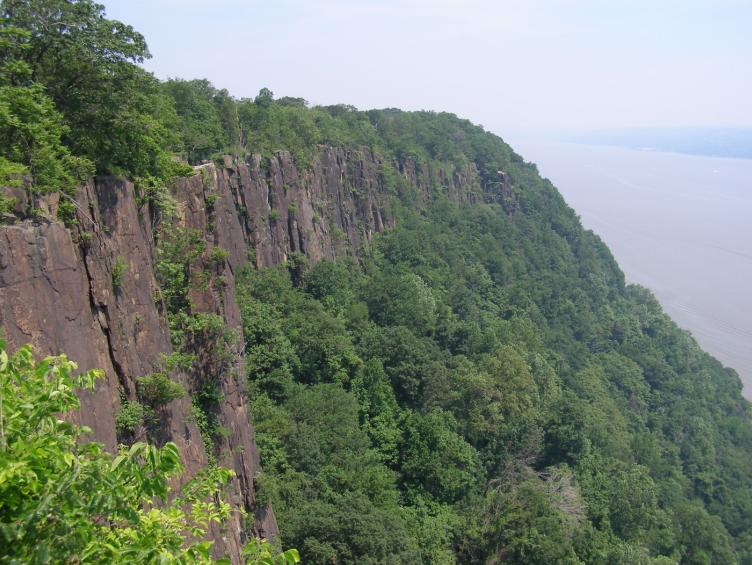
The Palisades

== Weehawken ==
Variously interpreted as or rocks that look like rows of trees or at the end of (the Palisades or stream that flowed from them.) and place of gulls.

Spelling have included: Awiehawken, Wiehacken, Weehauk, Weehawk, Weehock, Wiceaken, Wihaken, Wyhaken, and Wiehachan.

Curiously, Peter Minuit, first governor of New Netherland, sailed to the New World upon a ship called the "Seagull", or in Dutch, Het "Meeuwken" (which bears a striking resemblance).

== Weequahic ==
head of the cove.

== Vriessendael ==
Vriessendael was small bowery, or homestead established in 1640 at today's Edgewater, meaning Vries' Valley, after its founder David Pietersen de Vries.

== Pre-American Revolution Reformed Congregations in the Dutch Belt ==
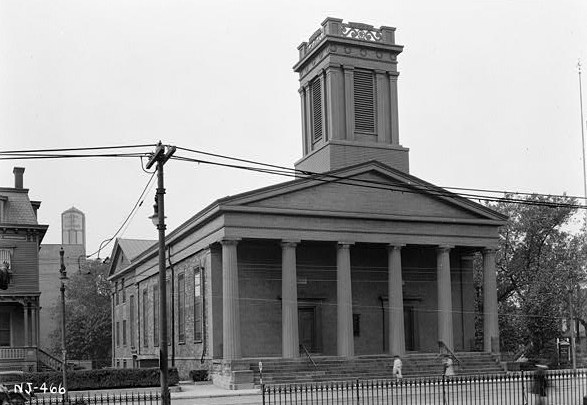
Old Bergen Church

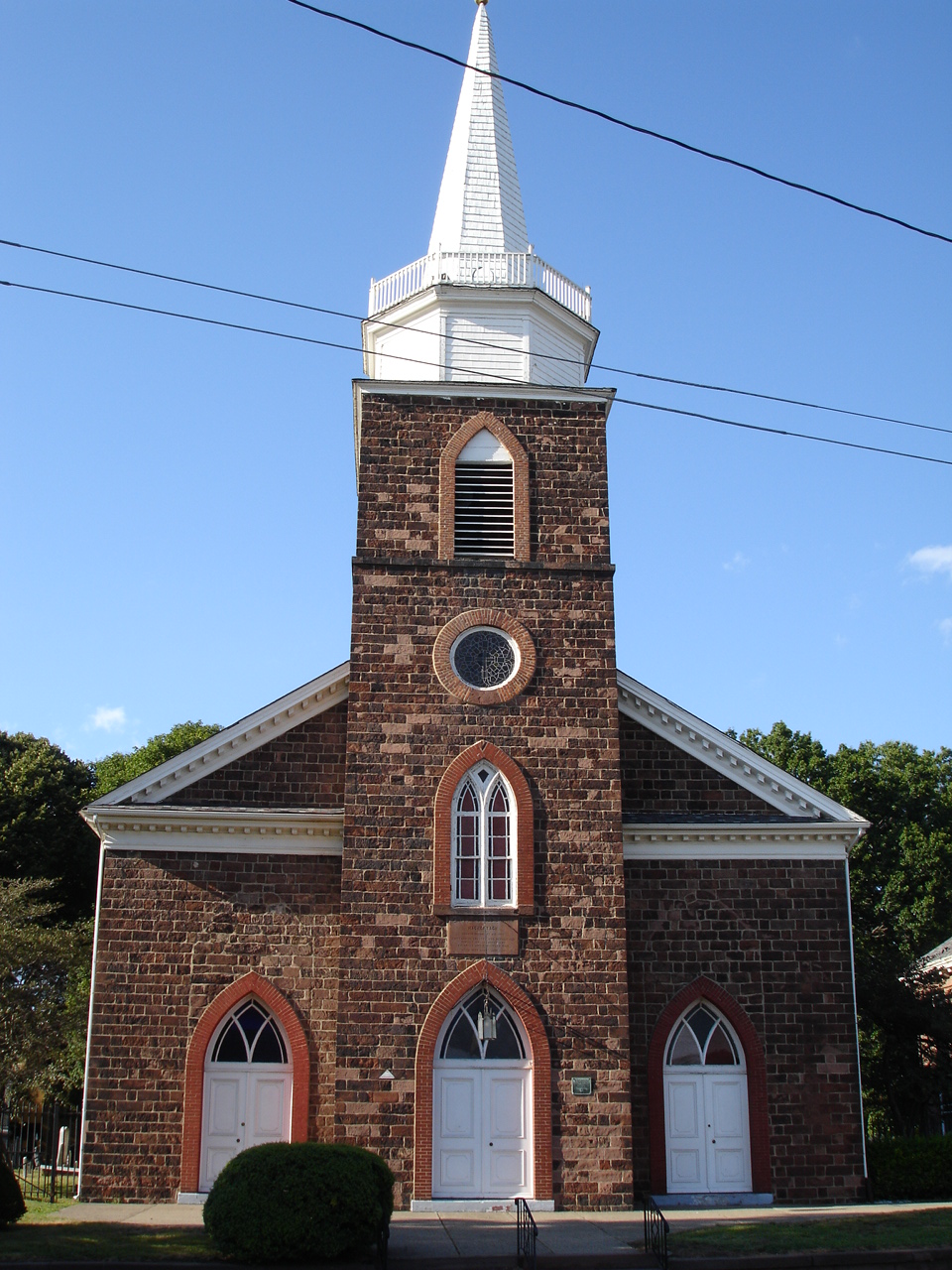
Hackensack

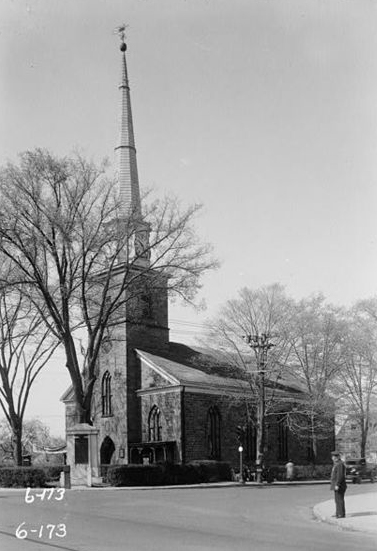
Schraalenburgh North Church

After the final transfer of power to the English (with the Treaty of Westminster) that settlers to New Netherland and their descendants spread across the region and established many of the towns and cities which exist today. The Dutch Reformed Church played an important role this expansion Following the course of the Hudson River in the north via New York Harbor to the Raritan River in the south, settlement and population grew along what George Washington called the "Dutch Belt". The American classis secured a charter in 1766 for Queens College (now Rutgers University), where the appointment in 1784 of John Henry Livingston as professor of theology marked the beginning of the New Brunswick Theological Seminary.

Year	Congregation
1660	Bergen at Bergen Square, now Jersey City
1693	Acquackanonk in Passaic
1694	Tappan
1696	Hackensack
1699	Brick in Marlboro
1700	Second River in Belleville
1703	Six Mile Run
1710	Ponds in Oakland
1717	New Brunswick
1717	Schaghticoke
1720	Fairfield
1724	Schraalenburgh now Dumont
1725	Paramus
1727	Harlingen
1736	Pompton Plains
1740	Ramapo in Mahwah
1755	Totowa in Paterson
1756	Montville
1770	Ridgefield in the English Neighborhood

== See also ==
- Toponymy of New Netherland
- Etymologies of place names in Hudson County, New Jersey
- New Netherland settlements
- North Jersey
- Gateway Region
