= Oratam =

Oratam (or Oritani)

Hackensack leader

Personal details
- Resting place: Sicomac, Wyckoff, NJ

Oratam (or Oritani/Oratamin) was sagamore, or sachem, of the Hackensack People living in northeastern New Jersey during the period of early European colonization in the 17th century. Documentation shows that he lived an unusually long life (almost 90 years) and was quite influential among indigenous and immigrant populations.

The Hackensacks were a sub-group of the Unami, or Turtle Clan, of the Lenni-Lenape, numbering close to a thousand. They occupied the territory called Ack-kinkas-hacky (various spellings include Achkinhenhcky, Achinigeu-hach, Ackingsah-sack). Essentially a sedentary, agricultural society, the Hackensacks set up seasonal campsites and practiced companion planting, hunting, trapping, fishing, and shell-fishing. They maintained a village near the Tantaqua (Overpeck Creek), while their council fire was located at Gamoenpa (Communipaw). Their territory roughly corresponds to the Upper New York Bay, Newark Bay, Bergen Neck, the Meadowlands, and the Palisades, in Hudson and Bergen Counties.

During Oratam's chieftaincy, the region was settled by New Netherland Dutch, an amalgam of northern Europeans. The New Netherland Dutch arrived in 1633, establishing Pavonia, with homesteads and ports at Paulus Hook, Communipaw, Harsimus, and Hoboken. Other settlements were Achter Col and Vriessendael. In 1661, the region was given a municipal charter and named Bergen.

The society of the Unami was based on governance by consensus, or unanimous agreement, which its leaders were obliged to follow or to abdicate. The totem of the turtle was held in great esteem by other groups, particularly as peacemakers. Having attained an old age, Oratam likely enjoyed a position of great honor and respect. Considered a sage negotiator, Oratam brokered many land deals, truces, and treaties between the native and colonizing peoples. On occasion he was aided by David Pietersz. de Vries, a Dutch landowner, and Sara Kiersted, a prominent New Amsterdammer who had mastered the Unami language, and to whom he made a large land grant in 1664.

It was within the bounds of Oratam's sachendom that one of the first genocides of Native Americans by European settlers took place. In February 1643, the governor of New Netherland William Kieft allowed the massacre of eighty Wecquaesgeek and Tappan who had taken refuge near one of the plantations at Harsimus in Pavonia. The Hackensacks, Tappans, and Montauks made common cause with the Wappinger, and retaliated by attacking "bouweries" (home farms) and plantations (outlying fields). By April, though, Oratam, representing the Tappans, Reckgawanacs (Manhattans), Kicktawancs, and Sintsinck, concluded a treaty with the New Netherlanders. Nonetheless, due to other events taking place, mostly on Long Island and in the Hudson Valley, hostilities escalated and what became known as Kieft's War continued for another two years. It was not until August 1645, at a "summit" in New Amsterdam in part organized by Oratam, that a truce was declared and a treaty signed.

For nearly ten years the two communities co-existed peacefully, if somewhat tenuously, in some measure due to Oratam's influence in not allowing incidents between the parties to escalate to violent confrontation. However, in 1655, the murder of a Hackensack woman found stealing peaches from the orchard of a Dutch farmer on Manhattan, opened the flood gates for the release of pent-up frustrations, and once again the colony of Pavonia was raided, requiring settlers there to abandon their farms. This incident initiated the Peach War. Oratam was likely involved in the return of some of the hostages who had been held at Paulus Hook.

In 1660 Oratam's diplomatic skills were again requested. After a year of conflict between the Esopus Indians (Lenape of the Munsee branch) and the New Netherlanders in Ulster County, the sachem of the Warranwonkongs asked Oratam to act as emissary to the government at New Amsterdam. Petrus Stuyvesant, who had become Director-General of New Netherland, enlisted his support, and Oratam traveled to the territory and organized a "conference" that lead to a treaty which temporarily ended the hostilities.

Oratam played a vital role in the negotiations for the sale of land to Robert Treat at what would grow to become Greater Newark in 1666.

A representation of Chief Oratam of the Achkinhenhcky appears on the Hackensack municipal seal.

He is said to have been buried in the Sicomac "happy hunting ground" in Wyckoff, New Jersey.

== See also ==
- Lappawinsoe
- Chief Wampage
