= English Neighborhood =

Colonial term for eastern Bergen County, New Jersey

Coordinates: 40.86°N 74.00°W

The English Neighborhood was the colonial-era name for the towns in eastern Bergen County, New Jersey, along the Hudson Palisades between the Hudson River and the Hackensack River, particularly around its main tributary, Overpeck Creek. The region had been part of the Dutch New Netherland colony of Bergen, whose main town was located at Bergen Square in modern Jersey City. The name refers to the geography of the region, bergen being the Dutch word for hills. Earlier attempts at settlement at Achter Col (after (the) hill) and Vriessendael had been compromised in conflicts with the precolonial population, bands of the Lenape known by their exonyms, the Hackensacks and the Tappans.

== History ==
After the surrender of Fort Amsterdam at the tip of Manhattan and annexation of the entire Dutch province by the British in 1664, northeastern New Jersey became part of the proprietary colony of East Jersey. In order to encourage settlement the land was quickly divided and a number of land titles were given or confirmed by the new government. While many were awarded to the existing New Netherlander population, many were given to migrating English and Huguenot settlers, some who may have come from Europe, many who made their way from New England, Long Island, or the West Indies. On June 10, 1669, Samuel Edsall, received a patent "for land betw. Hudson R. and Overpeck's", which encompassed much of the area. By 1675 it was being termed the English Neighborhood. Born in Reading, England about 1630, Edsall had come to New Amsterdam at the age of eighteen, where he was listed among the new arrivals as "a bever maker," or hatter. His industry, and possibly his marriage with Jannetje Wessels, qualified him as a small burgher and property owner. He began residence on Bergen Neck, learned the Lenape language, and acted as interpreter for Robert Treat's purchase of the Newark Tract. After the British conquest he was able to purchase of a tract of nearly two thousand acres, with a frontage of almost two and a half miles on the Hudson, extending northward from Bulls Ferry and stretching back to Overpeck Creek and the Hackensack River, siting his own farm near what is now Palisades Park. From time to time he sold or leased other parts of the estate.

In 1683, administrative districts in the form of counties were established, with Bergen County encompassing the land between the aforementioned rivers from Bergen Point in the south to the newly created and ambiguous boundary line with New York. In 1693, the county was divided into two townships, separated at the current Hudson-Bergen line, with Hackensack Township to the north and Bergen Township to the south. In 1710, the nearby village of Hackensack became the county seat.

Prior to the American Revolutionary War, a liberty pole was erected at a major crossroads, but the English Neighborhood was soon occupied by the British Army after George Washington's retreat from Fort Lee, which had crossed the area. The Continental Army maintained a presence in the area to observe the movement of the British in New York. Its position between the two armies resulted in many foraging parties and skirmishes, known sometimes as the Forage War. Major John André, executed for his collusion with Benedict Arnold, mentions the English Neighborhood in his poem The Cow Chase, in which he muses on the foiling of Anthony Wayne's attempt to secure cows from Bergen.

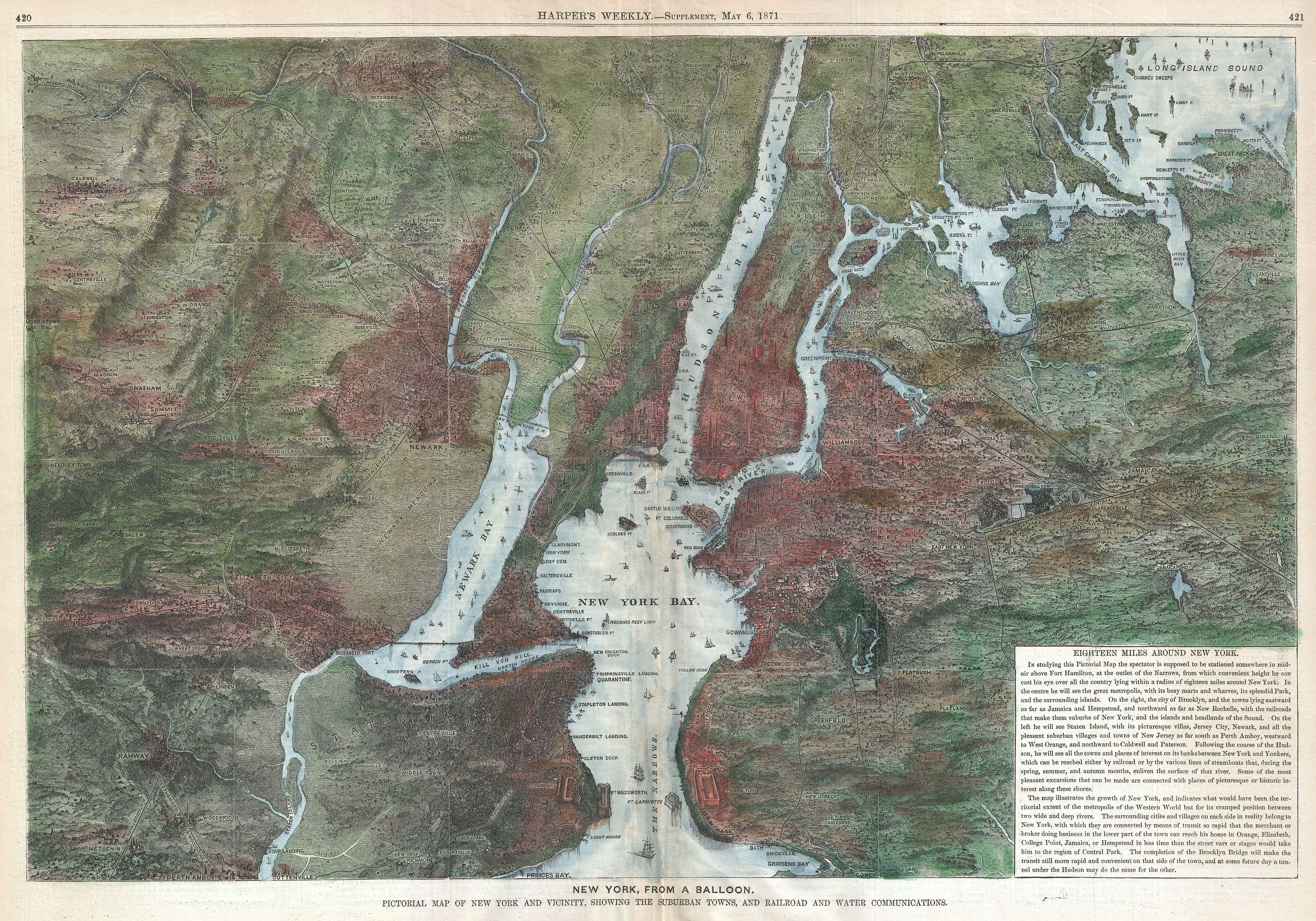
In 1871 Harpers Weekly View or Map of New York City from a Balloon the area is still described as the English Neighborhood.

On March 22, 1871, Hackensack Township was subdivided into three new Townships, each stretching from the Hudson River on the east to the Hackensack River in the west. The southernmost portion, the English Neighborhood, became Ridgefield Township. In 1878, the New Jersey Legislature provided for the formation of a borough within a township not exceeding four square miles. The passage of a revised Borough Act resulted in a series of subdivisions creating new boroughs. Municipalities created from Ridgefield Township (or portions thereof) were Bogota (1894), Leonia (1894), Undercliff (1894; renamed "Edgewater" in 1899), Fairview (1894), Teaneck (part) (1895), Cliffside Park (1895), Englewood (part) (1895), Palisades Park (1899). The creation of Fort Lee, New Jersey on April 18, 1904, put an end to Ridgefield Township.

The area underwent significant growth as its villages expanded and agricultural land was developed as suburbs, spurred by expansion of the railway system during the late 19th century. The Erie Railroad ran trains to its Hudson waterfront Pavonia Terminal (later via the Susquehanna Transfer with connecting bus service to Manhattan via the Lincoln Tunnel). The last train on the Northern Branch from the terminal to the area was on December 12, 1958. There are proposals to restore service with extension of a Hudson Bergen Light Rail line known as the Northern Branch Corridor Project.

Though the term English Neighborhood is no longer used much, there are still places which continue to bear the name. The Dutch Reformed Church in the English Neighborhood in Ridgefield was built in 1793 by a congregation established in 1770. In Fairview, the English Neighborhood Park and the English Neighborhood Public School are still used to describe places in part of the borough. The Union School of the English Neighborhood, moved from its original location, is a landmark in Englewood. The name also survives in the names of Englewood and Englewood Cliffs themselves, which derive from a corruption of English Neighborhood.

== See also ==
- Bergen, New Netherland
- Communipaw
- Harsimus
- Elizabethtown Tract
- Horseneck Tract
- Monmouth Tract
- New Bridge Landing
- Concession and Agreement
- National Register of Historic Places listings in Bergen County, New Jersey
- Congregation Adas Emuno (New Jersey)
- Others group of artists
- Koreatown, Palisades Park
