= Acquackanonk =

Acquackanonk refers to the region and people along the Passaic River in northern New Jersey:

- Acquackanonk tribe
- Acquackanonk Township, New Jersey
