= Sicomac, New Jersey =

Populated place in Bergen County, New Jersey, US

- Unincorporated community
- Location of Sicomac in Bergen County Inset: Location of county within the state of New Jersey Sicomac, New Jersey (New Jersey) Sicomac, New Jersey (the United States)
- Coordinates: 41.004387°N 74.188270°W
- Country: United States
- State: New Jersey
- County: Bergen
- Township: Wyckoff
- Time zone: UTC−05:00 (Eastern (EST))
  - Summer (DST): UTC−04:00 (Eastern (EDT))
- Area code: 201

Sicomac is an unincorporated community located within Wyckoff, in Bergen County, in the U.S. state of New Jersey.

The first known human inhabitants of the area were the Lenni Lenape Native Americans who lived north of the Raritan River and spoke a Munsee dialect of Algonquian. The Hackensack and Tappan Indians spoke the Unami Lenape dialect the distinct difference between Unami and Munsee us Unami used the letter R along with its sound such as Chief Oritam; the Munsee language did not have the letter R or sound in the language, according to the anthropologist Evan Pritchard. Sicomac, said to mean "resting place for the departed" or "happy hunting ground", is an area of Wyckoff that, according to tradition, was the burial place of many Native Americans, including Chief Oratam of the Ackingshacys, and many stores and buildings there are named after the area's name, including Sicomac Elementary School. Most Native Americans had left by the 19th century, although a small group lived near Clinton Avenue until 1939.

It has also been interpreted as black fish.
