= Achter Kol, New Netherland =

Coordinates: 40.71°N 74.12°W

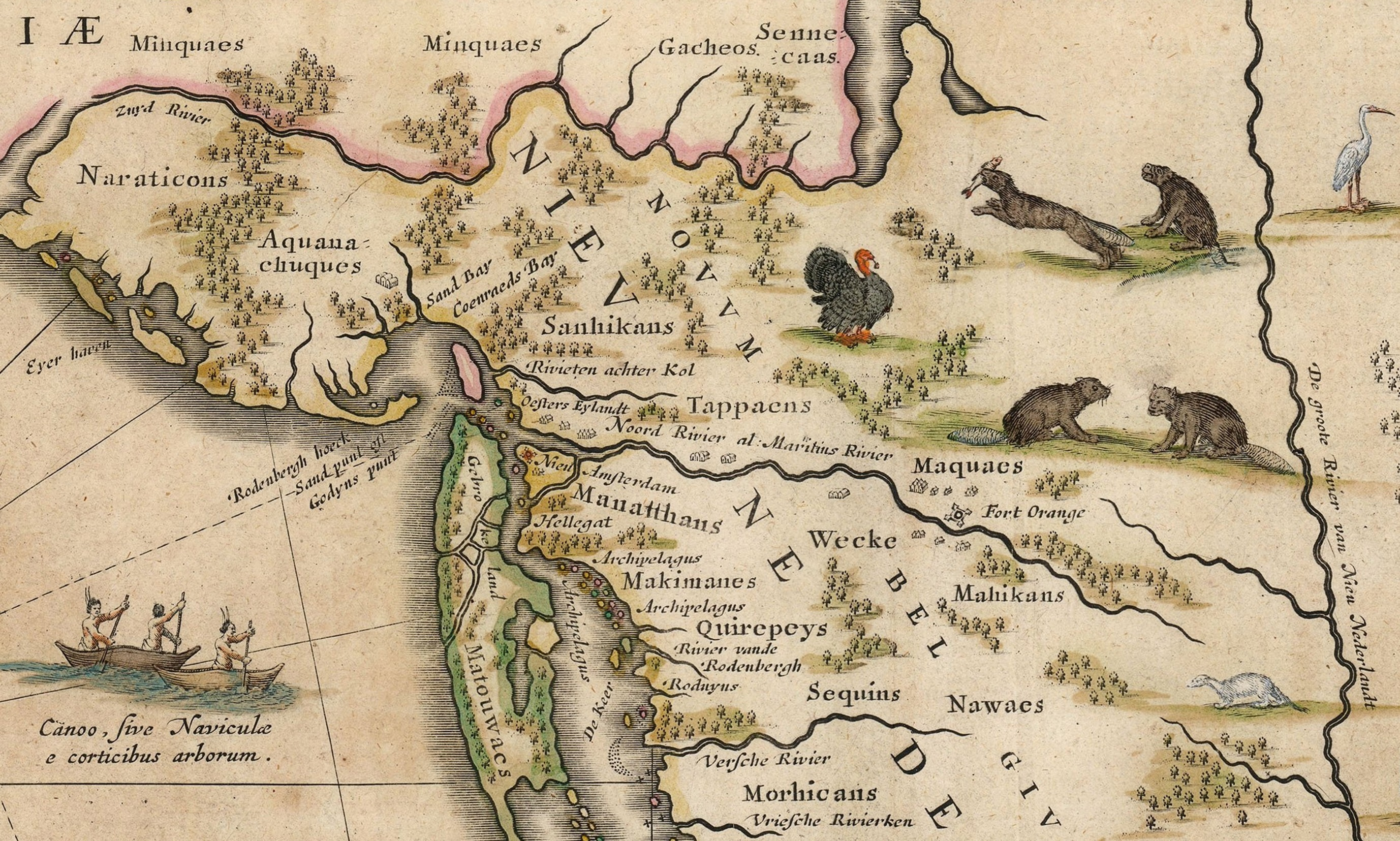
Map c.1634 (with North to the right). Achter Col is described as Rivieren achter Kol, or rivers behind the ridge or "rivers of the rear pass".

Achter Kol (or Achter Col) was the name given to the region around the Newark Bay and Hackensack River in northeastern New Jersey by the first European settlers to it and was part of the 17th century province of New Netherland, administered by the Dutch West India Company. At the time of their arrival, the area was inhabited by the Hackensack and Raritan groups of Lenape natives.

== Toponymy ==
Placenaming by Dutch explorers and settlers during the era often referred to a location in reference to other places, its shape, its topography, and other geographic qualities. Newark Bay is connected to Upper New York Bay by the Kill Van Kull and to Raritan Bay by the Arthur Kill. The names of the channels represent the period of Dutch colonialization. The area around the bay and the rivers that feed it was termed Achter Kol. (achter meaning after or behind. and col meaning a ridge or mountain pass) which translates as behind or beyond the ridge and refers to Bergen Hill. The emergence of the Hudson Palisades begins on Bergen Neck, the peninsula between the bay and the Hudson River. Kille in Dutch means stream or channel. During the British colonial era the bay was known as Cull bay. Kill van Kull literally translates as channel of the ridge. Arthur Kill is an anglicisation of achter kill meaning back channel, which represents its location behind Staten Island.

== Early settlement ==
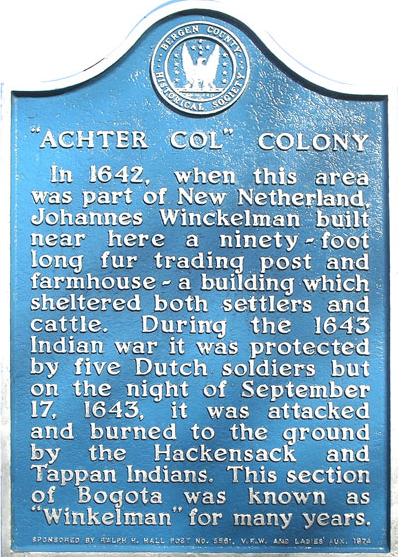

Achter Kol was near the patroonship named Pavonia, patented in 1630, and reverted to the Dutch West India Company in 1636. Homesteads of Pavonia were clustered at Communipaw and Harsimus on the North River (Hudson River). David Pietersz. de Vries (c. 1593—c. 1655), a Dutch sea captain, explorer, and trader, who had established settlements at the Zwaanendael Colony, Staten Island, and nearby Vriessendael, as was an early European proprietor of the area. In his "Korte Historiael Ende Journaels Aenteyckeninge" (Short Historical Notes and Journal Notes of Various Voyages), published in 1655, de Vries described a Lenape hunt in the valley of the Achinigeu-hach (or Ackingsah-sack) in which one hundred or more men stood in a line many paces from each other, beating thigh bones on their palms to drive animals to the river, where they could be killed easily. Other methods of hunting included lassoing and drowning deer, as well as forming a circle around prey and setting the brush on fire.

In 1642, Myndert Myndertsen received a patroonship for much of the land north of the Newark Bay. An absentee landlord, Myndertsen hired a superintendent Johannes Winckelman to construct a farmhouse (a combined dwelling and barn), completed the same year. The homestead was at present day Bogota near the Hackensack tribe's encampment at Tantanqua, the modern Overpeck Creek. Originally spared in the reprisals for the attacks at Pavonia and Corlear's Hook that began Kieft's War in 1643, the residents were ordered back to the relative safety of Fort Amsterdam and replaced by a regiment of soldiers with cannons. Perceived as an act of war by the Hackensack it was later plundered and destroyed. The Achter Col Colony was not replaced. The area was later settled and become known as the English Neighborhood.

After some time, relations with the Hackensack Lenape improved. Oratam, the sachem, or sagamore, of the Hackensack engaged peacefully with representatives of the Dutch West India Company. Both parties were helped considerably by Sarah Kiersted, who had mastered the Algonquian language and acted as translator and scribe. For her help Oratam, in 1666, gave her a large tract of (2260 acres) at Achinigeu-hach (or "Ackingsah-sack") between the Hackensack River and Overpeck Creek in gratitude for her work as emissary and interpreter. In late 1654 a series of grants were made for land "achter Kol", which became the small communities of Pamrapo and Minkakwa. Eventually, Oratam, deeded the land to the Dutch in 1665. A representation of Chief Oratam of the Achkinhenhcky appears on the Hackensack municipal seal. By that time the lands west of the Hudson River (modern Hudson County, the Palisades, the Meadowlands, and the Hackensack River Valley) was termed Bergen. Its administrative headquarters at the garrisoned village at modern Bergen Square were later established in 1660.

When the area was taken by the English it kept its Dutch name and in 1675, the East Jersey Legislature officially established the first four counties of present-day New Jersey, (Bergen, Essex, Middlesex, and Monmouth). Philip Cartaret, governor of the proprietary colony granted land to Captain John Berry in the southern part of area where he soon afterward began residence and named it New Barbadoes, after the island of Barbados, where he had resided.

== See also ==
- Bergen
- Bergen Township
- Elizabethtown Tract
- Pavonia
- Patroon
- Vriessendael
- English Neighborhood
