= Cornerstone Church of Christ =

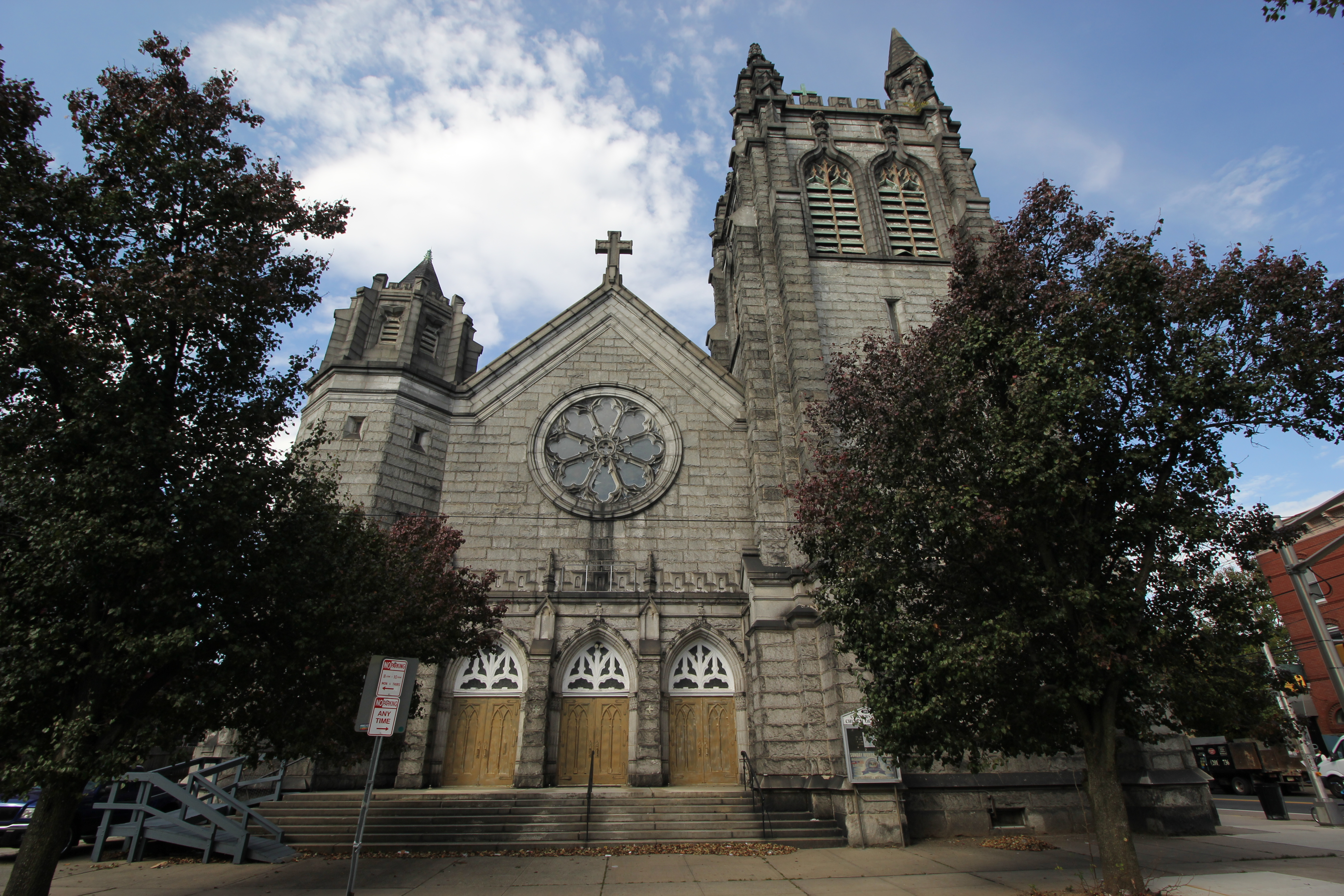
- Cornerstone Church of Christ
- 40.71144°N 74.06300°W
- Location: Jersey City, New Jersey
- Country: United States
- Denomination: Christian
- Previous denomination: Roman Catholic

History
- Former name: All Saints Church
- Consecrated: September 9, 1906

Architecture
- Architect: John T. Rowland
- Style: English Gothic
- Completed: 1908

Specifications
- Materials: Granite

The Cornerstone Church of Christ is a Christian church in the Communipaw neighborhood of Jersey City, New Jersey. The church was originally founded as All Saints Church in 1906 and was the third oldest Roman Catholic Church building in Jersey City.

== History ==
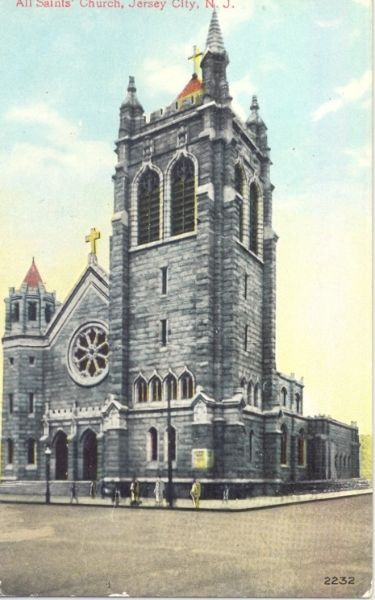
Postcard of All Saints Church in Jersey City, New Jersey

The church's cornerstone was laid in 1906 and unveiled to a crowd of approximately 5,000 people. The church and rectory, constructed with North Carolina granite in an English Gothic style, was completed in early 1908 for $290,000. The church was built to accommodate a growing Catholic community.

In 1977, a four-alarm fire partially destroyed the original Cornerstone Church of Christ on Ocean Avenue in the Greenville area of Jersey City. The high cost of repairs made rebuilding church impractical. In 1979, All Saints Church announced it would be merging with Assumption of the Blessed Virgin Mary Church due to a decrease in membership and increased in financial strain. In 1980, a deal was finalized for All Saints to sell their church building to Cornerstone Church of Christ, resolving challenges for both congregations.
