= Acquackanonk Township, New Jersey =

Former township in New Jersey, United States (1693–1917)

Acquackanonk Township
- Township
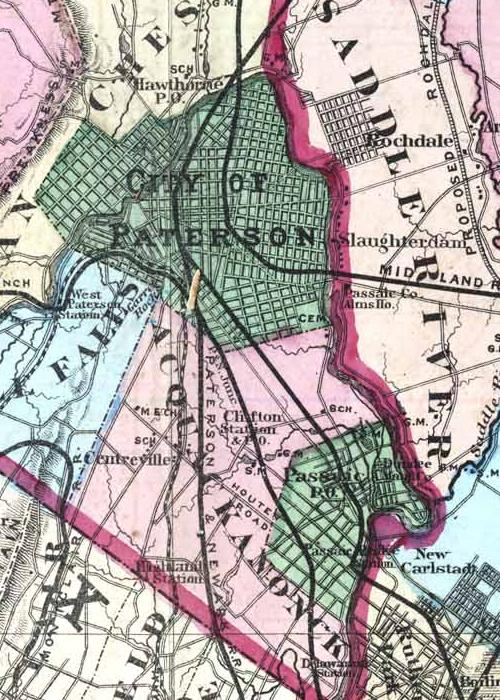
- Acquackanonk Township in 1872
- Coordinates: 40°51′41″N 74°9′32″W
- Country: United States
- State: New Jersey
- County: Passaic County
- Established: 1693

Acquackanonk Township was a township that existed in New Jersey, United States, from 1693 until 1917, first in Essex County and then in Passaic County.

== History ==
=== Patent ===
The land on which the town was situated was at one time owned by the Surveyor General of New Netherland Jacques Cortelyou, some "12,000 morgens at Aquackanonk on the Passaic, purchased by himself and associates of the Indians." and known as the Acquackanonk Patent. It was first settled in 1678 by Dutch traders, who in 1693 formed the Acquackanonk congregation of the Dutch Reformed Church, variantly named as late as 1697 as the Achquegnonck congregation.

The township was first formed on October 31, 1693, by the proprietors of the Province of East Jersey together with New Barbadoes Township, and was located in what was then the northern part of Essex County on the Passaic River. The English formed the Province of New Jersey and appointed a royal governor in 1702. New Barbadoes Township became part of Bergen County in 1710, with Acquackanonk still part of Essex County.

On February 21, 1798, Acquackanonk was incorporated as one of the initial group of 104 townships in the State of New Jersey. On February 7, 1837, Passaic County was created, incorporating the township and other portions of both Bergen County and Essex County. Over the years portions of the township were taken to create (or add to the territory of) Caldwell Township (February 16, 1798; now Fairfield Township), Paterson Township (April 11, 1831), Little Falls (April 2, 1868), Passaic village (created within the township on March 10, 1869, and independent from the township as of March 21, 1871), Paterson (1869) and Montclair (1907). The township became defunct on April 26, 1917, with the creation of Clifton.

== Acquackanonk tribe ==
The Acquackanonk were a Lenape group who spoke the same Algonquian language dialect and shared the same totem (turtle) as the neighboring Hackensack and Tappan. They were so called by the exonym by the New Netherlanders, who commonly referred to the people by the indigenous word for their territory. The name may mean a place in a rapid stream where fishing is done with a net. Alternatively, at the lamprey stream from contemporary axkwaakahnung (spellings include Achquakanonk, Acquackanonk) Lastly it may mean where gum blocks were made for pounding corn. Ackquekenon was the spelling used by European explorer Jasper Danckaerts in 1679 describe his visit there.

== Passaic River crossing ==
A bridge crossing of the Passaic River at Acquackanonk was first created in the colonial era, and was used during Washington's 1776 great retreat from Fort Lee. Today's Gregory Avenue Bridge was built on a slightly different alignment.

== See also ==
- Bergen Township
- Elizabethtown
