= Dutch Reformed Church in the English Neighborhood =

Historic church in New Jersey, United States

- U.S. National Register of Historic Places
- New Jersey Register of Historic Places
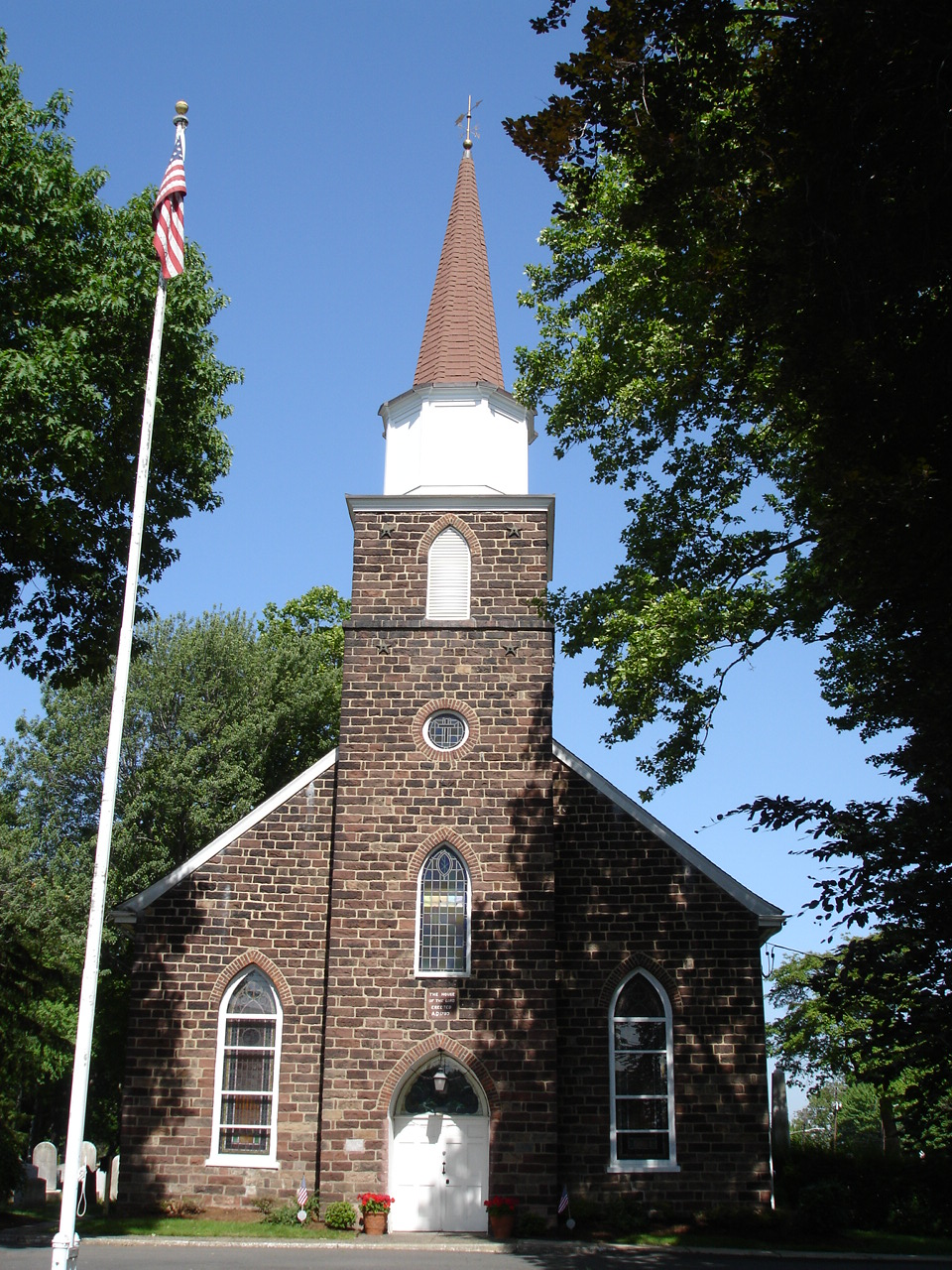
- The Dutch Reformed Church in Ridgefield, New Jersey in spring 2007

- Location within Bergen County, New Jersey Location within New Jersey Location within the United States
- Location: 1040 Edgewater Avenue, Ridgefield, New Jersey
- Coordinates: 40°50′03″N 74°00′46″W
- Area: 5.8 acres (2.3 ha)
- Built: 1793
- Architectural style: Federal, Gothic Revival
- NRHP reference No.: 98001181
- NJRHP No.: 2961

Significant dates
- Added to NRHP: September 18, 1998
- Designated NJRHP: July 16, 1998

Dutch Reformed Church in the English Neighborhood (English Neighborhood Reformed Church of Ridgefield) is a historic church at 1040 Edgewater Avenue in Ridgefield, Bergen County, New Jersey, United States. The church was built in 1793 and added to the National Register of Historic Places on September 18, 1998.

== Notable burials ==
- Alexander Shaler

== See also ==
- National Register of Historic Places listings in Bergen County, New Jersey
- English Neighborhood
