= Horseneck Tract =

Region in New Jersey, United States

The Horseneck Tract was an area in present-day Essex County, New Jersey, United States, that consisted of what are now the municipalities of Caldwell, West Caldwell, North Caldwell, Verona, Cedar Grove, Essex Fells, Roseland, and portions of Fairfield, Livingston and West Orange.

== History ==
On May 1, 1701, Dutch Settlers Simon Van Ness, Gerebrand Clawson, Hans Spier, Elias Franson, Christopher Steinmets, Andrese Louwrentz, Garret Vanderhoof, Hessell Pieters, and Jan Spier, bought from the Indians a large tract of land at Horseneck. This acreage was not specified, no survey data were given, and all of the boundaries were Lenape-named points and places. The dimensions and location were clarified in a 1766 survey by Thomas Ball, described as "Map of part of Horseneck tract, Copied from a Map Made by Tho. Ball, at the request of the possessors Claimants Under a pretended Indian Title, in 1766, exhibited to the Arbitrators between them and the proprietors."

Meanwhile, the Town of Newark established a committee in 1699 to negotiate the "purchase of a tract of Land lying Westward of our Bounds, to the South Branch of Passaick River." As a result English settlers from Newark made a purchase from the Indians of land "Westward or northward of Newark within the compass of the Passaick River, and so southward unto Minisink Path," a deed bearing the date March 1701-2 for 130 pounds New York currency. The settlers later claimed the document was lost in a fire, and it was reissued by Native representatives in 1744. This deed covered the area immediately south of the above tract. Based on archival materials, one historian has reconstructed the placement of these and other tracts.

Under the colonial land-grant system in New Jersey, Indian deeds were only one stage in the process of acquiring legal title. The next stage would have been a purchase from the East Jersey Proprietors, the corporation to which the English had assigned land rights. For reasons unknown, the settlers did not complete this stage, and another group of wealthy landowners acquired the legal title instead. These landowners attempted to collect quit-rents (a form of property tax) from the settlers or to evict them, touching off decades of instability and violence known as the Horseheck Riots.

The name Horseneck was gradually lost. On February 17, 1787, the congregation of the First Presbyterian Church at Horseneck voted to change the name of its parish to Caldwell, in honor of Reverend James Caldwell who helped them organize the church. After this date the church became known as the First Presbyterian Church at Caldwell. Non-parish areas of Horseneck retained the name until 1798, when the westernmost portion of Newark Township was renamed Caldwell Township by the State of New Jersey.

Caldwell Borough contained what is today the towns of West Caldwell and Caldwell. Soon after, the area of Caldwell Township, just to the east of Caldwell Borough, between Caldwell Borough and Montclair (present-day Verona and Cedar Grove), decided to follow Caldwell's lead and incorporated itself as its own borough, Verona. At around the same time, the area north of Caldwell Borough became its own town, North Caldwell. The wooded area directly to the southeast of downtown Caldwell Borough became Essex Fells, while the farmland to the south of Caldwell township was briefly called South Caldwell. This area underwent other changes when the towns of Livingston and West Orange expanded. The South Caldwell region, still part of Caldwell Township, became Roseland.

At this point, all that remained of the original Caldwell Township was 6,624 acres of farmlands and undeveloped meadows in the northwesternmost part of Essex County. Eventually, in 1963, Caldwell Township changed its name to Fairfield to avoid confusion with Caldwell Borough.

Horseneck Road is one of the few remaining traces of the name today.

== See also ==
- Elizabethtown Tract
- English Neighborhood
- Monmouth Tract
- New Barbadoes Neck
- Newark Tract
- West Essex
