= Vriessendael, New Netherland =

Coordinates: 40°50.034′N 73°58.311′W

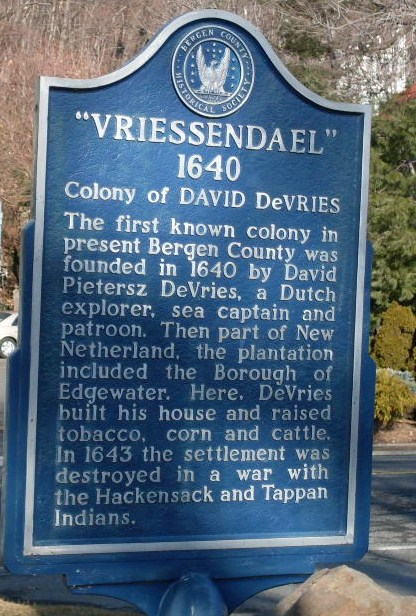
Historical marker in Edgewater, NJ placed by Bergen County Historical Society

Vriessendael was a patroonship on the west bank of the Hudson River in New Netherland, the seventeenth century North American colonial province of the Dutch Empire. The homestead or plantation was located on a tract of about 500 acres (2.0 km^{2}) about an hour's walk north of Communipaw at today's Edgewater. It has also been known as Tappan, which referred to the wider region of the New Jersey Palisades, rising above the river on both sides of the New York/New Jersey state line, and to the indigenous people who lived there and were part of wider group known as Lenape (later called Delaware Indian). It was established in 1640 by David Pietersen de Vries (c. 1593-c.1655), a Dutch sea captain, explorer, and trader who had also established settlements at the Zwaanendael Colony and on Staten Island. The name can roughly be translated as De Vries' Valley. De Vries also owned flatlands along the Hackensack River, in the area named by the Dutch settlers Achter Col. Parts of Vriessendael were destroyed in 1643 in reprisal for the slaughter of Tappan and Wecquaesgeek Native Americans who had taken refuge at Pavonia and Corlears Hook. The patroon's relatively good relations with the Lenape prevented the murder of the plantation's residents, who were able to seek sanctuary in the main house, and later flee to New Amsterdam. The incident was one of the first of many to take place during Kieft's War, a series of often bloody conflicts with bands of Lenape, who had united in face of attacks ordered by the Director of New Netherland.

== See also ==
- Achter Col
- English Neighborhood
- Communipaw
- Bergen, New Netherland
- Hackensack Indians
- Haverstraw Indian
- Harsimus
- Maryn Adriansen
- Patroon
- Pavonia
- Rensselaerswyck
- Zwaanendael
