= Acquackanonk people =

Native American Lenape group

Coordinates: 40.9363°N 74.0259°W

The Acquackanonk were a Lenape group whose territory was on the Passaic River in northern New Jersey. They spoke the same dialect (Unami) and shared the same totem (turtle) as the neighboring Hackensack, Tappan and Rumachenanck (later called the Haverstraw). It may mean a place in a rapid stream where fishing is done with a net. Alternatively, at the lamprey stream from contemporary axkwaakahnung (spellings include Achquakanonk, Acquackanonk) Lastly it may mean where gum blocks were made for pounding corn. Ackquekenon was spelling used by European explorer Jasper Danckaerts in 1679.

Part of the territory which they inhabited came into the possession of the Surveyor General of New Netherland Jacques Cortelyou, some "12,000 morgens at Aquackanonk on the Passaic, purchased by himself and associates of the Indians." A deed for the land (for Hans Didereck and others) is dated March 25, 1676. It was first settled in 1678 by Dutch traders, who in 1693 formed a Dutch Reformed congregation.

Acquackanonk Township was incorporated in 1693. It was located in the northern part of Essex County, New Jersey. In 1837, Passaic County was created, incorporating this township and some portions of both Bergen County and Essex County. When formed, the township included parts of present-day Clifton, Paterson and Passaic.
