= Bergen Township, New Jersey (1661–1862) =

Township in New Jersey, United States (1661–1862)

Coordinates: 40.767°N 74.038°W

Bergen Township was a township that existed in the U.S. state of New Jersey, from 1661 to 1862, first as Bergen, New Netherland, then as part Bergen County, and later as part of Hudson County. Several places still bear the name: the township of North Bergen; Bergen Square, Old Bergen Road, Bergen Avenue, Bergen Junction, Bergen Hill and Bergen Arches in Jersey City; Bergen Point in Bayonne; and Bergenline Avenue and Bergen Turnpike in North Hudson.

== New Netherland ==
The name Bergen was originally given to the peninsula between the Hudson River and Hackensack River by the European settlers to New Netherland. There are various opinions as to the origin. Some believe it comes from the Dutch word bergen, which in the Germanic languages of northern Europe means hills, and could describe the most distinct geological feature of the region, The Palisades. A more farfetched interpretation is that it comes from the Dutch word bergen, meaning to save or to recover, inspired by the settlers return after they had fled attacks by the native population during the Peach War in 1655. Others say it is so called for the town of Bergen, North Holland in the Netherlands or (less likely) Bergen op Zoom, also in the Netherlands or the city of Bergen in Norway. Another theory is that the Dutch residents named their city after an early Scandinavian settler of New Amsterdam, Hans Hansen Bergen, who arrived in Manhattan in 1633 as a ship's carpenter. Bergen initially settled on Pearl Street in Lower Manhattan and later owned extensive plantations elsewhere on the island, none of which were in Bergen Township. Bergen was the first husband of Sarah Rapelje, the first white child in New Netherland, and father to seven of her children. From Bergen, Norway, he was one of the few Scandinavian settlers of New Amsterdam.

Previous European settlements in present-day Hudson County included a small town called Communipaw (at the current Liberty Science Center) and other settlements that were all within Pavonia, which included only the lands surrounding of Harsimus Island (Harsimus), Aressick (Paulus Hook) and Hobocan Hacking (Hoebuck), all of which had been burned to the ground twice after an unprovoked massacre of Native Americans in 1643 at Communipaw and a series of raids and reprisals between the Netherlanders and the Lenape that followed, in what is known as Kieft's War and the Peach War. In late 1654 a series of land grants were made for farms for lands at Achter Col behind Kill Van Kull. In 1658, Peter Stuyvesant, Director-General of New Netherland, negotiated a deal with the Lenape, and re-purchased the area, naming it Bergen, "by the great rock above Wiehacken," then taking in the sweep of land on the peninsula west of the Hudson and east of the Hackensack River extending down to the Kill Van Kull at Bergen Point and Constable Hook. Bergen was founded by settlers who wished to return to the west bank of Hudson's River and located the village at what is today's Bergen Square. Its semi-independent government was granted on September 5, 1661, by Stuyvesant, as part of his efforts regain a foothold on the North River's western shore and expand beyond New Amsterdam on the southern tip of Manhattan, under the condition that a garrison be built. It is the first permanent European settlement and oldest municipality in what would become the state of New Jersey. It became and remained the seat of government for the province until 1709, when the British moved it to Hackensack, which was seen as more centrally located.

== Colonial America ==
In 1664, a negotiated surrender gave control of New Netherland to the English and on September 22, 1668, the original town charter was confirmed by Philip Carteret, the first English provincial Governor of New Jersey. The Treaty of Westminster finalized the Dutch capitulation in 1674, and the area officially became part of the proprietary colony of East Jersey. In 1675, it was divided in four administrative districts, or counties: Essex, Middlesex, Monmouth, and Bergen. On March 7, 1683, the garrison/village at Bergen and surrounding areas became a town within Bergen County.

In 1710, when Bergen County, by royal decree of Queen Anne of Great Britain, was enlarged to include what had been part of Essex County, the village of Hackensack (in the newly formed Township of New Barbadoes) was seen as being more easily reached by the majority of Bergen County's inhabitants, and hence was chosen as the county seat (as it remains today). Bergen was re-established by royal charter on January 4, 1714.

Bergen Township was created by the New Jersey Legislature's Township Act of 1798 on February 21, 1798, as one of the first group of 104 townships formed in New Jersey. Bergen County was thus split into two parts: Bergen Township to the south, and Hackensack Township to the north. As originally constituted, Bergen Township included the area between the Hudson River on the east, the Hackensack River to the west, south to Constable Hook and north to the present-day southern border of Bergen County.

== Secession and dissolution ==
During its 200-year history the township was diminished in size through various secessions until it finally dissolved.

On January 28, 1820, Jersey City was formed within Bergen Township, and in 1838, was reincorporated as a city independent of Bergen Township.

On February 22, 1840, the New Jersey Legislature created Hudson County from southern portions of Bergen County. The new county included the entirety of the original Bergen Township (including Jersey City) and the portions of Lodi Township south of today's Paterson Plank Road, an area known as New Barbadoes Neck.

Portions of the township were taken to form Van Vorst Township (April 12, 1841, annexed by Jersey City on March 18, 1851), North Bergen Township (April 10, 1843), Bergen town (March 24, 1855, ultimately annexed by Jersey City on May 2, 1870) and Bayonne Township (April 1, 1861).

The remaining portions of the township were absorbed by Bergen town, in a sort of reverse takeover, and the township was dissolved on March 11, 1862.

North Bergen was incorporated as a township on April 10, 1843, by an act of the New Jersey Legislature, from Bergen Township. Portions of the township have been taken to form Hoboken Township (April 9, 1849, now the city of Hoboken), Hudson Town (April 12, 1852, later part of Hudson City), Hudson City (April 11, 1855, later annexed by Jersey City), Guttenberg (formed within the township on March 9, 1859, and set off as an independent municipality on April 1, 1878), Weehawken (March 15, 1859), Union Township and West Hoboken Township (both created on February 28, 1861), Union Hill (March 29, 1864) and Secaucus (March 12, 1900).

== See also ==
- Acquackanonk Township
- Elizabeth Township
- Township Act of 1798

== Sources ==
- "History of Bergen County, New Jersey, 1630–1923;" by "Westervelt, Frances A. (Frances Augusta), 1858–1942."
- "Municipal Incorporations of the State of New Jersey (according to Counties)" prepared by the Division of Local Government, Department of the Treasury (New Jersey); December 1, 1958.
