= Hackensack people =

Indigenous people in the United States

Hackensack was the exonym given by the Dutch colonists to a band of the Lenape, a Native American tribe. The name is a Dutch derivation of the Lenape word for what is now the region of northeastern New Jersey along the Hudson and Hackensack rivers. While the Lenape people occupied much of the mid-Atlantic area, Europeans referred to small groups of native people by the names associated with the places where they lived.

== Territory and society ==
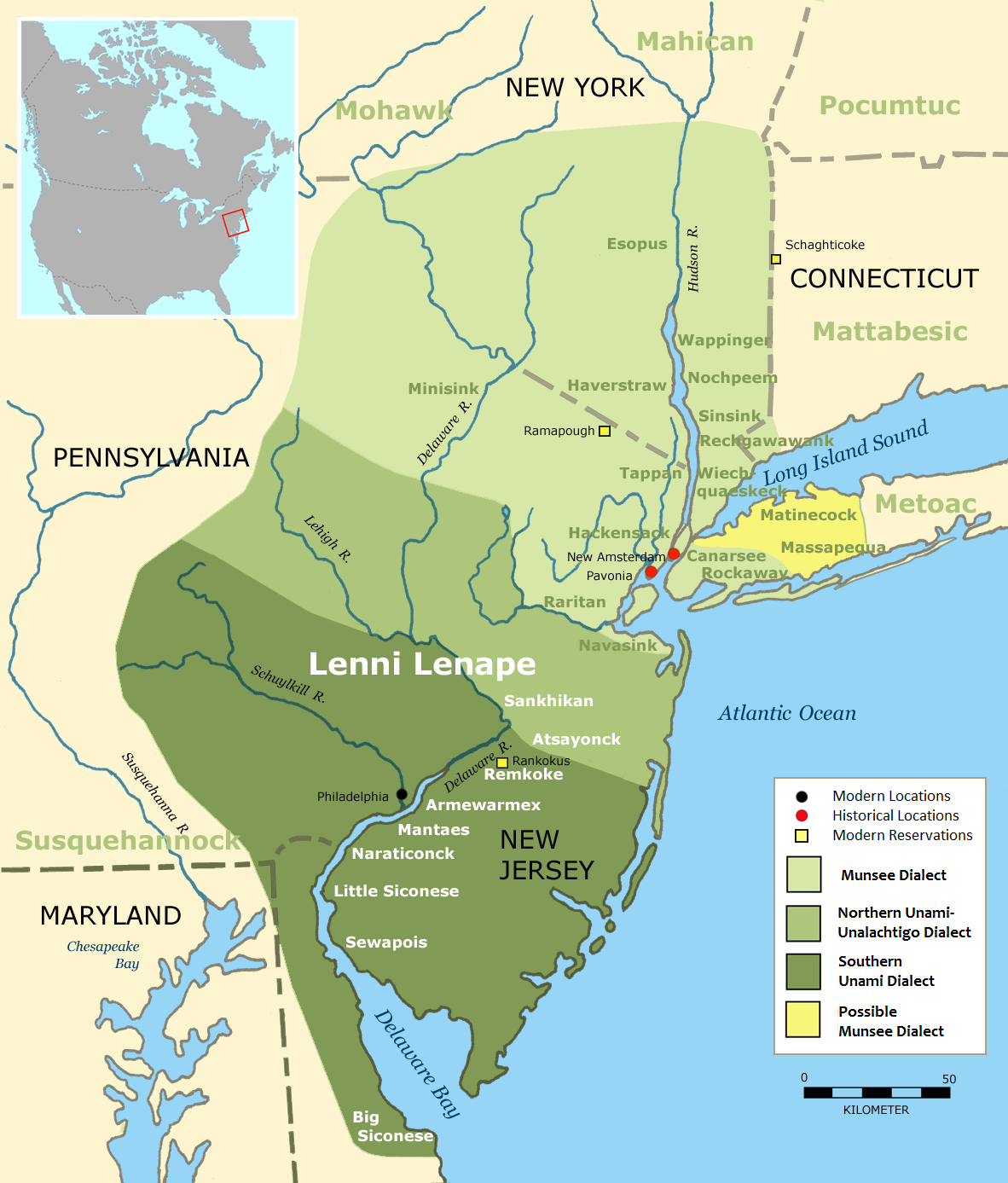
Hackensack territory shown in relation to other groups

The territory of the Hackensack was variously called Ack-kinkas-hacky, Achkinhenhcky, Achinigeu-hach, Ackingsah-sack, among other spellings (translated as "place of stony ground" or "mouth of a river") and included the areas around the Upper New York Bay, Newark Bay, Bergen Neck, the Meadowlands, and the Palisades.

A phratry of the Lenape, the Hackensack spoke the Unami dialect, one of the two major dialects of the Lenape, or Delaware, languages, which were part of the Algonquian language family. Unami meant the "people down river".

Other bands of Unami speakers in the area included the Raritan on Staten Island/Raritan Bay, the Acquackanonk on the Passaic River, the Tappan along the Palisades and Pascack Valley, and the Pompton people along the Passaic River and Saddle River tributaries. These groups, along with the Wappinger in the Hudson Valley, and Canarsee and Rockaway on Long Island, were sometimes collectively called the River Indians.

The Lenape engaged in agriculture and seasonally migrated, cultivating companion planting at their campsites to supplement foraging, hunting, fishing, trapping, and shellfishing. The terrain they inhabited was diverse: wide tidal flats and oyster beds, forested mountains, and level land that could be cultivated. The Hackensack would relocate their semi-permanent village every several years to allow the land to renew itself. It was usually sited between Tantaqua and the middle reaches of the Hackensack River. Their summer encampment and council fire was located at Gamoenpa, (the "big landing-place from the other side of the river"). At Hopoghan Hackingh (meaning "land of the tobacco pipe"), they collected soapstone from which to carve tobacco pipes.

The Hackensack identified themselves with the totem of the turtle ("Turtle Clan"). Those with the totem of the turtle were held in great esteem by Lenape groups, particularly as peacemakers. The society of the Hackensack (and all Lenape) was based on governance by consensus. A sachem, or sagamore, ("paramount chief"), though influential, was obliged to follow the decisions of the council made up of leaders among the tribe. The word caucus may come from the Algonquian caucauasu meaning "counselor".

In the 17th century, the Hackensack numbered about one thousand, of whom 300 were warriors. An important sachem of that time was Oratam (born circa 1576). He was likely also the sagamore of the Tappan, a distinct but closely related Lenape group. It has also been written that the Tappan and the Hackensack were one tribe, the evidence for this being the many land deeds signed by men who were sachems of both tribes at the same time.

== New Netherland and province of New Jersey ==
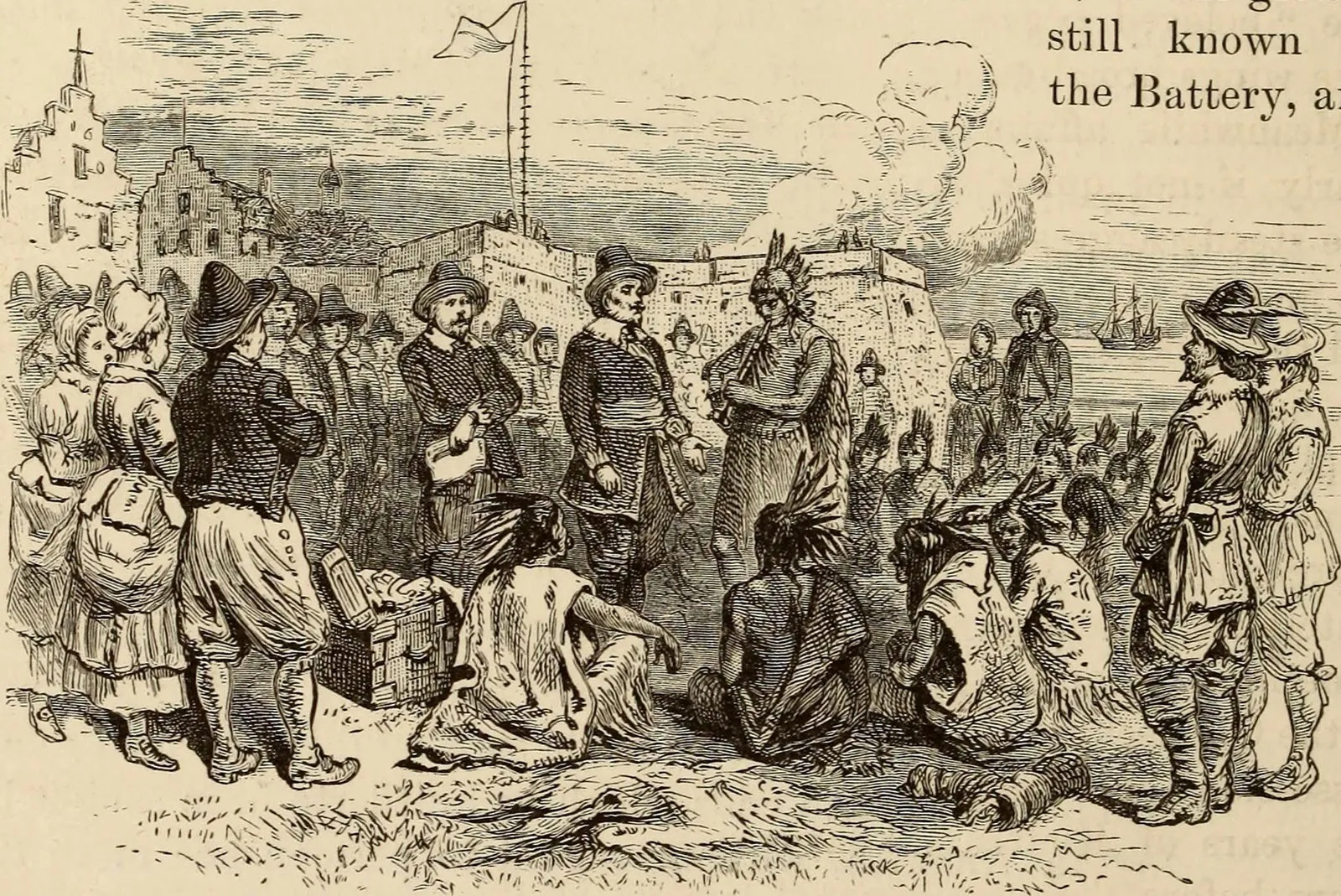

After Henry Hudson first explored the area, sailing up the river now named for him, anchoring at Weehawken Cove in September 1609, the Dutch claimed Hackensack lands as part of the colonial province of New Netherland. Living close to what became the province's capital, New Amsterdam, at the tip of Manhattan, the Hackensack had early and frequent contact with the New Netherlanders. They traded beaver, pelts, and sewant for manufactured goods, including firearms, gunpowder, and alcohol. The Hackensack also "sold" their land, which became sites for the Dutch settlements at Pavonia, Communipaw, Harsimus, Hoboken, Weehawken, Constable Hook, Achter Col, and Vriessendael.

In 1658, Peter Stuyvesant, the Director-General of New Netherland, negotiated the purchase of all the land from "the great rock above Wiehacken", west to Sikakes, and south to Konstapels Hoeck. The area became collectively known as Bergen with the founding of a village at Bergen Square in 1661. In 1666, the Hackensack sold the land that would become the city of Newark to Robert Treat.

In 1669, Oratam deeded a vast tract of land (2200 acres), between Overpeck Creek and the Hackensack River, to Sara Kiersted, who had mastered the Lenape language and acted as interpreter. He also brokered other land sales, and treaties, between the native and colonizing peoples, including those that ended Kieft's War and the Esopus Wars.

In a series of essays published in 1655, David Pietersen de Vries, who had established a homestead at Vriessendael, gave his observations of the Hackensack.

The British takeover of New Netherland, between 1663 and 1674, coincided with Oratam's death (he was said to have lived into his 90s). The government of the newly formed province of East Jersey quickly surveyed, patented, or deeded lands throughout Hackensack, Tappan, and Raritan territory. In most cases, the Lenape were compensated for sale of the land. Both the land at Newark Tract and Horseneck Tract were sold to English-speaking settlers by the Hackensack.

== Decline during European colonization ==
In 1600, the Lenape population may have numbered as many as 20,000. Several wars, at least 14 separate epidemics of new infectious diseases (yellow fever, smallpox, influenza, encephalitis lethargica, etc.), and disastrous over-harvesting of the animal populations reduced the Lenape population to around 4,000 total by 1700. The Lenape people, like all Native Americans, had no immunity to Eurasian diseases, which had been endemic in European cities for centuries after arriving from Asia; and they suffered high fatality rates from the diseases.

As the Lenape population declined and the European population increased, the history of the area was increasingly defined by the new European inhabitants. The Lenape Indian tribes played an increasingly secondary role.

By the mid-18th century, the English colonists referred to the Lenape people generally as the Delaware, in recognition of their major territory along that river and around the bay it feeds, both of which they named for Thomas West, 3rd Baron De La Warr, governor of the Jamestown Colony. Some Lenape had migrated west out of the area of English colonization.

In the eighteenth century, the Lenape were signatories to the Walking Purchase agreement in Pennsylvania, and Treaty of Easton. The British were trying to gain control of lands they had "acquired" from the French after the French and Indian War (1754–1763), and the Native Americans were trying to prevent further European encroachment into their territory. Today Lenape groups are dispersed around the United States.

== See also ==
- Elizabethtown Tract
- Esopus
- Great Trail
- Horseneck Tract
- Haverstraw Indians
- Lenape Trail
- Minisink Archeological Site
- Patroon
- Toponymy of Bergen, New Netherland
- Economy of the Haudenosaunee
