= Rumachenanck =

North eastern Native American group

Total population
- extinct as a tribe

Regions with significant populations
- formerly New Jersey and New York

Related ethnic groups
- other Lenape people

The Rumachenank were a Lenape people who inhabited the region radiating from the Palisades in New York and New Jersey at the time of European colonialization in the 17th century. Settlers to the provincial colony of New Netherland called them the Haverstroo meaning oat straw, which became Haverstraw in English, and still used to describe part of their territory.

Like the Tappan, whose territory overlapped, the Rumachenank were a seasonally migrational people, who farmed (companion planting), hunted, fished, and trapped. As all Lenape tribes, they were divided into clans, in this case Wolf, Turkey, and Turtle. They spoke the Munsee dialect of Lenape. They, as well as the Hackensack, Raritan, Wappinger, Canarsee, were collectively known as the River Indians. Those groups living in the adjoining highlands to the west and valley to north have become known as the Munsee, and sometimes the Esopus. The Haverstraws were the tribesmen who had the trouble with Verrazzano and the crew of the Half Moon while that vessel was anchored near Stony Point in 1609.

On 6 March 1660, a representative of the Rumachenank took part, with other local leaders, in a peace treaty with the settlers at New Amsterdam, capital of the province. Various land conveyances in 1666, 1671, 1683, and 1685 involved the Haverstraw, and indicate their territory as having been on disputed lands involved in the New York-New Jersey Line War, which was not finally settled until the 18th century.

In 1664 after the supremacy of the English, the Rumachenank were absorbed by the Tappans.

== See also ==
- Ramapough Mountain Indians

=== Neighboring Lenape peoples ===
- Esopus people
- Hackensack people
- Okehocking people
- Tappan tribe
