= Overpeck Creek =

Coordinates: 40°51′18″N 74°00′26″W

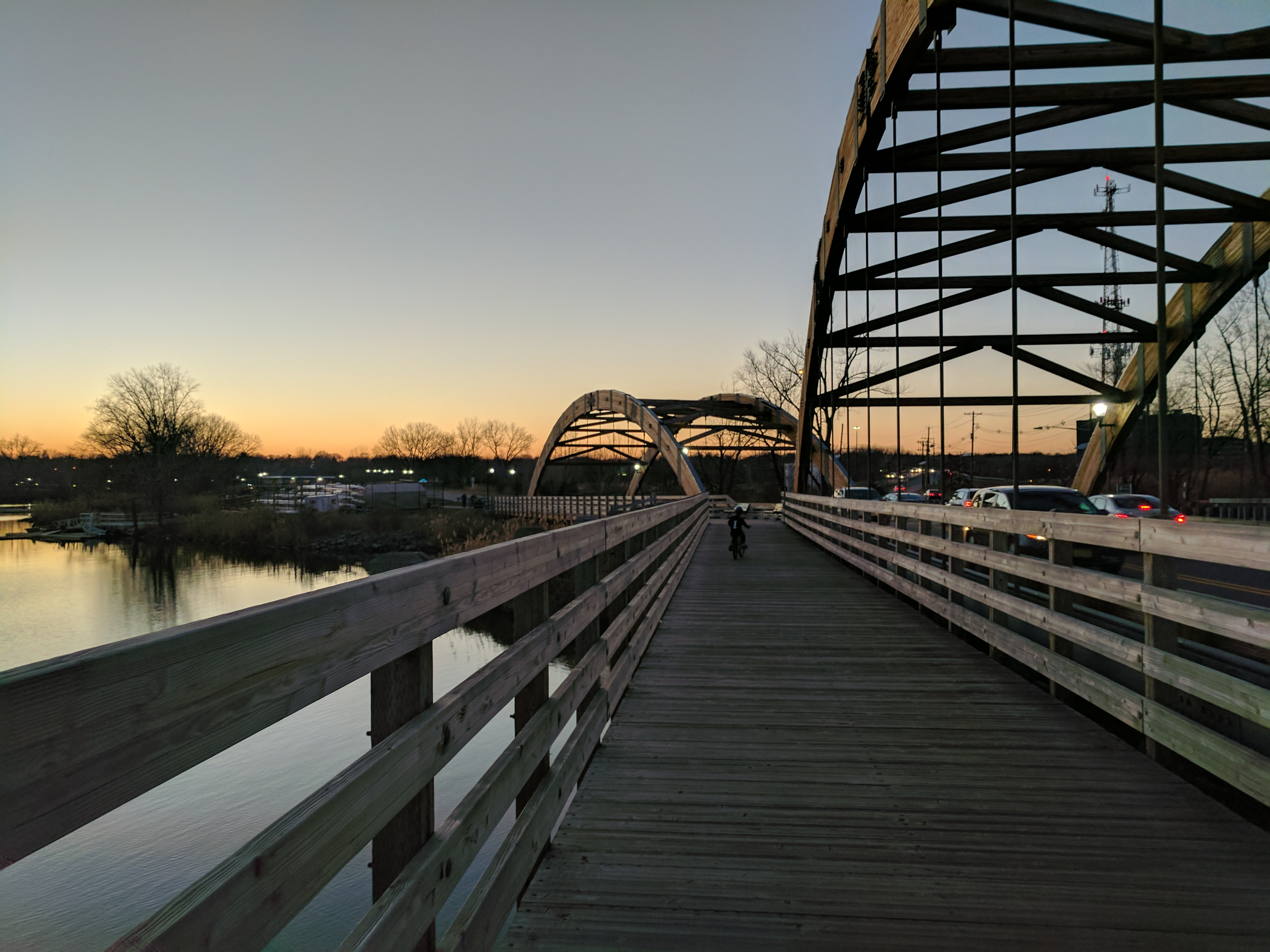
- Bridge crossing Overpeck Creek at Overpeck County Park

Location
- Country: United States
- State: New Jersey
- County: Bergen

Physical characteristics
- Source
  - location: Tenafly, New Jersey, United States
- Mouth: Hackensack River
  - location: Ridgefield Park and Little Ferry, Bergen County, New Jersey, United States
- Length: 8 mi (13 km)

Overpeck Creek is a tributary of the Hackensack River, approximately 8 miles (13 km) long, in Bergen County in northeastern New Jersey in the United States. The lower broad mouth of the creek is part of the extended tidal estuary of the lower Hackensack and of the adjacent wetland region known as the New Jersey Meadowlands.

The upper creek flows through suburban communities west of New York City. The creek rises in Tenafly, on the west side of the Palisades, approximately one mile (1.6 km) from the Hudson River. It flows south-southwest through Englewood, past Teaneck, Leonia, and Palisades Park, where it flows past the Overpeck County Park. It joins the Hackensack on the south side of Ridgefield Park and the east side of Little Ferry.

In colonial times, the creek was called "Tantaqua" and was the site of a Hackensack village. An attempted European settlement, Achter Col, in 1642 was aborted after Lenape retaliations for the Pavonia Massacre. Later 17th and 18th century settlements were collectively known as the English Neighborhood. The creek lay along the main land route west of the Hudson and provided a consistently difficult barrier for transportation in the area until the construction of modern roads and bridges in the 19th century. Development of the region was facilitated by the New Jersey Midland Railway, the West Shore Railroad, and the Erie Railroad's Northern Branch, the latter of which partially runs parallel to the creek. Restoration of rail service is the object of the Northern Branch Corridor Project and the Passaic–Bergen–Hudson Transit Project.

Although the creek is theoretically navigable, the mouth of the creek is blocked by the two bridges of the CSX River Line and NYS&W railroads. Federal law requires that these bridges be opened to water traffic on 24 hours' notice. The NYS&W bridge can still be opened manually, but the CSX bridge has been inoperable since being rebuilt in 2002, rendering the owning railroad liable to a fine of $25,000 per incident. Work to replace the bridge was funded in 2017 and work was scheduled to begin in 2018. The bridge collapsed under a train in August 2018.

Like the other tributaries of the Hackensack in the Meadowlands, the creek has suffered from severe pollution in the 20th century during the era of heavy industrialization. During the 1950s, tide gates were installed on the creek that largely cut off the tidal flow into the surrounding wetlands. The restoration of the surrounding wetlands has been an ongoing project of several state and private agencies.

== See also ==
- Little Ferry Yard
- Bergen Generating Station
- List of rivers of New Jersey
