= Tappan people =

Native tribe of the lower Hudson River

Tappan
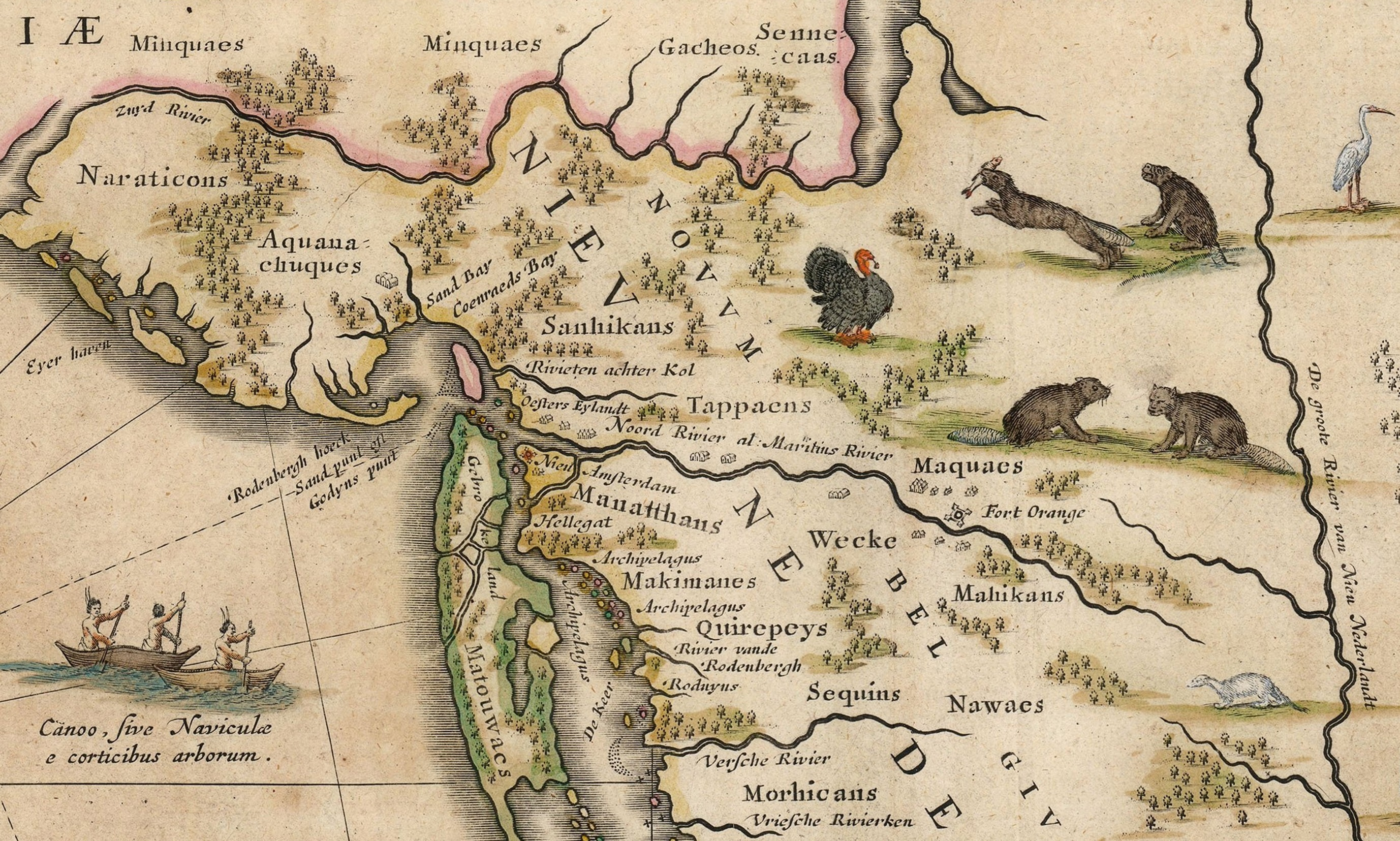
- Map c. 1634, Tappans lived primarily on the west side of the Hudson River in what has become Bergen County, New Jersey and Rockland County, New York

Regions with significant populations
- formerly New Jersey and New York

Related ethnic groups
- other Lenape people

The Tappan were a Lenape people who inhabited the region radiating from Hudson Palisades and New York – New Jersey Highlands at the time of European colonialization in the 17th century.

== Etymology ==
The exonym Tappan is likely a derivation of a word or phrase from the Algonquian language Lenape as used by settlers to New Netherland, who spelled it as Tappaen. It is not certain what the Tappan called themselves, but there are a variety of interpretations for the word. One suggestion is that it possibly comes from tuphanne meaning cold water.

Vriessendael, one of the first "bouweries", or homesteads, built in the territory was sometimes called Tappan. The Tappan are recalled throughout their former territory: Lake Tappan is a reservoir on the Hackensack River; the Tappan Zee, widening of the Hudson River and the bridge crossing it; Old Tappan in Bergen County; Tappan in Rockland County.

== History ==
The Tappan migrated seasonally and engaged in companion planting, hunting, fishing, and trapping. Like the other natives who circulated in the region and whose territory overlapped, the Hackensack, Acquackanonk and Rumachenanck (later called the Haverstraw). The Tappan were of the Turtle Clan and spoke the Unami dialect of Lenape. The Tappan and the Hackensack actually were but one tribe and members of it were called either by one name or another according to their dwelling place. They, as well as the Raritan, Wappinger, Manhattan (also known as "Manhattoe"), were collectively known as the River Indians. Those groups living in the adjoining highlands to the west and north have become known as the Munsee.

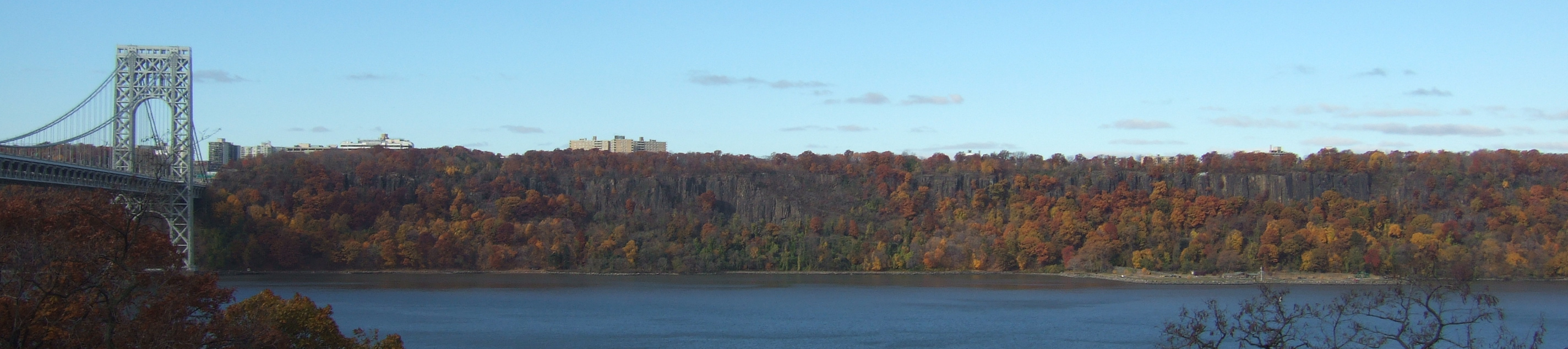
The Palisades, part of Tappan territory

Contact with the European settlers was at first as trading partners. It is from them that David de Vries purchased the land (1640) to build the homestead at Vriessendael (Edgewater) and, living among them, became an advocate of learning more about indigenous culture. It was an early Director of New Netherland, William Kieft, who attempted to exact tribute from them (but was ignored), and later allowed a number of them to be slaughtered after they had sought safety at Pavonia (1643), beginning a Kieft's War.

== See also ==
- Endonym and exonym
