= Bergen Neck =

Peninsula in northeastern New Jersey, United States

Coordinates: 40°42′N 74°06′W

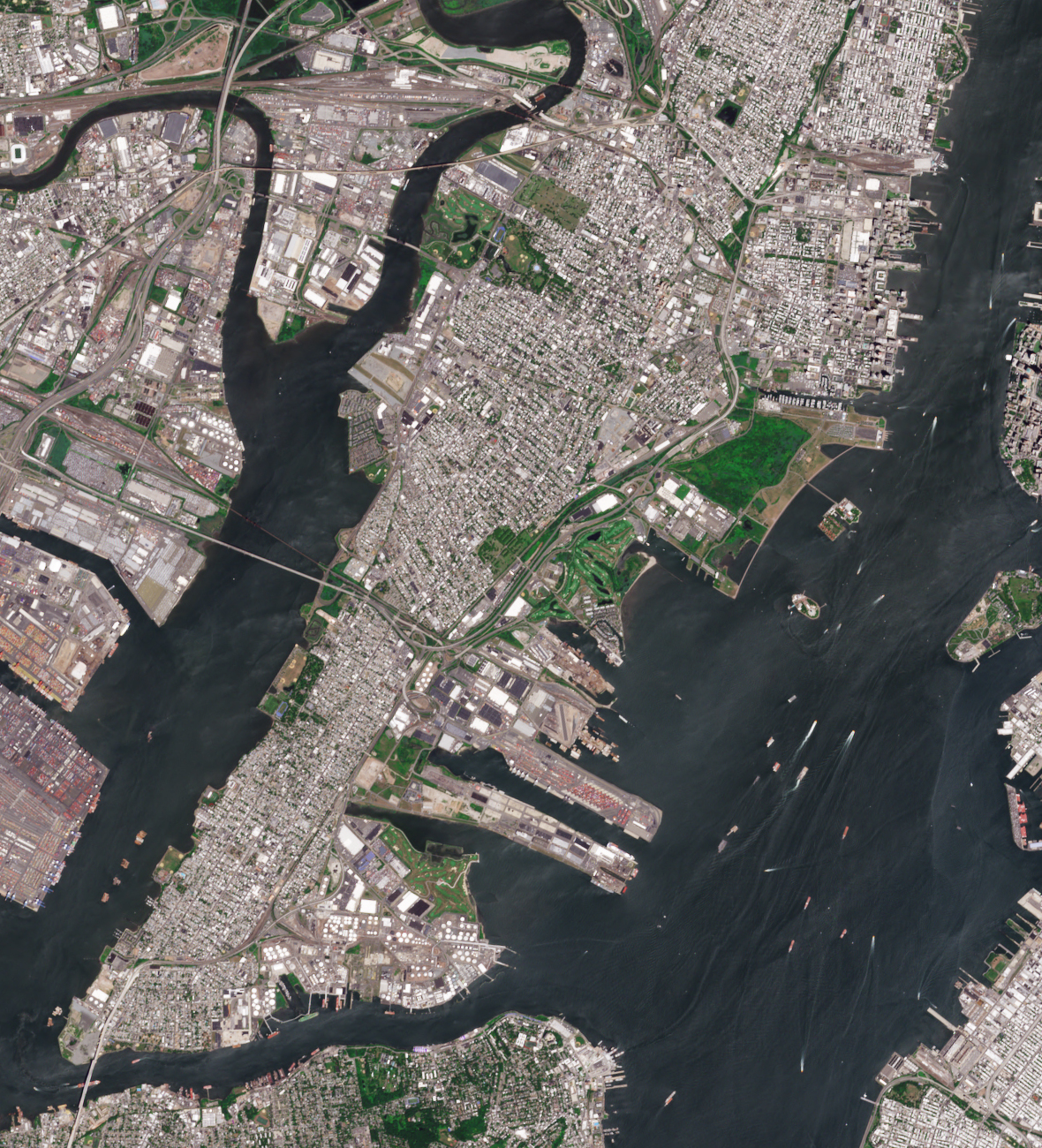
Bergen Neck lies to the west of the Upper New York Bay.

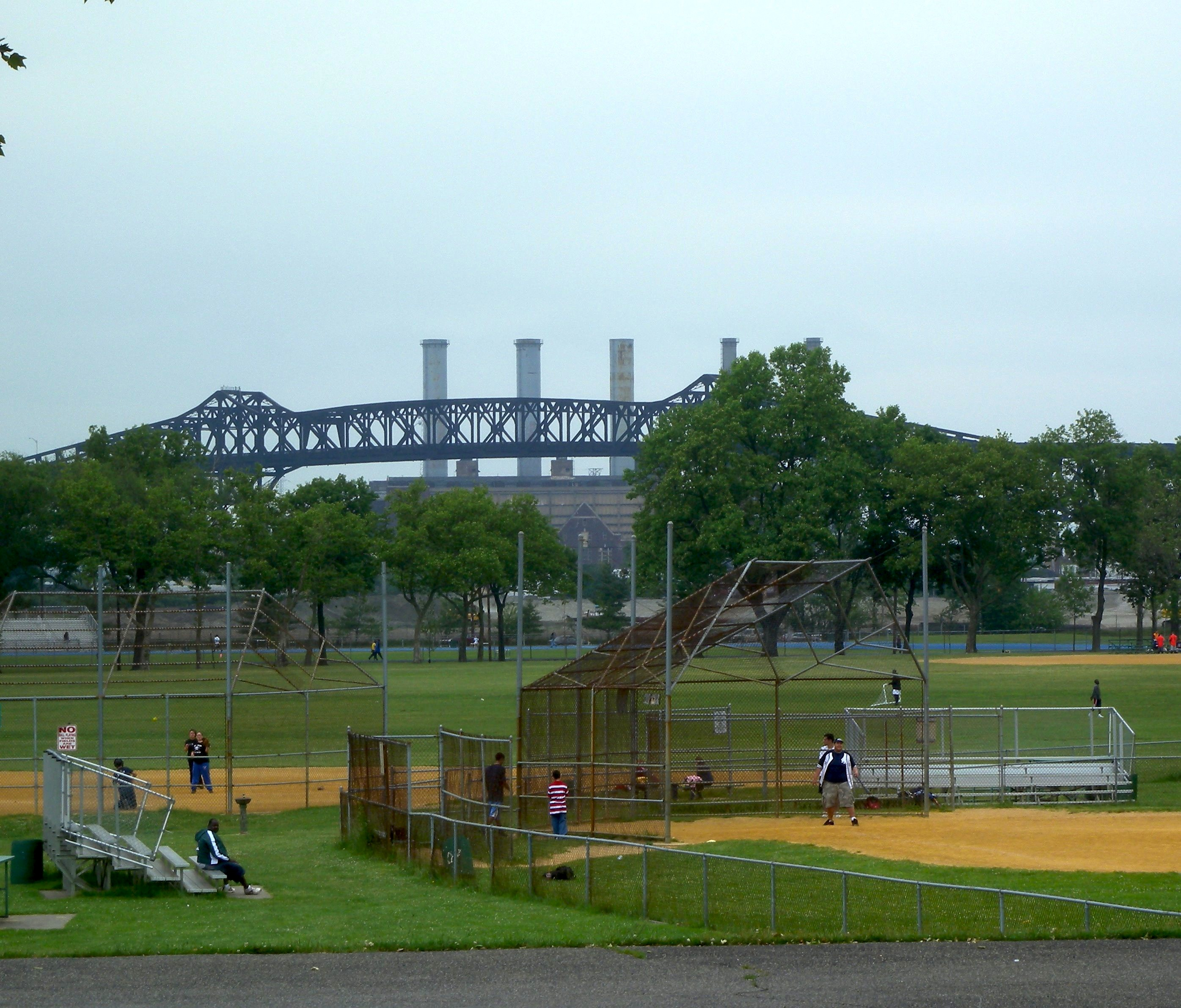
Lincoln Park, Jersey City

Bergen Neck is a peninsula in the United States, located between the Upper New York Bay and the Newark Bay in the Hudson County, New Jersey municipalities of Bayonne and Jersey City. Its southernmost tip, Bergen Point, is separated from Staten Island by the Kill van Kull, which is crossed by the Bayonne Bridge. It was likely first called so in the 17th century by the first Dutch and English speaking settlers to the region between the bays and northward along the Hudson River and Hackensack River. Though now part of Hudson County, the area was part of Bergen County from its creation in 1683 until Hudson County was created in 1840, and was part of Bergen Township, which lasted until 1862.

It was first named Oyster Island by the Dutch, who at first thought it was an island, and for a brief period after the British takeover of New Netherland in 1674 was called Old Hackensack Neck. During the American Revolution British maps showed it as Barren Neck. Bergen Neck is rarely used, occasionally replaced by the terms such as Bayonne Peninsula, Hudson Peninsula, South Hudson. It gave its name to a fort during the American Revolution, which was built in 1776, occupied by the British in 1777, and demolished in September 1782. (In British hands the fort was renamed for Oliver De Lancey, Sr. as Fort Delancey.) It still lends its name to First Reformed Dutch Church of Bergen Neck in Bayonne.

The waterfront of Bergen Neck varies greatly. The Central Railroad of New Jersey crossed the CRRNJ Newark Bay Bridge to its line to Communipaw Terminal, portions of which are now used by the Hudson Bergen Light Rail. The National Docks Secondary line is now used by Norfolk Southern to Port Jersey and other points. The emergence of the Hudson Palisades on Bergen Neck is called Bergen Hill, which is also traversed with rail lines.

During the 20th century the east side of the peninsula was home to heavy industry, rail and shipping facilities, and military installations, notably Standard Oil, Central Railroad of New Jersey, and the Military Ocean Terminal at Bayonne. Some areas, particularly Constable Hook and Port Jersey still function in that capacity. Other brownfields have been redeveloped for residential, commercial, and recreational use, such as Liberty State Park. The west, or Newark Bay side, in Bayonne has traditionally been more residential while in Jersey City, it has tended to be more mixed-use, combining residences, retail, municipal services, manufacturing, and recreation, such as Lincoln Park. Projects to provide public access to the water's edge are in progress with the creation of Hudson River Waterfront Walkway and the Hackensack RiverWalk.

Bounded to the north by the termini of the New Jersey Turnpike and St. Marginal Highway, Bergen Neck encompasses approximately 24.93 square miles (64.57 km^{2}). As of the most recent estimate, the peninsula is home to 448,570 people, yielding a population density of 17,993 people per square mile (6,947 people per km^{2}). Elevation on Bergen Neck ranges from just a few meters above mean sea level to a maximum of 80 m; however, a substantial portion of the land lies at roughly 30 m elevation.

== See also ==
- Bergen Hill
- New Barbadoes Neck
- Bergen, New Netherland
- Black Tom explosion
- List of bridges, tunnels, and cuts in Hudson County, New Jersey
- Kearny Point
