= Raritan people =

Pre-colonial inhabitants of northeastern New Jersey, US

Raritan
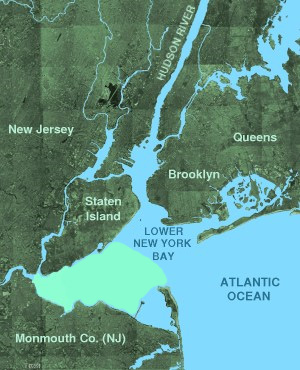
- General area of Raritan territory

Total population
- No longer distinct tribes

Regions with significant populations
- New Jersey

Languages
- Munsee language

Religion
- Indigenous religion

Related ethnic groups
- other Lenape tribes

The Raritan were two groups of Lenape people who lived around the lower Raritan River and the Raritan Bay, in what is now northeastern New Jersey, in the 16th century.

== Name ==
The name Raritan likely came from one of the Lenape languages (among the languages in the Algonquian language group), though there are a variety of interpretations as to its meaning. It may derive from Naraticong meaning "river beyond the island."

Raritan is a Dutch pronunciation of wawitan or rarachons, meaning "forked river" or "stream overflows".

The first group known as the Raritan was also known as the Sanhicans. A second group, known as the Wiechquaeskecks, Wisquaskecks, Roaton, Raritanghe, and Raritanoos settled the Raritan watershed area after the first departed.

== History ==
=== 17th century ===
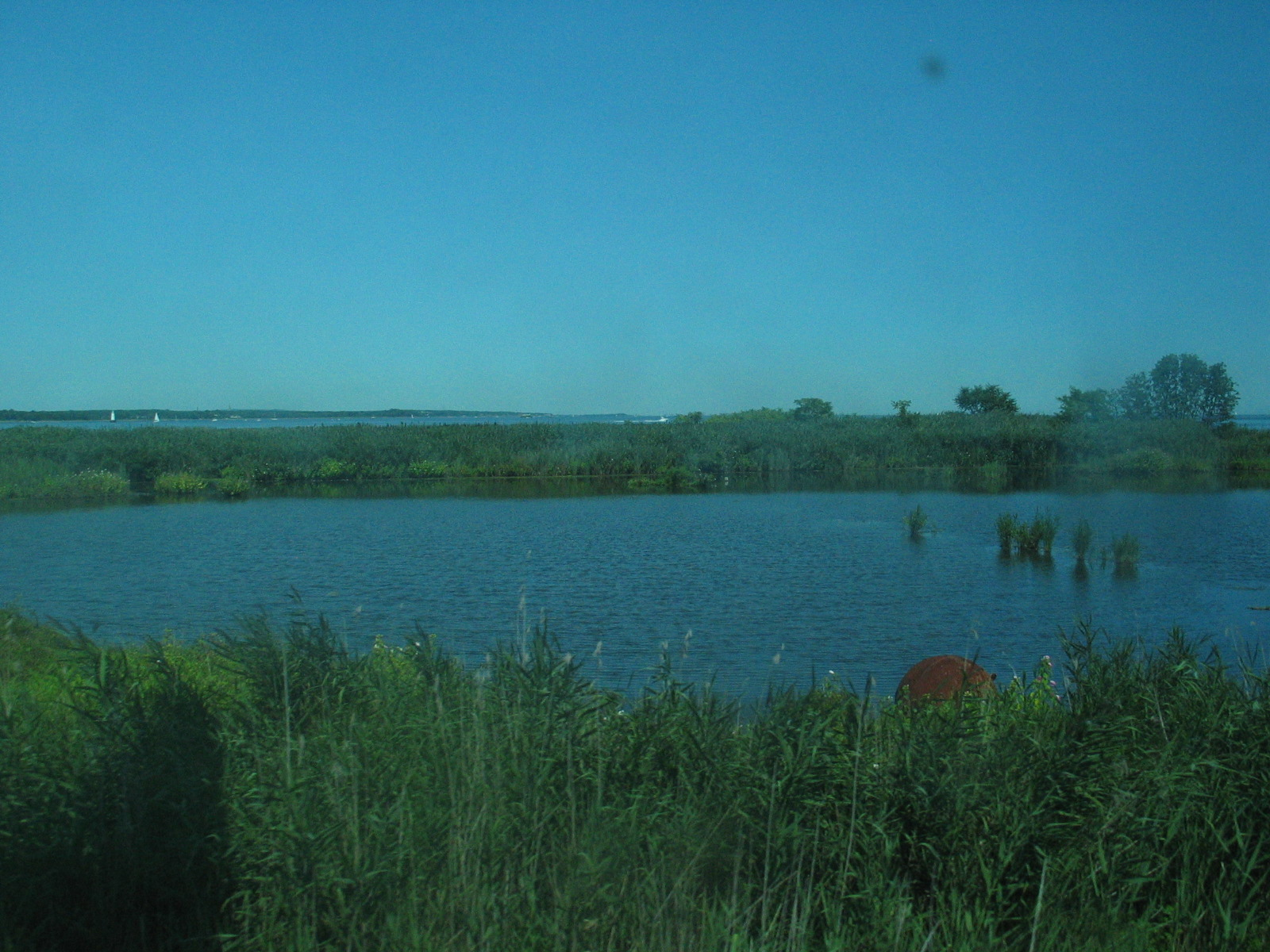
Marshes around the Raritan Bay

The original Raritans, the Sanhicans, lived along Raritan Bay's west shore until 1640s, when attacks from the Delaware River Indians and Dutch settlers drove them inland.

The Wisquaskecks had lived in what is now Westchester County, New York. After the Sanhicans migrated east, the Wisquaskecks moved into the area by 1649 and then also became known as the Raritans.

The Raritan had early contact with settlers in the colony of New Netherland. Dutch colonist David Pietersz. de Vries described the Raritans as "a nation of savages who live where a little stream [the Raritan River] runs up about five leagues behind Staten Island." He wrote that Cornelis van Tienhoven took more than one hundred men to the Wisquaskecks to address their theft of pigs and attempt theft of a yacht. Van Theihoven's group killed several of the Wisquaskecks and took their chief's brother as a hostage. Van Theihoven tortured the prisoner, and the Wisquaskecks responded to the attack by killing several Dutch settlers. William Kieft, governor of New Netherland, had planned the extermination campaign against them. The attack against the American Indians was a contributing event to the bands' allying in Kieft's War (1643–45) against the settlements of New Netherland.

In 1649, the Wisquaskecks held a peace conference with the Dutch settlers. Pennekeck, a leader from Newark Bay, "said the tribe called Raritanoos, formerly living at Wisquaskeck had no chief, therefore he spoke for them, who would also like to be our friends...." The Sanhicans unsuccessfully tried to contest Pennekeck.

=== 19th century ===
According to Encyclopedia of New Jersey Indians, the surviving Raritans sold the last of their lands and moved to the Brotherton Reservation in Burlington County, New Jersey. Their descendants are part of larger Lenape communities including the Stockbridge Munsee Community in Wisconsin, Delaware Tribe of Indians, Delaware Nation, Moravian of the Thames First Nation, and the Delaware First Nation of the Six Nations of the Grand River in Ontario.

== See also ==
- Burial Ridge
- Hackensack
- Wappinger
- Canarsee
- Navesink
- Raritan Bayshore
