= List of Hudson County, New Jersey placename etymologies =

This is a list of locales in Hudson County, New Jersey categorized by origin of their name.

== Municipalities ==
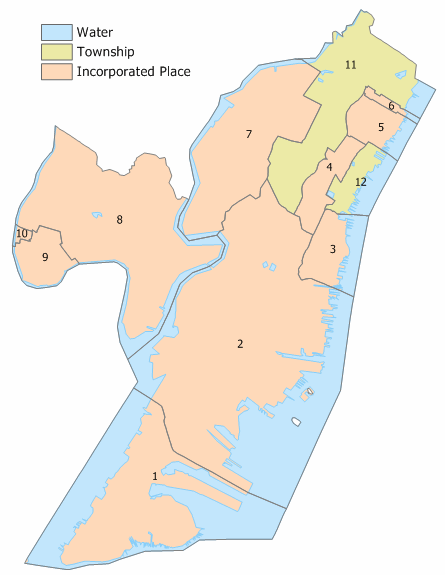

1. Bayonne (Bynne)
2. Jersey City (JC)
3. Hoboken (Hbkn)
4. Union City (UC)
5. West New York (WNY)
6. Guttenberg (Gtbg)
7. Secaucus (Sec)
8. Kearny (Kearny)
9. Harrison (Har'sn)
10. East Newark (EN)
11. North Bergen (NB)
12. Weehawken (Whkn)

== Lenape ==
The Lenape people who lived in the region spoke an Algonquian language from which the current names are derivative through Dutch and English.

| Name | Municipality | Origin | Comments | |
|---|---|---|---|---|
| Caven Point | JC | peninsula | through Dutch kewan (see:cay) | Road |
| Communipaw | JC | gamunk, on the other side of the river, and pe-auke, water-land, meaning big landing-place from the other side of the river. | Upper New York Bay before land reclamation at turn of the 20th century current: gamuck meaning other side of the water or otherside of the river or landing place at the side of a river | Terminal; Station; Junction; Cove; Avenue |
| Hackensack | JC, Sec; Whkn | place of stony ground or place of sharp ground | exonym for Hackensack (Native Americans) and the terrain around main village at Overpeck Creek near a ridgefield | River; Plank Road |
| Harsimus | JC | sea marsh or sea grass, possibly crow's marsh | salt marsh cove along the North River before landfilling in the 19th century current: ahas meaning crow | Cove |
| Hoboken | Hob | hoopookum or hupoken meaning smoking pipe, from Hopoghan Hackingh or place of stone for pipes | serpentinite rock found at the outcropping of Castle Point current: Hopoakan meaning pipe for smoking | Terminal; Cemetery |
| Lackawanna | | stream that forks | Delaware, Lackawanna and Western Railroad, originally the Lackawanna and Western Railroad, consolidated with the Erie Railroad to become the Erie Lackawanna Railway, travelled through the region of the Lackawanna River and across NJ to the waterfront | Hoboken Terminal |
| Manhattan | UC | island of many hills | From the word Manna-hata, as written in the 1609 logbook of Robert Juet, a first mate on Henry Hudson's yacht Halve Maen, while anchored at Weehawken Cove. A 1610 map depicts the name Manahata twice, on both the west and east sides of what became the Hudson River | |
| Pamrapo | JC; Bay | rock | Natural break in Bergen Hill where the east-west crossing of Morris Canal was later built and city line established. | Station; Avenue; Court |
| Passaic | | pahsaayeek, pasayak or pahsayèk meaning valley or water that flows through the valley | Current: Pachsa'jeek | |
| Secaucus | Sec | sukit meaning black and achgook meaning snake, hence black snakes. | Snake Hill | Road |
| Weehawken | Whkn | at the end of | emergence of Hudson Palisades at King's Bluff | Cove; Cemetery |

== Dutch ==
New Netherlanders established a factorij in 1617 at Communipaw, a patroonship in 1630 at Pavonia, and New Jersey's first independent gemeente, or municipality, in 1661 as Bergen.

| Name | Municipality | Origin | Comments | |
|---|---|---|---|---|
| Bergen | county-wide | bergen meaning hills or mountain ridge, alternatively from the verb to save, recover, keep safe | speaks to the terrain of Bergen Hill or the establishment of a stockaded village to which settlers could withdraw if needed | Square; Point; Bergenline, etc |
| Constable Hook | Bynne | Konstapel's Hoeck constable & hoek or hoeck meaning cape or peninsula. | land grant to Jacob Jacobsen Roy, chief gunner or constable in at Fort Amsterdam in New Amsterdam in 1646 | |
| Cromakill Creek | Sec, NB | kromme kill meaning crooked creek | border between Secaucus and North Bergen in Hackensack Meadowlands | |
| Paulus Hook | JC | variously Paulus Hoeck, Powles Hoek, Powles Hook hoek or hoeck | originally a tidal island, site of ferry and factorij operated by Micheal Paulus on behalf of the patroon | |
| Pavonia | JC, Bynne | latinized pauw meaning peacock | from surname of absentee patroon Michiel Reyniersz Pauw, as was common for educated men in Dutch Golden Age to take a Latin name | |
| Kill van Kull | Bynne | channel from the ridge from kille meaning water channel and col meaning mountain pass or ridge | Achter Kol described the terrain behind, or west, of the Hudson Palisades. Arthur Kill is an anglicisation of achter kill meaning back channel, which would speak to its location behind Staten Island. | |
| North River | In maritime usage, the Hudson River between Hudson County and Manhattan In relation to another of the great rivers in New Netherland, the Delaware or South River. Alternatively, the "North" River and "East" River were so named for the direction of travel they permitted once having entered the harbor. | | | Tunnels |
| Robbins Reef | Bynne | rob or robyn meaning seal | collections of seals would sometimes lay on the reef at low tide | |
| Suydam | JC | south dam | once part of the village of Communipaw | Street |

== Odonyms ==
Places bearing eponymous names.
(Streets with names of US presidents, more than half of whom are honored, are not included.)

| Place | Municipality | Origin of Name | Comments |
|---|---|---|---|
| Barrow Street | JC | Dr William Barrow | Prominent early 19th century resident of Van Vorst; Barrow Mansion |
| Bartholdi Avenue | JC | Frédéric Auguste Bartholdi | French sculptor and designer of the Statue of Liberty |
| Bedloe's Island | JC | Issac Bedloo | original name of Liberty Island |
| Bentley Avenue | JC | Peter Bentley, Sr. | Fifth Mayor of Jersey City |
| Black Tom | JC | Black Tom | resident of the island |
| Bloomfield Avenue | Hbkn | Joseph Bloomfield | Twice Governor of New Jersey |
| Bonn Place | Whkn | John H. Bonn | Founder of North Hudson County Railway |
| Boyle Plaza | JC | John F. Boyle | Director interstate commission which built Holland Tunnel |
| North Hudson -James J. Braddock Park | NB | James J. Braddock | World heavyweight champion |
| Burr Place | Whkn | Aaron Burr | Third Vice President of the United States |
| Bulls Ferry | NB; WNY | Bull family | 18th century ferry operators |
| Clinton Street | Hbkn | De Witt Clinton | |
| Colden Street | JC | Cadwallader D. Colden | Mayor of New York & President of the Morris Canal Company |
| Coles Street | JC | John B. Coles | New York State Senator (1799-1802) who initiated the plan for a public park in Jersey City to be named for Alexander Hamilton and whose land the park was built upon. |
| Colgate Street | JC | William Colgate | Colgate-Palmolive long a fixture in Paulus Hook |
| Cornelison Avenue | JC | John M. Cornelison | Director of the Hudson and Bergen Plank Road Company; Sixth Governor of New York. |
| Celia Cruz Plaza | UC | Celia Cruz | Singer and performer |
| Curries Woods | JC; Bynne | James Currie | Early settler and prominent citizen of Greenville |
| Danforth Avenue | JC | | HBLR station |
| Pietro di Donato Square | UC | Pietro di Donato | Italian-American writer |
| Dixon Mills | JC | Joseph Dixon | Inventor and manufacturer |
| Duer Place | Whkn | William Duer, son-in-law of Lord Stirling | |
| Ellis Island | JC | Samuel Ellis | Colonial merchant and one time owner of island |
| Fulton | Whkn; JC | Robert Fulton | Introduced world's first steamboat ferry service at Paulus Hook in 1812 |
| Gangemi Drive | JC | Thomas Gangemi | 35th Mayor of Jersey City |
| Garfield Avenue Station | JC | James A. Garfield | 20th President of the United States |
| Gates Avenue | JC | Horatio Gates | British soldier turned American general in Revolutionary War. |
| Gracie Lane | Whkn | Gracie family | |
| Gregory Avenue | Whkn | Dudley S. Gregory | 1st Mayor of Jersey City, Congressman 5th congressional district-NJ |
| Greene Street | JC | Nathanael Greene | Major general of the Continental Army in the American Revolutionary War. |
| J. Owen Grundy Park | JC | J. Owen Grundy | City historian and writer |
| Hamilton | Whkn; JC | Alexander Hamilton | Founding Father and first United States Secretary of the Treasury; Hamilton Plaza; Hamilton Park |
| Harrison | | William Henry Harrison | Ninth President of the United States |
| Holland Tunnel | JC | Clifford Milburn Holland | First chief engineer on the Hudson River Vehicular Tunnel project, who died before the completion of the project. |
| Hudson | used county-wide | Hudson River for Henry Hudson | Sea-captain and explorer of estuary and river in 1609 |
| Arthur Imperatore Drive | NB | Arthur Edward Imperatore, Sr. | Trucking magnate and founder of New York Waterway; Port Imperial |
| Journal Square | JC | Jersey Journal | Newspaper with headquarters located on square |
| Jeanette Street | UC | Joe Jeanette | African-American heavyweight boxer |
| Johnston | Bynne; JC | John Taylor Johnston | President of the Central Railroad of New Jersey; Port Johnston; Johnston Ave |
| Town of Kearny | Kearny | Philip Kearny | Civil War General |
| Kennedy Boulevard | Bynne, JC, North Hudson | John F. Kennedy | 35th President of the United States |
| King Avenue | Whkn | James Gore King | Congressman New Jersey's 5th congressional district |
| Lafayette Park | JC | Gilbert du Motier, marquis de La Fayette | French general who served in Continental Army |
| McAdoo Avenue | JC | William McAdoo | Congressman New Jersey's 7th congressional district and New York City Police Commissioner |
| Manischewitz Plaza | JC | Manischewitz | Company which built its factory at location in 1932 |
| Martin Luther King Drive | JC | Martin Luther King Jr. | Clergyman, activist, a leader in the Civil Rights Movement |
| Marin Boulevard | JC; Hbkn | Luis Muñoz Marín | Puerto Rican poet, journalist, and politician HBLR station |
| Mercer Street | JC | Hugh Mercer | Brigadier General in the Continental Army |
| Merseles Street | JC | Jacob M. Merseles | Founder the Bergen Point Plank Road Company |
| Monastery Place | UC | Monastery and Church of Saint Michael the Archangel | |
| Montgomery Street | JC | Richard Montgomery or James Montgomery Jr. | Brigadier General in the Continental Army; Director of Hudson and Bergen Plank Road Company |
| Morgan Street | JC | Daniel Morgan | Colonel in Continental Army |
| Nungessers | NB | Family Nungesser | Nungesser's Guttenberg Racetrack |
| Ogden Avenue | JC | Aaron Ogden | 5th Governor of New Jersey |
| Paulus Hook | JC | Michael Paulez | Agent of patroon Michiel Pauw and Dutch West India Company |
| Pavonia | JC; Bynne | Michiel Reyniersz Pauw | Patroon of first European settlement, latinized version of name meaning peacock PATH, HBLR stations Pavonia Court |
| Pershing | Whkn; JC | John J. Pershing | General of the Armies in World War I Pershing Road; Pershing Field |
| Peter Street | UC | William Peter | Founder Peter's Brewery |
| Prior Street | JC | John Prior | Owner of Prior's Mill in 18th century Jersey City |
| Pulaski Skyway | JC; Kearny | Kazimierz Pułaski | Polish General in Continental Army during American Revolutionary War. |
| Randolph Avenue | JC | Theodore Fitz Randolph | |
| Ristaino Drive | JC | John Ristaino | Candle and furniture-maker, champion speed-skater and Korean War Vet |
| Frank E. Rodgers Blvd. | Har'sn | Frank E. Rodgers | Mayor of Harrison for 48 years from 1947 to 1995 |
| Roosevelt | JC; UC | Franklin D. Roosevelt | 32nd President of the United States; Roosevelt Stadium (Jersey City); Roosevelt Stadium (Union City) |
| Schuyler Avenue | Kearny | Arent Schuyler | Early settler and member of the prominent Schuyler family, who developed mines in the region |
| Shippen Street | Whkn | William W. Shippen. | President Hoboken Land and Improvement Company |
| Sinatra Drive | Hbkn | Frank Sinatra | Actor, entertainer and famous son |
| Steuben Street | JC | Friedrich Wilhelm von Steuben | Prussian who served as inspector general of the Continental Army |
| Sterling Avenue | whkn | Lord Stirling | William Alexander, American general in Revolutionsry War |
| Tonnelle Avenue | JC; NB | John Tonnele | Early settler to Hudson City; Tonnelle Circle; HBLR station |
| Teurs Avenue | JC | Jane Teurs | Instrumental in foiling Benedict Arnold plot to sell West Point to British during the American Revolution |
| Van Vorst Park | JC | Van Vorst family including Cornelius Van Vorst | Early settlers to Pavonia, New Netherland; 12th Mayor of Jersey City; Van Vorst Street |
| Van Wagenen Avenue | JC | Van Wagenen family | Early settlers to Bergen, New Netherland; Van Wagenen House |
| Varick Street | JC | Richard Varick | Mayor of New York City and a founder of City of Jersey |
| Warren Street | JC | Joseph Warren | Sons of Liberty and Major General of Continental Army |
| Wayne Street | JC | Anthony Wayne | American Revolutionary War brigadier general |
| Westervelt | JC | Westervelt family including Jacob Aaron Westervelt | Early settlers to Bergen, New Netherland; Ship builder and Mayor of New York City |
| Wittpenn Bridge | JC, Kearny | H. Otto Wittpenn | 28th Mayor of Jersey City |
| Wright Street | JC | Edwin R. V. Wright | Congressman New Jersey's 5th congressional district and Mayor of Hudson City |
| Audrey Zapp Drive | JC | Audrey Zapp | Environmentalist influential in the development Liberty State Park |

== See also ==
- Toponymy of Bergen, New Netherland
- List of New Jersey county name etymologies
