= Van Vorst House =

Building in New Jersey, United States

Coordinates: 40.7467°N 74.0430°W

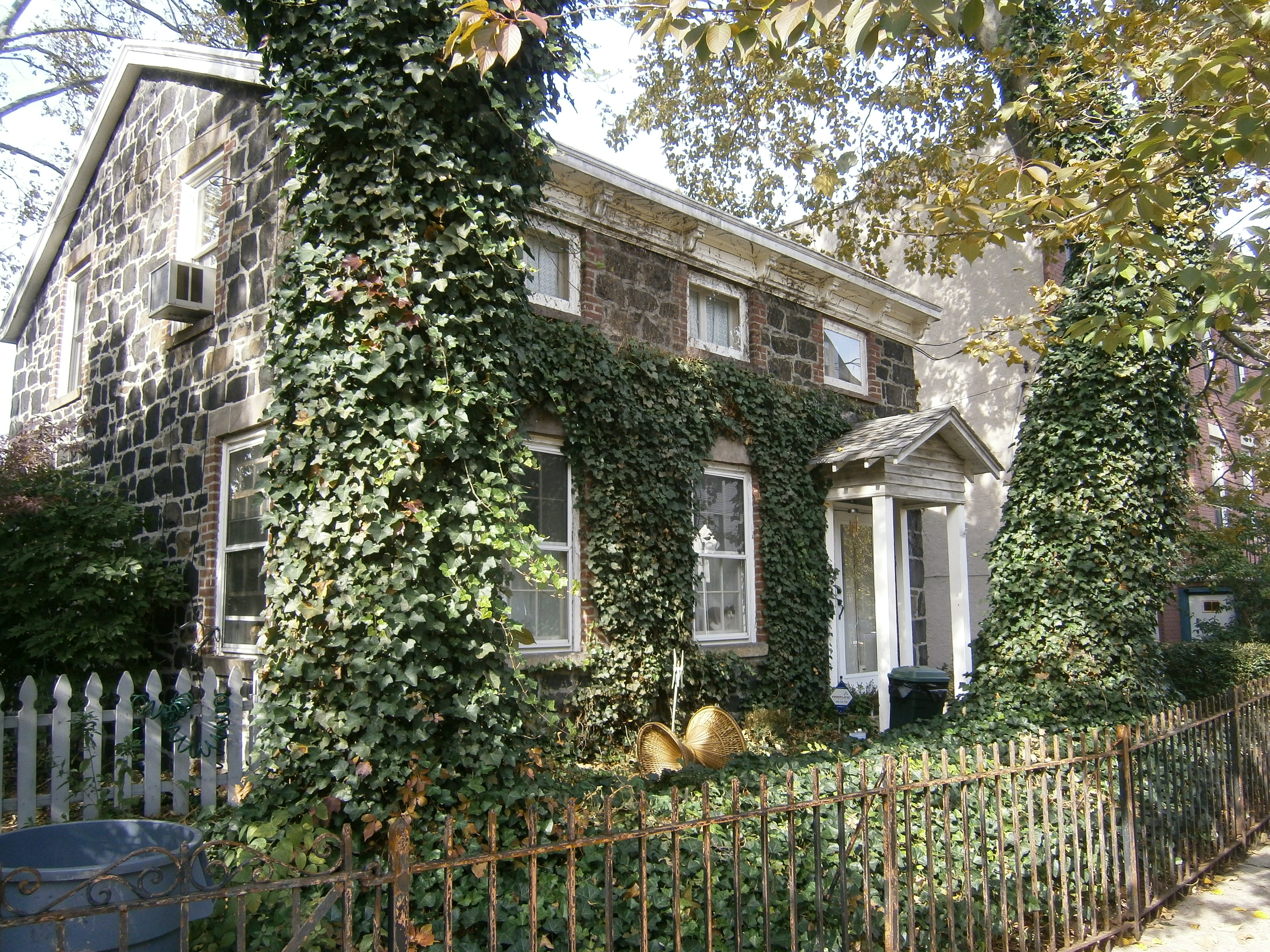

The Van Vorst House is a colonial-era residence in Jersey City, New Jersey, US, located at 531 Palisade Avenue in The Heights. The stone house was built c.1740–1742 by descendants of the first settlers in the region. It is arguably the oldest building in Jersey City.

The Van Vorsts were a prominent family who trace their North American roots to the third superintendent of the patroonship Pavonia, whose bowery was located at Harsimus, where his widow built the first stone house in the colony on the shores of the North River (Hudson River) in 1647. Their descendants played an important role in the development Jersey City, establishing the Township of Van Vorst (including the namesake Van Vorst Park) which was later incorporated into it. Cornelius Van Vorst acted as mayor of Jersey City from 1860 to 1862 and built the landmark Barrow Mansion.

== See also ==
- Newkirk House
- Van Wagenen House
- List of the oldest buildings in New Jersey
