= Van Vorst Park =

Populated place in Hudson County, New Jersey, US

- Van Vorst Park Historic District (Boundary Increase)
- U.S. National Register of Historic Places
- U.S. Historic district
- New Jersey Register of Historic Places
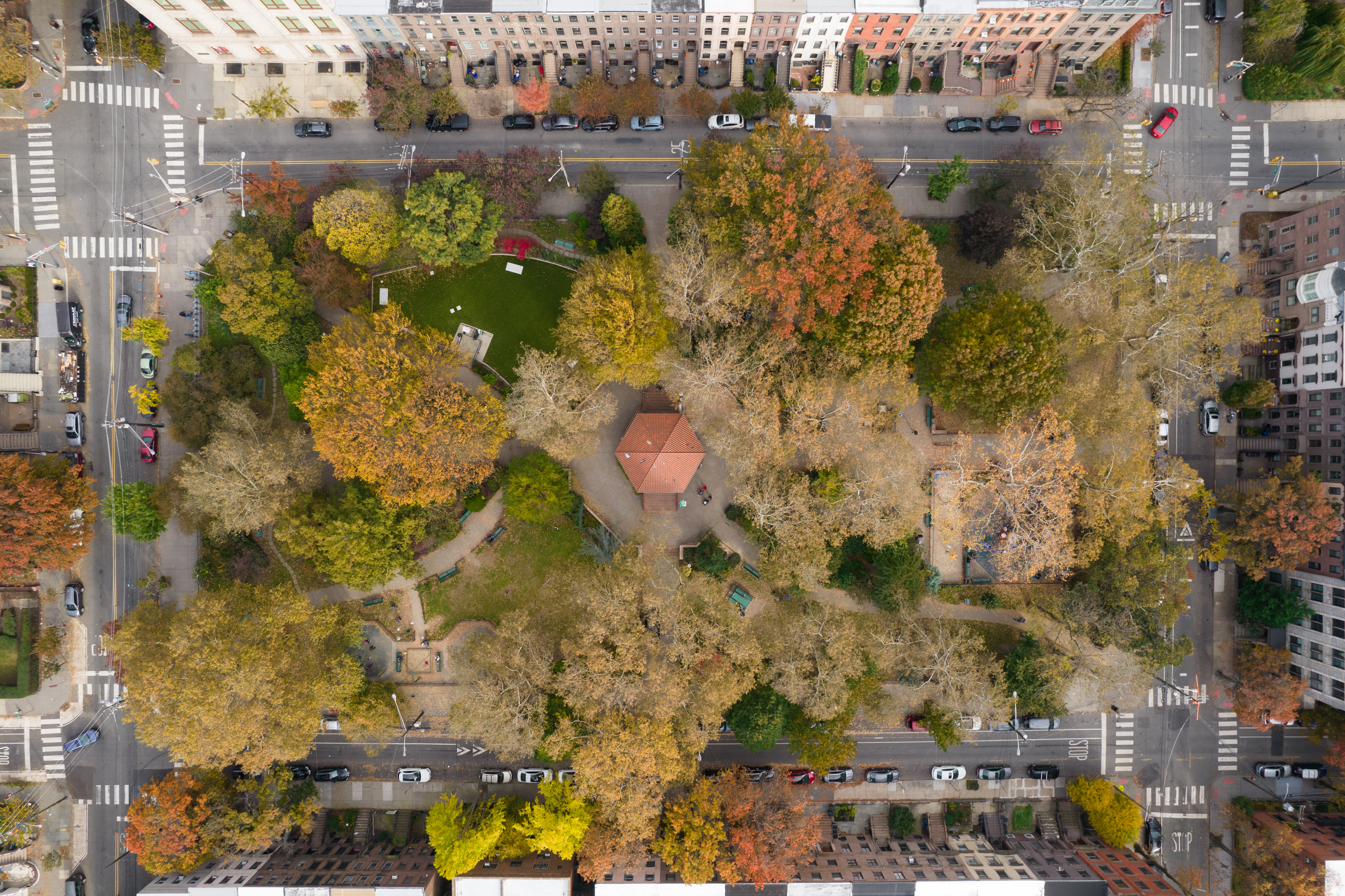

- Location within Hudson County, New Jersey Location within New Jersey Location within the United States
- Location: Roughly bounded by Mercer, Wayne, Montgomery, Grove, Bright, Varick and Monmouth Streets, Jersey City, New Jersey
- Coordinates: 40°43′7″N 74°2′53″W
- Area: 7.7 acres (3.1 ha)
- Architectural style: Late 19th And 20th Century Revivals
- NRHP reference No.: 84000084
- NJRHP No.: 1540

Significant dates
- Added to NRHP: October 11, 1984
- Designated NJRHP: August 2, 1978

Van Vorst Park is a neighborhood in the Historic Downtown of Jersey City, Hudson County, New Jersey, centered on a park sharing the same name. The neighborhood is located west of Paulus Hook and Marin Boulevard, north of Grand Street, east of the Turnpike Extension, and south of The Village and Christopher Columbus Drive. Much of it is included in the Van Vorst Park Historical District.

The park was a centerpiece of Van Vorst Township, a township that existed in Hudson County from 1841 to 1851. Van Vorst was incorporated as a township by an Act of the New Jersey Legislature on April 12, 1841, from portions of Bergen Township. On March 18, 1851, Van Vorst Township was annexed by Jersey City.

The name Van Vorst comes from a prominent family in the area, the first of which arrived in the 1630s as superintendent of the patroonship Pavonia, the earliest European settlement on the west bank of the Hudson River in the province of New Netherland. His homestead at Harsimus, plus others at Communipaw, Paulus Hook, Minakwa, Pamrapo were later incorporated into Bergen. His namesake and eighth generation descendant, Cornelius Van Vorst, was the twelfth Mayor of Jersey City serving from 1860 to 1862.

Like Harsimus Cove and Hamilton Park to the north and Bergen-Lafayette to the southwest, the neighborhood contains nineteenth century rowhouses and brownstones. It is home to the Jersey City Free Public Library, James J. Ferris High School (named for the Jersey City citizen who laid the foundation of the Hudson and Manhattan Railroad Powerhouse with his firm Stillman, Delehanty and Ferris), and Old Colony Shopping Plaza. Landmarks include Barrow Mansion and Dixon Mills.

The Grove Street PATH station is located nearby to the north, and so is the Jersey Avenue (HBLR station) to the south.

== Park ==
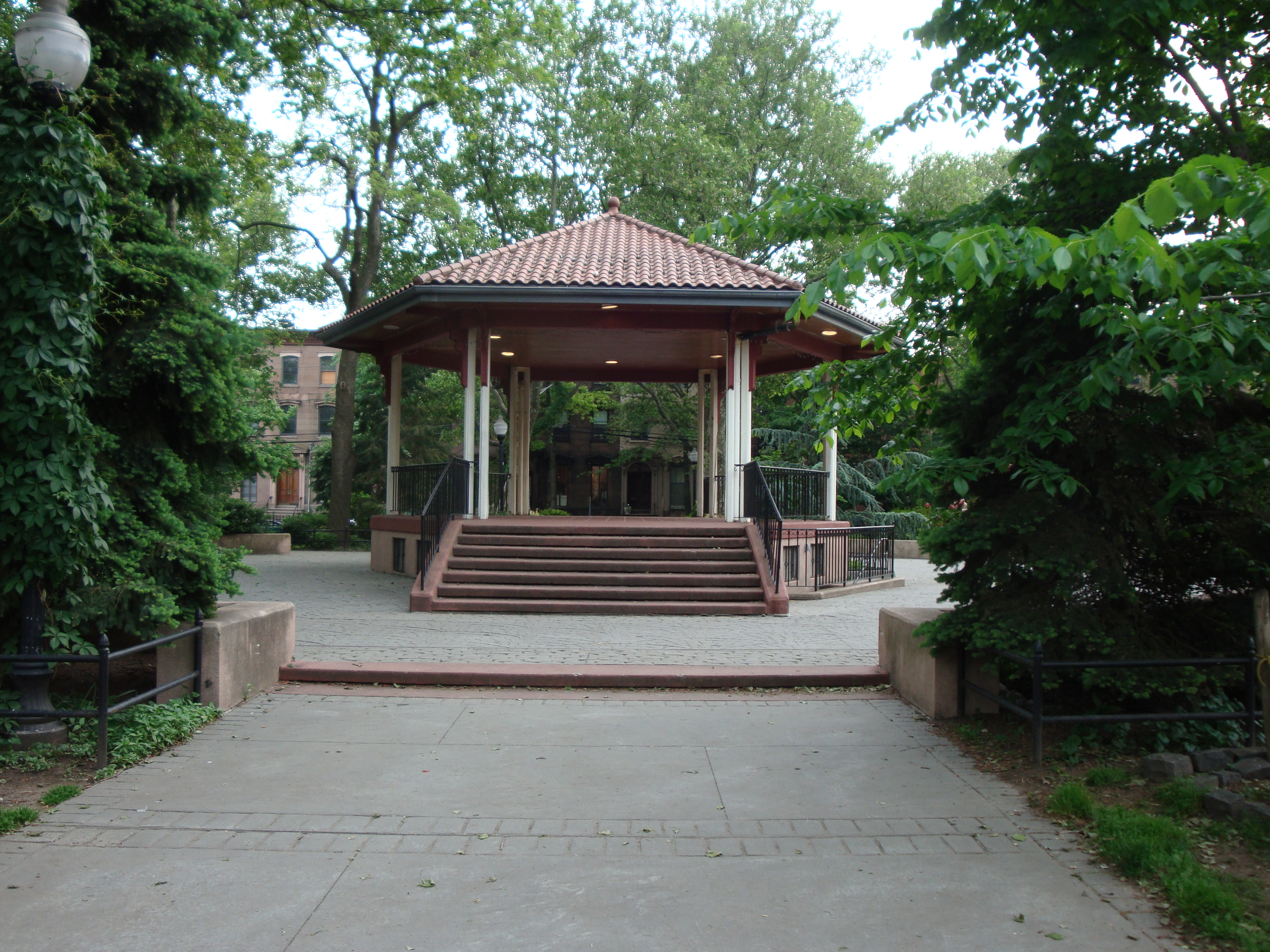
Gazebo in Van Vorst Park

Van Vorst Park is a two-acre city park bounded by Barrow Street to the east, Montgomery Street to the north, Jersey Avenue to the west, and York Street to the south. The park was renovated in 1999 at a cost of $2 million, with money raised by the Friends of Van Vorst Park.

== See also ==
- List of neighborhoods in Jersey City, New Jersey
- List of Registered Historic Places in Hudson County, New Jersey
- Pavonia, New Netherland
- Odonyms in Hudson County, New Jersey
- Grace Church Van Vorst

== Images ==
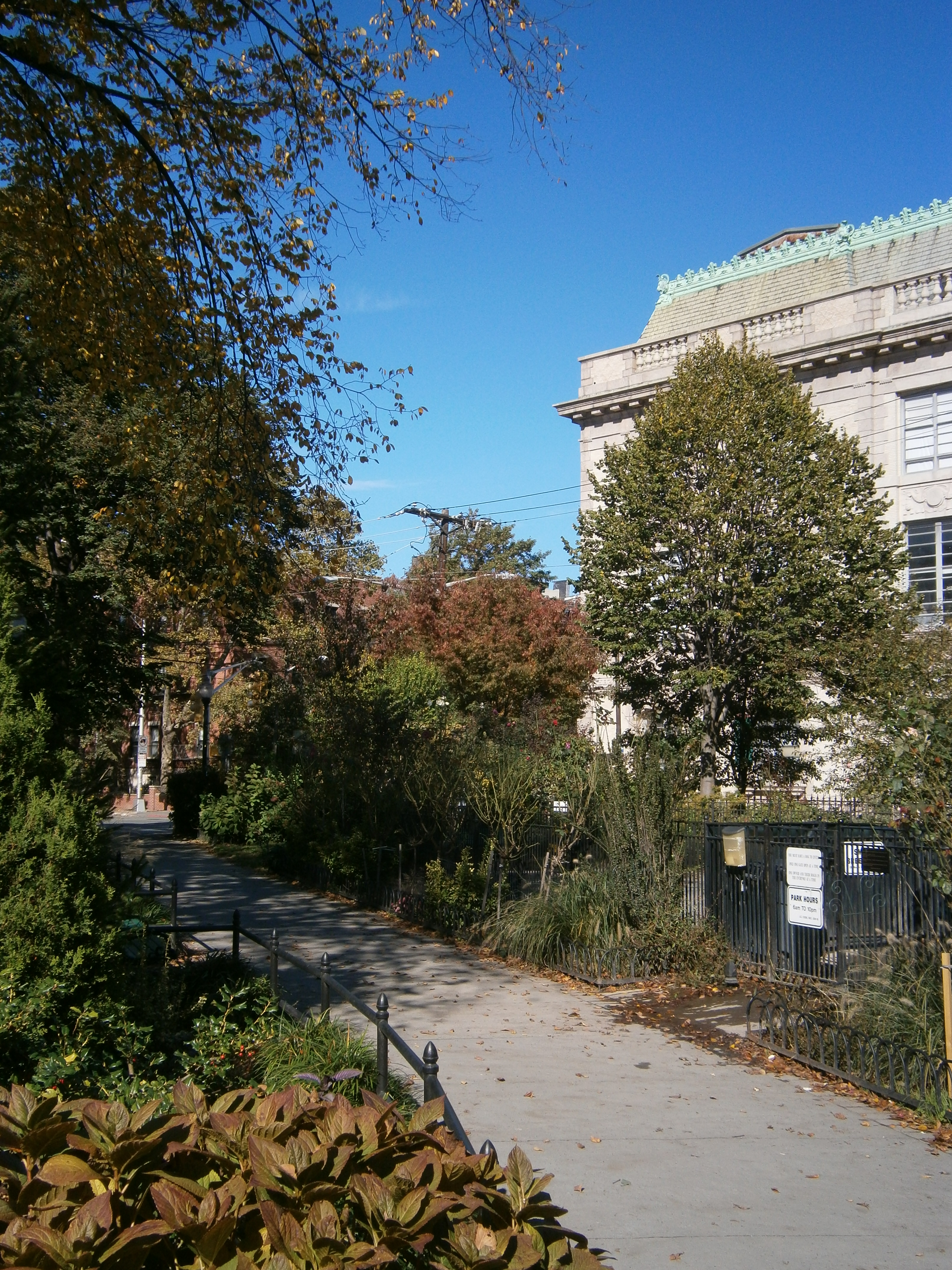
View northeast to JC Main Library

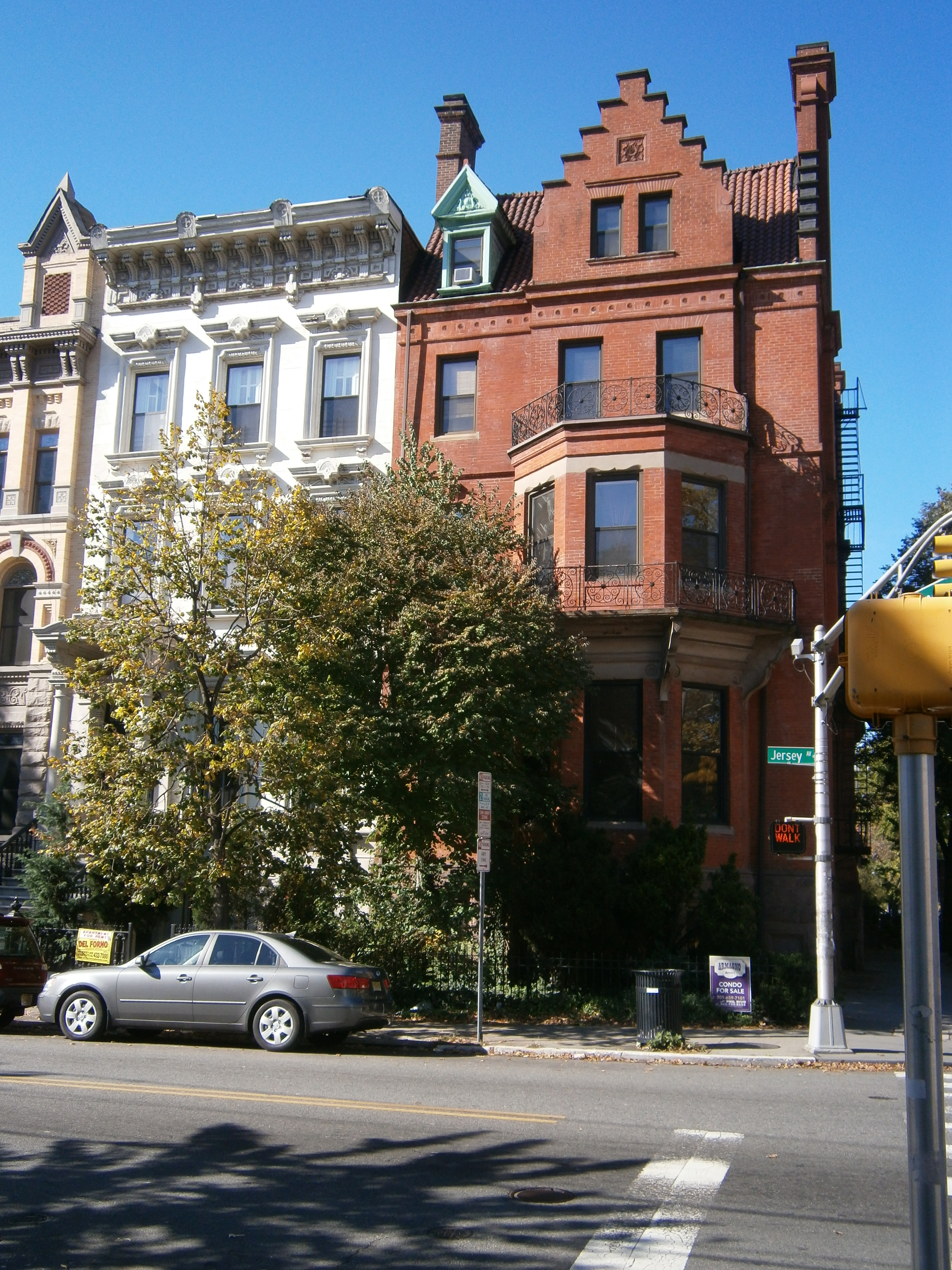
Heppenheimer Mansion at Montgomery and Jersey

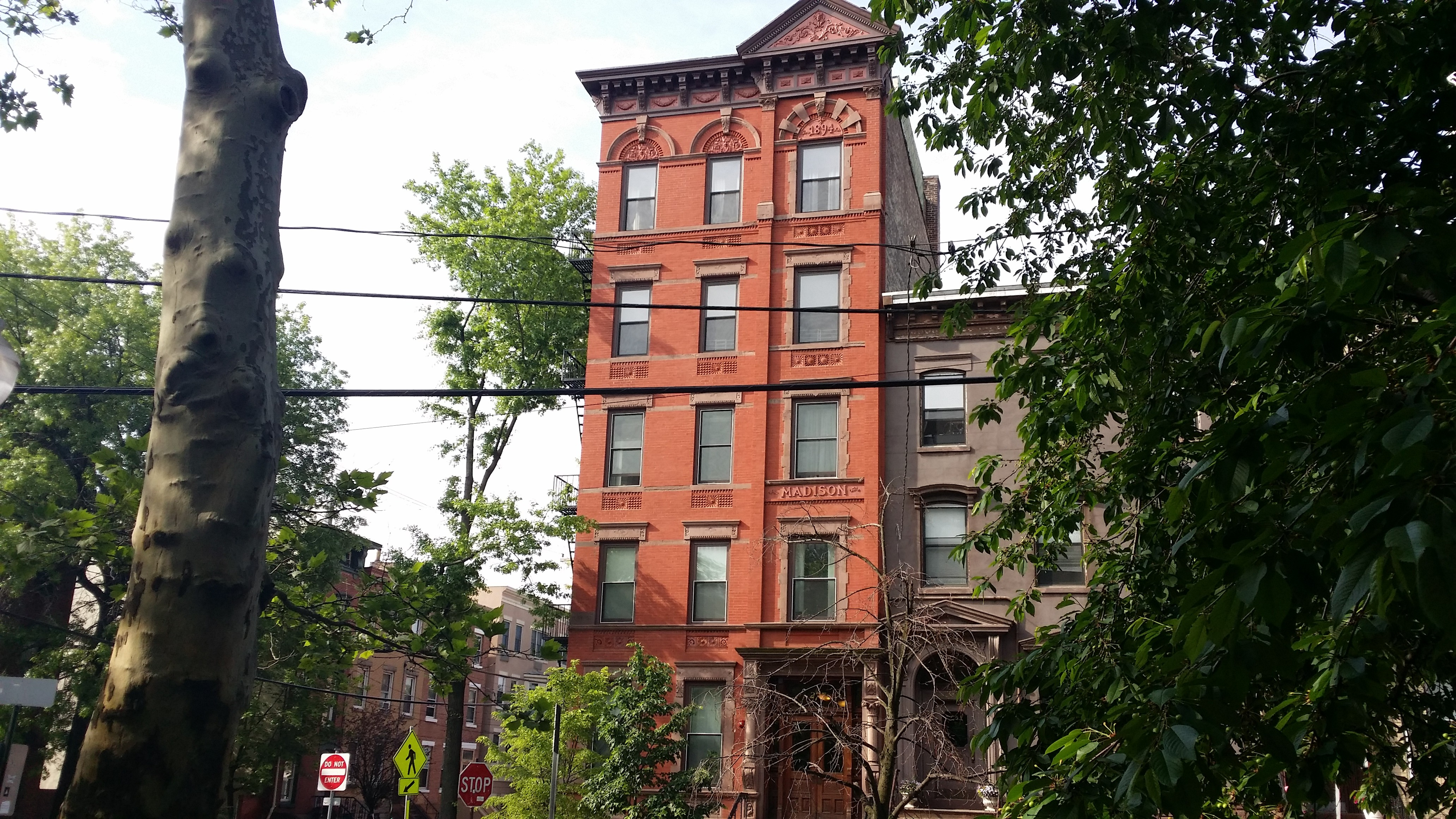
Madison on the Van Vorst Park at York and Barrow

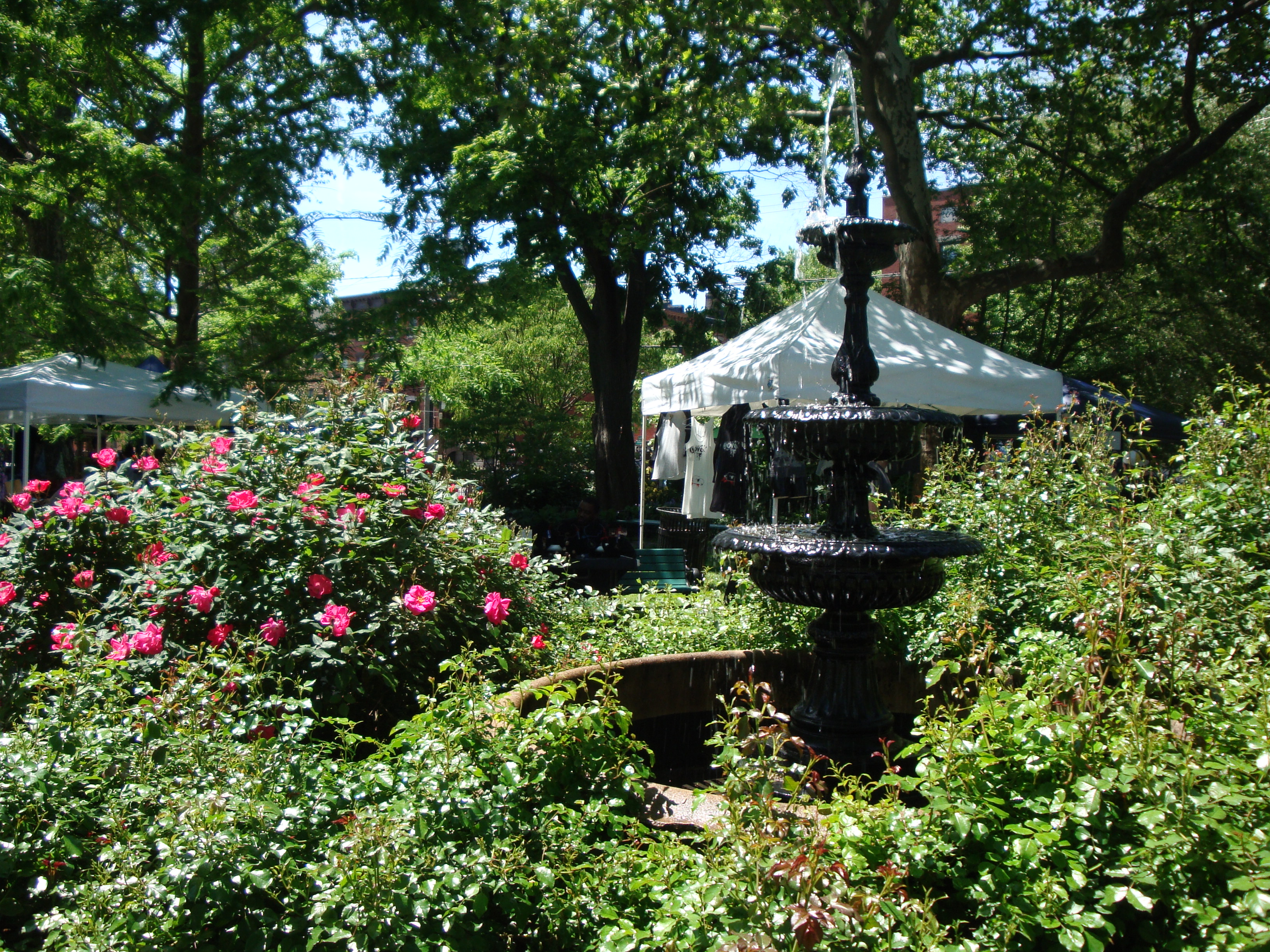
Water fountain in Van Vorst Park

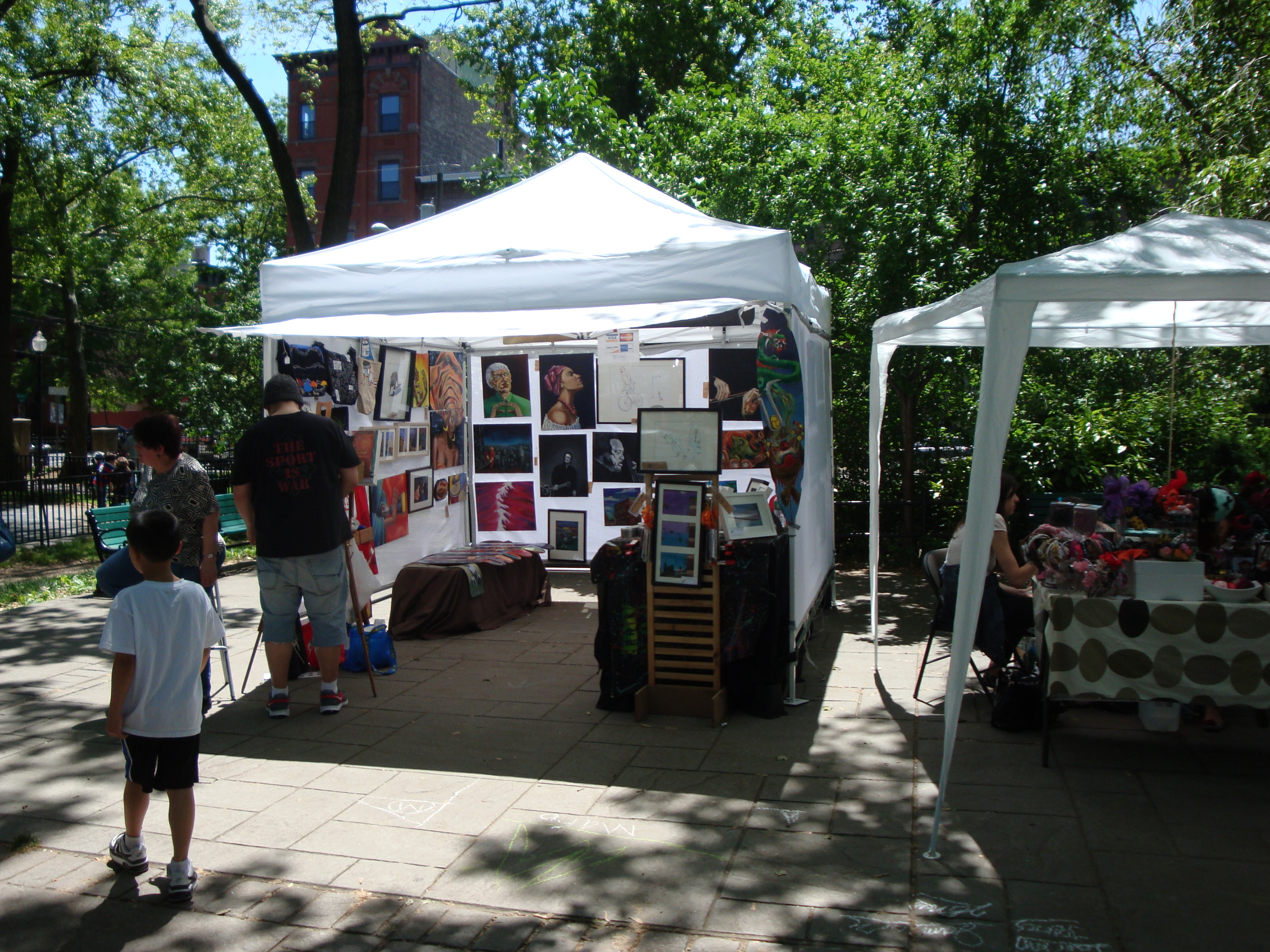
Vendors at Crafts Fair at Van Vorst Park

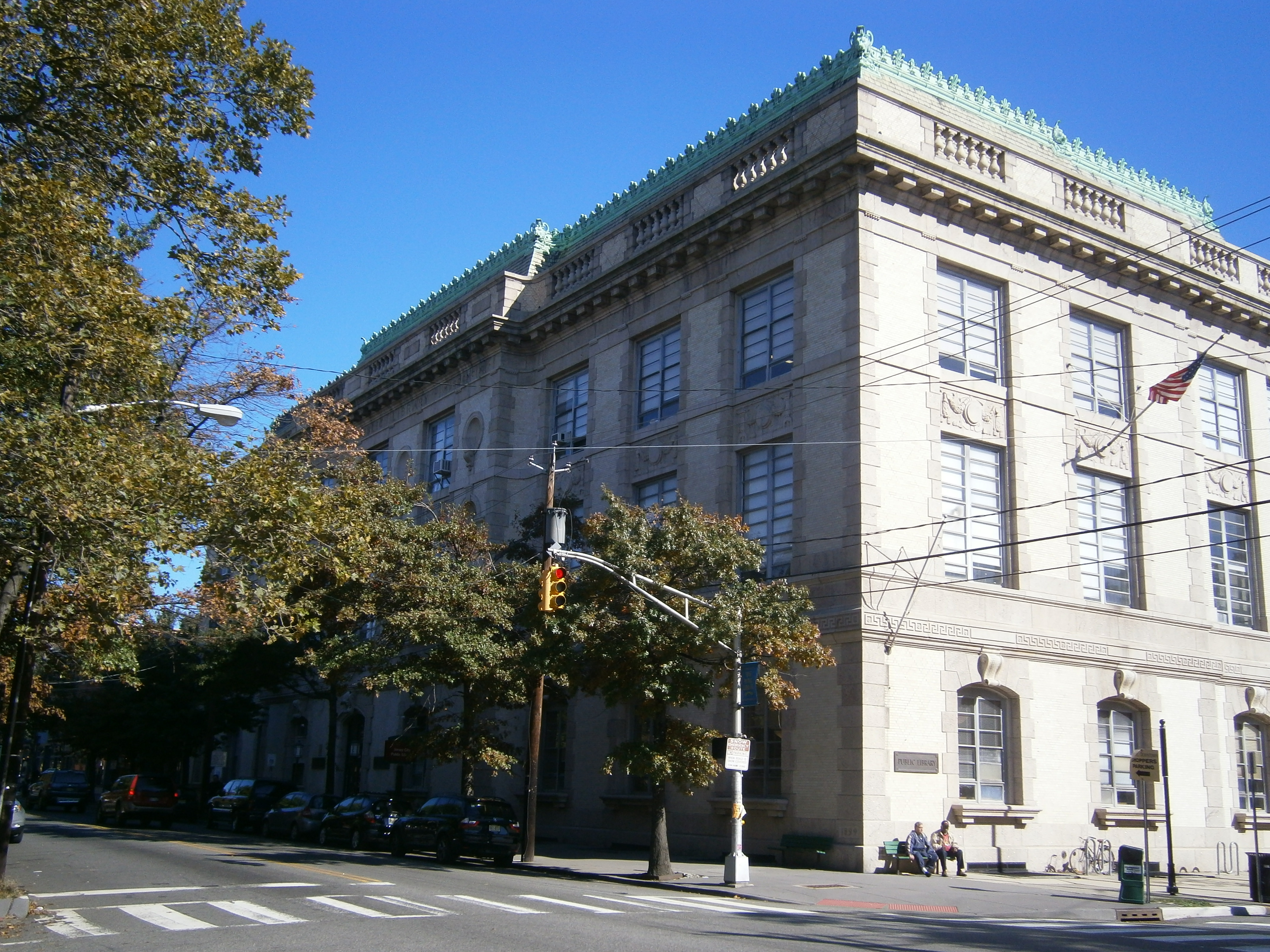
Jersey City Main Library
