= Bergen, New Netherland =

Origin of the New Jersey settlement

Bergen was a part of the 17th century province of New Netherland, in the area in northeastern New Jersey along the Hudson and Hackensack Rivers that would become contemporary Hudson and Bergen Counties. Though it only officially existed as an independent municipality from 1661, with the founding of a village at Bergen Square, Bergen began as a factory at Communipaw circa 1615 and was first settled in 1630 as Pavonia. These early settlements were along the banks of the North River (Hudson River) across from New Amsterdam, under whose jurisdiction they fell.

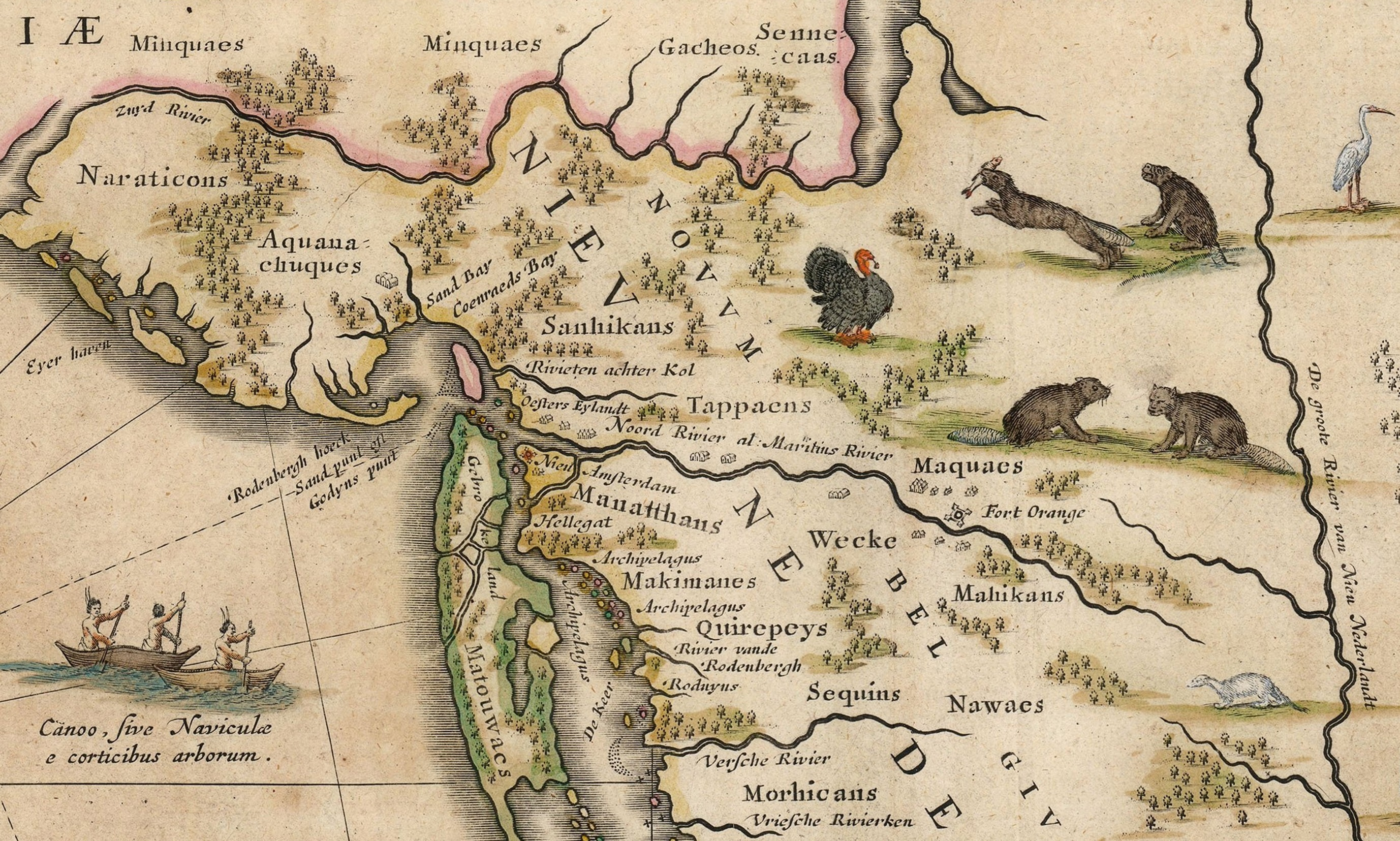
Map c.1634, Early names for Bergen were Oesters Eylandt (Oyster Island) and Achter Kol. The three structures likely represented Communipaw, Paulus Hook, and Harsimus.

== Halve Maen ==
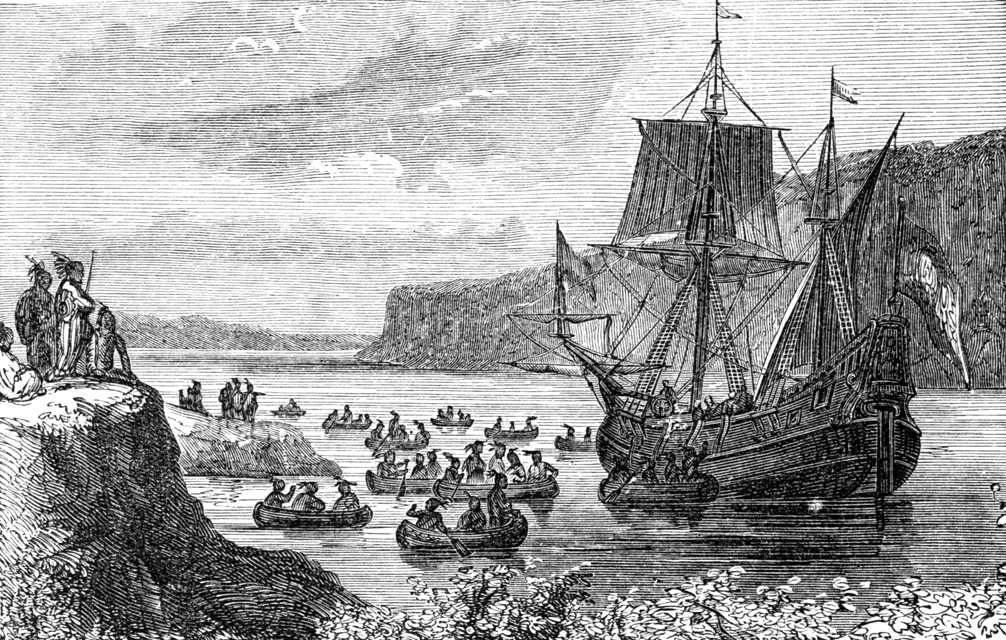
Halve Maen on the Hudson

Explored to The Narrows by Giovanni da Verrazzano, sailing on a French expedition in 1524, the area was visited by Spanish and English seafarers during the next century. It was again visited in 1609 by the Englishman Henry Hudson, who had been commissioned by the Dutch East India Company to find a navigable passage to Asia. During this journey his ship, the Halve Maen (Half Moon), laid anchor at Sandy Hook, Harsimus Cove, and Weehawken Cove, and other places along the river which now bears his name.

At the time of his exploration the shoreline was considerably different from today, consisting of huge tidal marshes and oyster beds. Several other expeditions to the coast of North America were made between 1610 and 1614; surveys and charts from them were incorporated in a map made by Adriaen Block which named New Netherland for the first time.

== Lenape ==
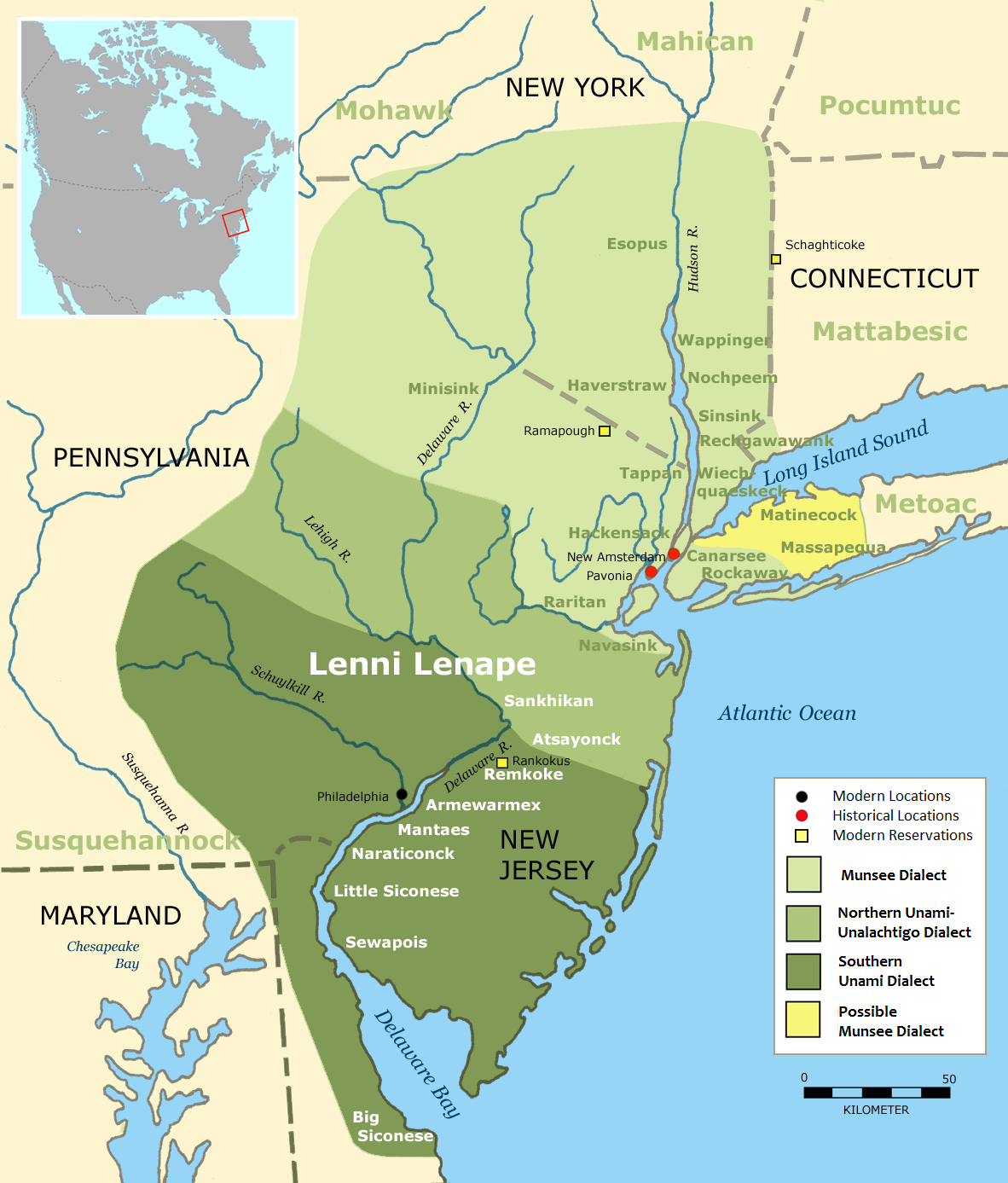

At the time the existing population were bands of seasonally migrational Algonquian people, the Lenape. The area that would become Bergen was the territory of Unami, or Turtle Clan, called the Hackensack Indians and the Tappan. While the Hackensack tended to camp on the tidal lands (Upper New York Bay and Meadowlands), the Tappan moved in the highlands (North Hudson to Palisades Interstate Park). Other closely related peoples circulated in the region: the Acquackanonk, the Manhattan, the Raritan, the Haverstraw, the Rockaway, and the Wecquaesgeek. Some were later called Delaware Indians (after Thomas West, 3rd Baron De La Warr).

Their larger communities were palisaded villages where they practiced companion planting (of the three sisters) to supplement foraging, hunting, and fishing. Shellfishing in the vast oyster beds spread throughout the entire estuary was essential to their diet. The trapping of beaver and rodents for pelts played a crucial role in their interaction with the Swannukens or Salt Water People, who procured the land from them through "purchases" that were misconstrued by both parties. A basic misconception was that while Europeans thought they were buying land in perpetuity, the Lenape believed they were entering into defense alliances with farming, hunting, and fishing rights. The Tappan and Hackensack had early and frequent contact with the settlers, and their sagamore, Oratam, negotiated many agreements and treaties with them.

== Pavonia ==
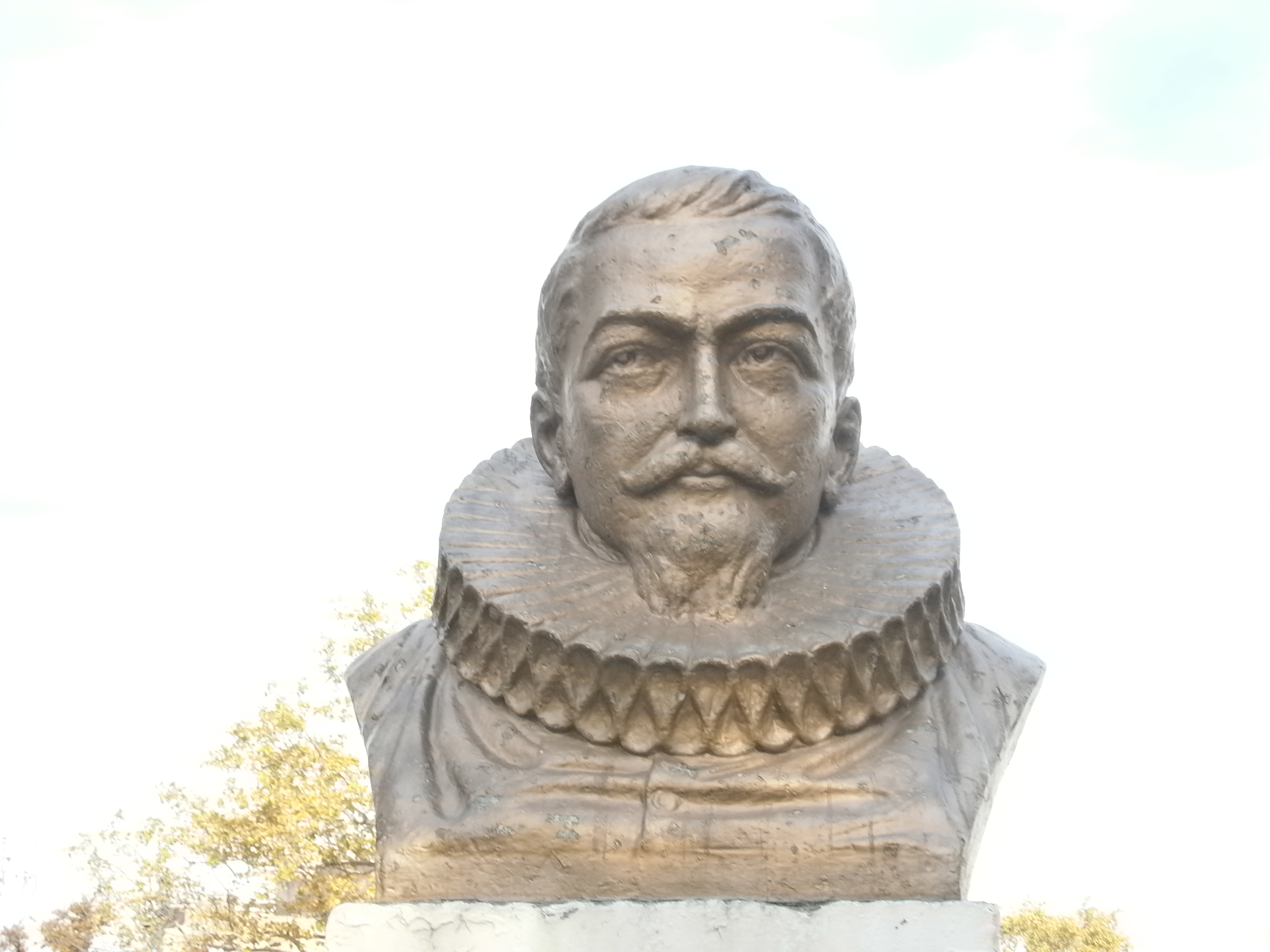
Bust of Henry Hudson in Jersey City Heights

In 1621, the Dutch West India Company (WIC) was founded to exploit trade in the Western Hemisphere, and by 1625 had established a colony at New Amsterdam (Lower Manhattan). In the hope of encouraging settlement the company, in 1629, started to offer vast land grants and the feudal title of patroon. In 1630, Michiel Pauw, a burgemeester of Amsterdam and a director of the company, purchased two tracts from the native population at Hopoghan Hackingh (Castle Point) and at Ashasimus (Harsimus), though the patroonship likely included the entire peninsula between the Hudson and Hackensack Rivers, and possibly his holdings on Staten Eylandt (Staten Island). It was given the Latinized form of his surname (which means "peacock"), Pavonia.

It is said it was sold to him by the Manhattans after they had retreated there after the sale of their home island to Peter Minuit some years before. Initially, a small hut and ferry landing were built at Arresick, called Powles Hoek (Paulus Hook), but Pauw failed to fulfill the other conditions set forth by the company (which included populating the area with at least fifty adults), and was later required to sell his interests back to it. In 1633, the WIC commissioned a house to be built for an appointed superintendent, Jan Everts Bout (aka Jan de Lacher), at Communipaw. Another homestead was built at Ahasimus by his replacement, Hendrick Van Vorst, in 1634. Abraham Isaac Planck (aka Verplank) received a land patent for Paulus Hook on May 1, 1638.

In 1640, David Pietersen de Vries bought from the Tappan a tract of about 500 acres (2.0 km^{2}) and established Vriessendael (Edgewater), about an hour's walk north of Communipaw. In 1643, Hoebuk (Hoboken), was leased by Aert Van Putten, where he built North America's first brewery. These homesteads grew into small, mostly agricultural, communities as the land around them was sold or leased and "bouweries" (home farms) and "plantages" (outlying fields) were developed. Trade between the indigenous and settling populations consisted mostly of wampum, European manufactured goods, and beaver pelts. Though the settlements were small, they were strategic trading posts with a good harbor and foothold on the west bank of what had been named the Noort Rivier (Hudson River).

== Achter Col ==
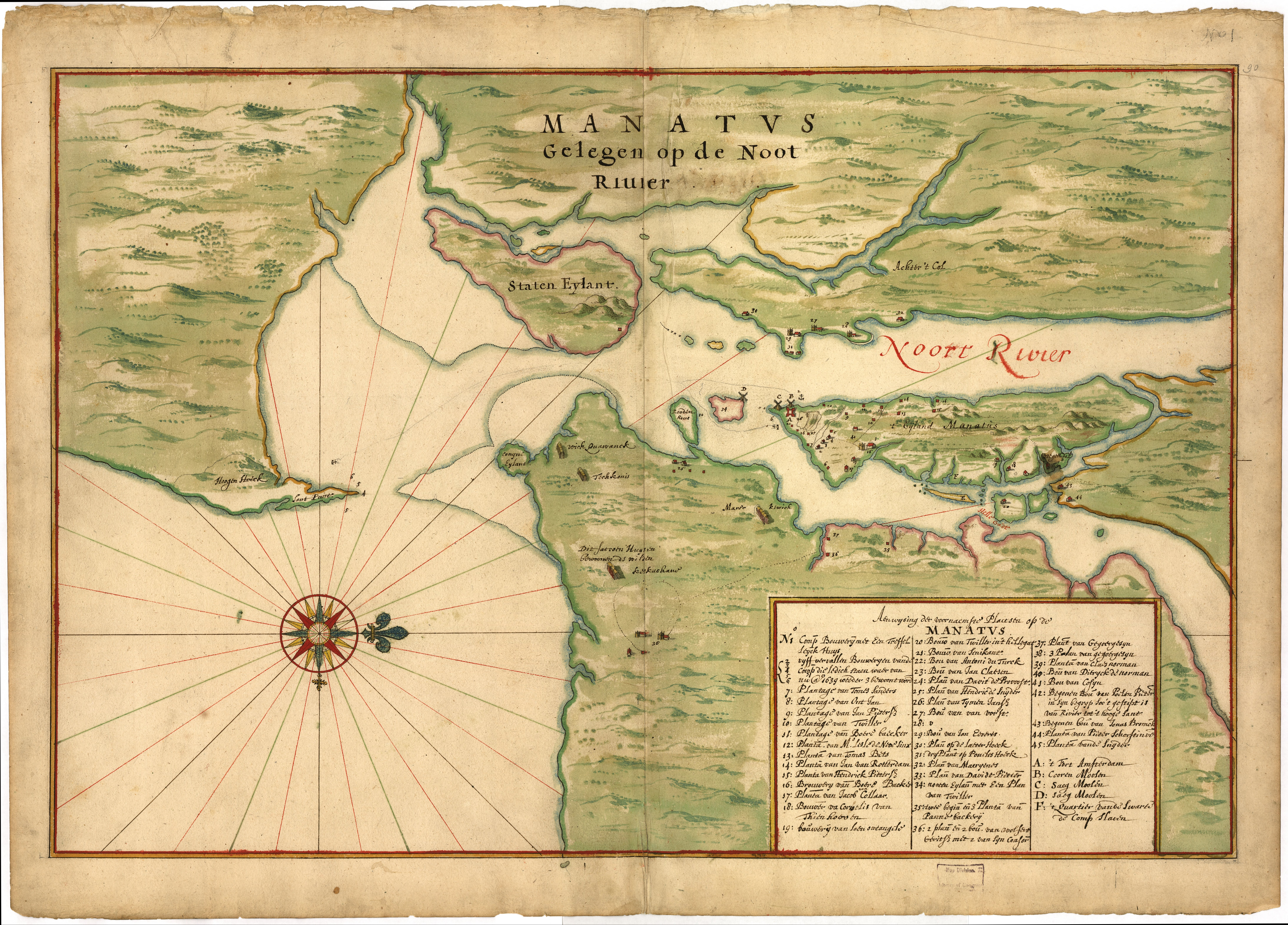
Manatus Map (c1639) Manhattan situated on the North Rivier with numbered key showing settlements: 27. Farm of Van Vorst; 28. v (sic): 29. Farm of Evertsen; 30. Plantation at Lacher's Hook; 31. Plantation at Paulus Hook; 32. Plantation of Maerytensen, which was actually at the fork between Hackensack River and Overpeck Creek near the site of Ackensack, the main Hackensack Indian village.

Place naming in 17th century Europe was frequently influenced by location in reference to other places, shape, age, topography, or geographic features. Such was the case with Achter Kol (Meadowlands/Newark Bay). "Achter", meaning behind, and "kol", meaning ridge or pass, can be translated as the "behind the ridge", in this case Bergen Neck. The appeal of Achter Kol would have been great: Close to Fort Amsterdam, the tidal flats were similar to those of Lowlands, while the riparian lands surrounding them were abundant with beavers, whose pelts represented the potential for great profit.

The river valleys to the north would allow access to the interior. The term Achter Col was used by the New Netherlanders, and later the English colonials, to describe the entire region around Newark Bay and the waters that flow in and out of it. Its name eventually evolved to Arthur Kill, given to the channel that separates Staten Island from the mainland. The Kill Van Kull is the channel from the ridge or mountain pass behind it.

In 1642, Myndert Myndertsen, who bore the title Heer van Nederhorst, received a large land grant (including much of contemporary Bergen and Passaic Counties), where he wished to establish a colony called Achter Kol (Bogota) The site chosen was "five or six hundred paces" from the Hackensack village on Tantaqua (Overpeck Creek). An absentee landlord, he contracted the construction of a "boerderij" (house with attached barn). The crew hired to build it soon engaged the Hackensack, who they had supplied with alcohol, in a fatal confrontation. That incident, and another on Staten Island involving the theft of pigs, led to rising tensions between the natives and settlers.

== Kieft's War ==
Willem Kieft was appointed Director of New Netherland by the Dutch West India Company in 1639, with one of his orders to increase profits from pelts for the fur trade at Achter Kol and its port at Pavonia. Kieft attempted to levy a tax on the Tappan but was ignored. The payment of tribute was common among the tribes, and the British had forced upon it the Pequot. In February 1643, the Mahicans attacked Wappinger encampments in order to collect overdue payment.

At first they fled to New Amsterdam, but after 14 days, fearing for their safety they scattered themselves among the Hackensack and Tappan at Communipaw and to Corlears Hook. Kieft ordered they be attacked on February 25, 1643. The initial strike was a slaughter: 129 Dutch soldiers killed approximately 120 people (including women and children): eighty at Pavonia and thirty at Corlear's Hook (Lower East Side). Overcoming their other rivalries in face of a common enemy, the indigenous populations united and retaliated in October of the same year, attacking the plantations at Pavonia, with survivors fleeing to the fort at the tip of Manhattan. The brewery at Hoebuk survived, its roof not being made of thatch. De Vries, with interest in and better contact with the local population, was able to negotiate temporarily holding off attacks at his farm and the Achter Kol Colony, from which settlers were evacuated.

In August 1643, Oratam (representing his people and other groups), agreed to a truce with the New Netherlanders. The peace did not hold and for the next two years the whole of the province was at war. It was not until August 30, 1645 that a treaty to cease hostilities was finally concluded.

== Peter Stuyvesant ==
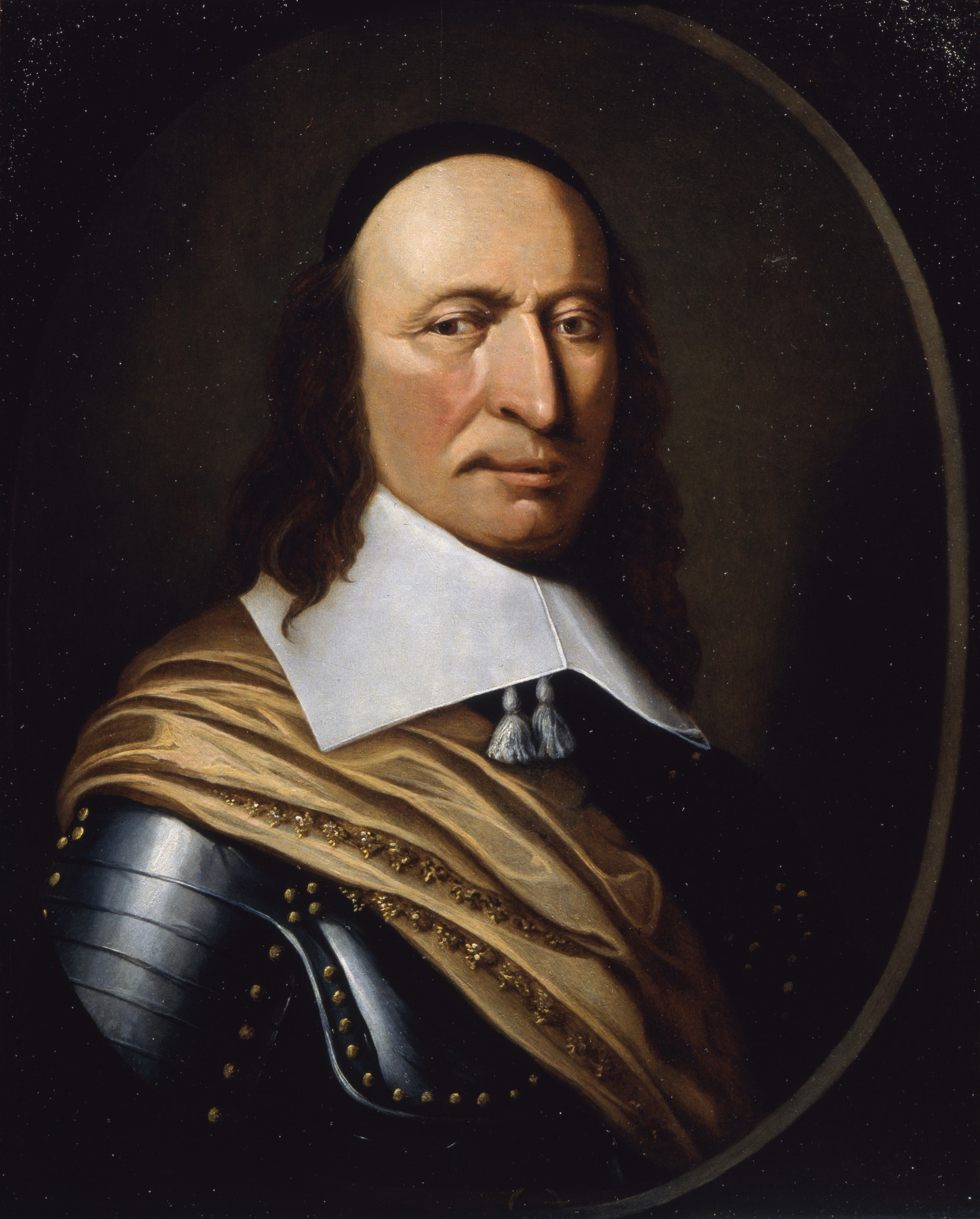
Petrus Stuyvesant (c. 1660), was the only "governor" to have the title of Director-General of New Netherland.

Pieter Stuyvesant was selected to replace Kieft as Director-General of New Netherland and arrived on May 11, 1647. Further colonization of the area proceeded slowly. In 1646, a land patent at Konstapel's Hoeck (Constable Hook) was granted to New Amsterdam's chief constable, Jacob Jacobsen Roy, who declined to settle. A year later, Maryn Andriansen, who had led the attack at Corlear's Hook, received a land patent of 169 acres at Awiehaken (Weehawken). It was incidents further afield that led to the area becoming more seriously settled. In 1654, the Dutch Republic lost their colony in northern Brazil known as New Holland to the Portuguese. Many of its residents emigrated to New Netherland. It was in that year that a series of land patents were made at Communipaw and Harsimus extending to Achter Col, as well as farther south along the bay at Minkakwa and Pamrapo.

In 1655, the settlers again came in fatal conflict with the native population in the Peach War. According to popular belief, it started when a young Lenape girl was shot by a Dutchman as she attempted to pluck fruit from a peach tree in an orchard on Manhattan. Her murder elicited calls for revenge from the native population, who did a house-to-house search of New Amsterdam. Not finding the perpetrator, they prepared to leave, but were attacked. At the time, Stuyvesant and his troops were on an expedition to the Zuydt Rivier (Delaware River), where they had forced the colony of New Sweden to submit to the rule of his government. Several hundred Lenape attacked Pavonia and Staten Island, killing 40 settlers. One hundred hostages were taken and held at Paulus Hook. When later ransomed they returned to New Amsterdam, and once again the settlements on the west shore of the Noort Rivier were evacuated.

== Bergen Square ==
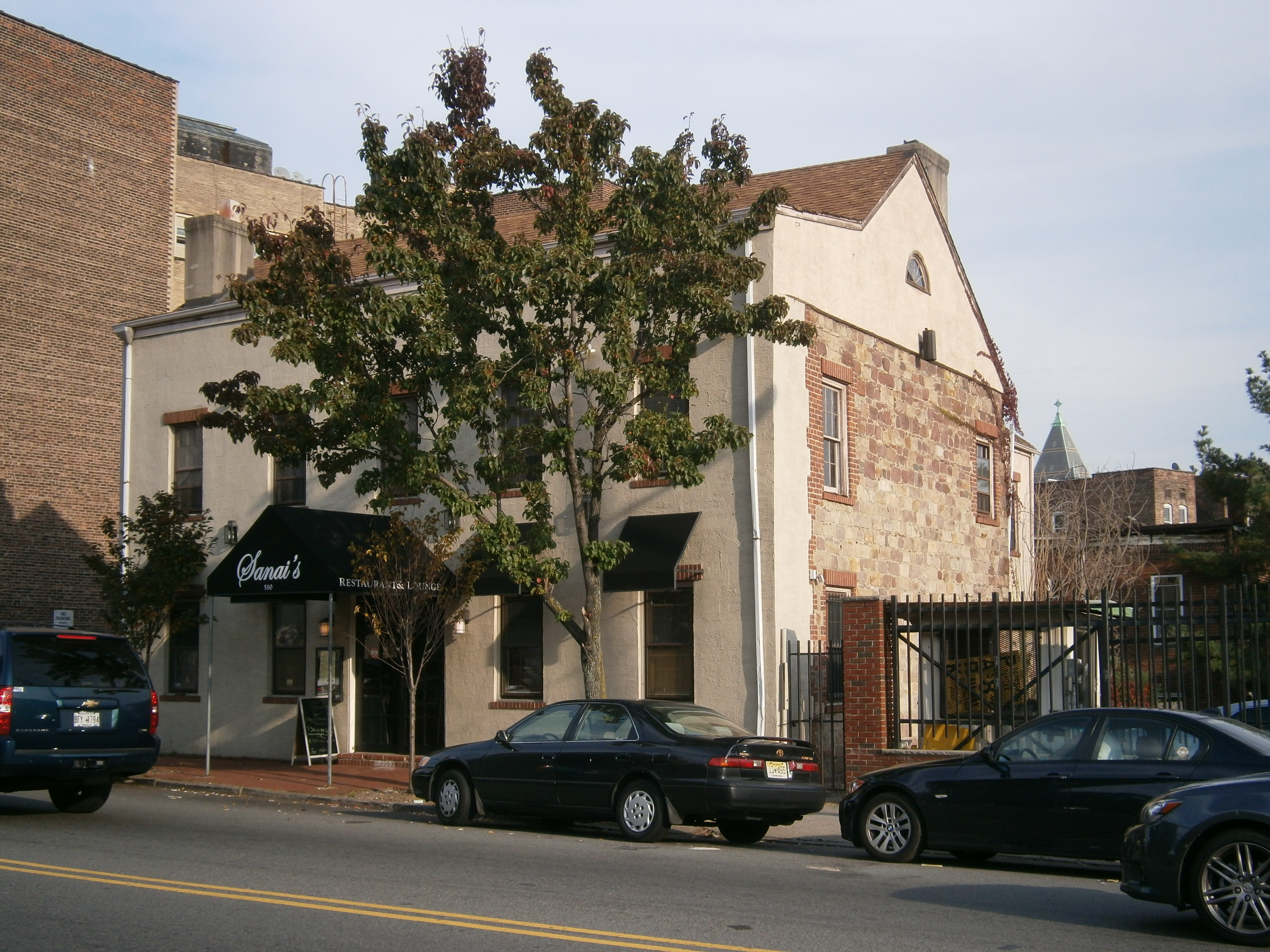
Newkirk House, built in 1690, is the oldest structure in Jersey City.

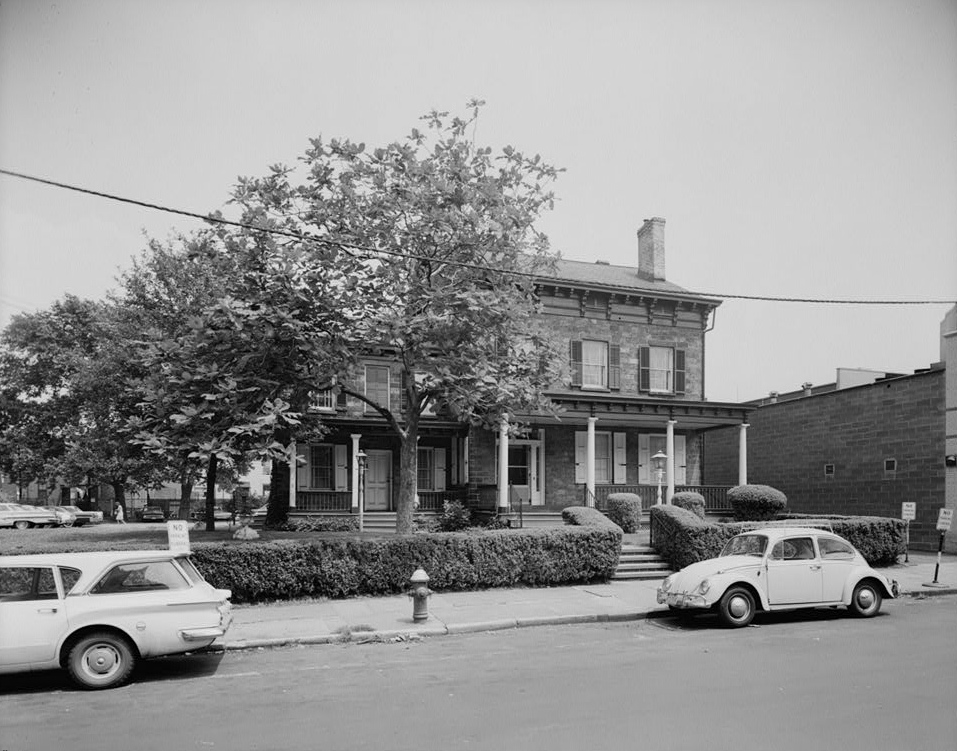
The Van Wagenen House was built by family of first settlers to Bergen.

Responding to lobbying by those who wished to return to their land west of the North River and to re-establish their claim there, Stuyvesant, on January 10, 1658 "re-purchased" most of the land that would become Bergen Township. The conveyance (as translated from the Dutch) read:

Therinques, Wappapen, Saghkow, Kagkennip, Bomokan, Memewockan, Sames, Wewenatokee, to the Director General and Council of New Netherland for land on the Westside of the North River from the great Clip above Wiehacken to above the Island Sikakes, thence to the Kill van Col, so along to Constable's Hoeck, thence again to the Clip above Wiceacken.

This purchase paved the way for the founding of the village at Bergen (Bergen Square). Permission was granted by Stuyvesant to the establish a village; the town was officially settled in 1660. There are various opinions as to the origin of the name given by the European settlers. Some say that it was named after any of number of towns in the Netherlands or the city in Norway Others believe it comes from the word bergen, which in the Germanic languages of northern Europe means hills, and could describe a most distinct geological feature of the region, The Palisades. Yet another interpretation is that it comes from the Dutch word bergen, meaning to save or to recover, prompted by the settlers' return after they had fled attacks by the native population.

Concerted efforts were made to ensure the success of the new settlement, situated atop the hill west of Communipaw, which was made "distinct and separate" village. It was laid out following a design by Jacques Cortelyou, Surveyor General of New Amsterdam: 800 feet (240 m) on each side, to be surrounded by wooden palisade.

In September 1661, a court of justice was granted to Bergen, partially removing it from the jurisdiction of New Amsterdam, under which it had previously fallen. This act established the oldest autonomous municipality in New Jersey. Bergen is also home to the longest continuously used school site and Christian congregation in the state . Within its jurisdiction fell the communities at Pavonia, Communipaw, Hoebuck, and Achter Col.

In December of the same year, a charter for ferry between Bergen (at Communipaw) and Manhattan was granted. In February 1663, an ordinance regarding a common well was effected. The settlers were sluggish building a palisade to protect the village and in November 1663 an ordinance was passed to see it completed. so that farmers and fishermen could retreat if threatened by attack.

== Second Anglo-Dutch War ==
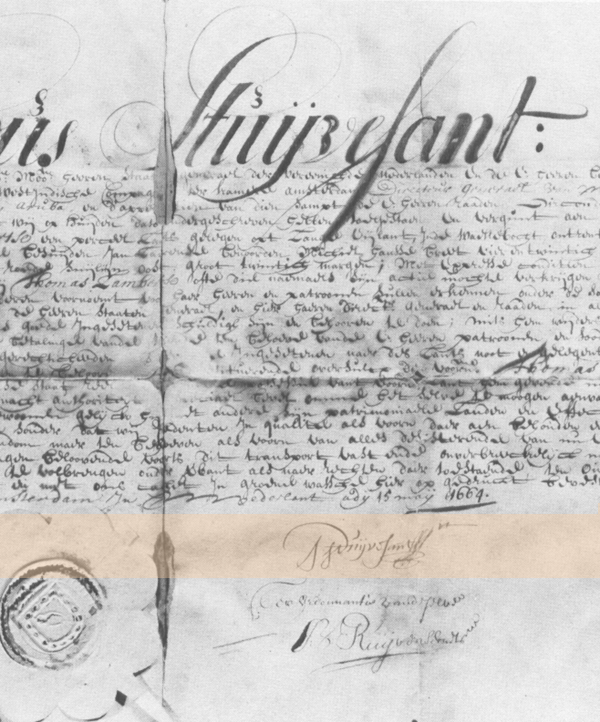
Stuyvesant's signature

Though not attacked, Bergen was threatened. On August 27, 1664, four English frigates entered the Upper New York Bay, demanding surrender of the fort at New Amsterdam, and by extension, all of New Netherland. After some days, Stuyvesant acquiesced, unable to rouse the population to a military defense. The indifferent response from the West India Company to previous requests for protection against "the deplorable and tragic massacres" by the natives had gone unheeded. Hence a lack of weapons, gunpowder, reinforcements and ships made New Amsterdam defenseless.

Stuyvesant made the best of a bad situation and successfully negotiated good terms from his "too powerful enemies." In the Articles of Capitulation, Stuyvesant and his council secured the principle of tolerance in Article VIII, which assured New Netherlanders that they "shall keep and enjoy the liberty of their consciences" in religion under English rule. The capture of the city was one out of a series of attacks on Dutch colonies that resulted in the Second Anglo-Dutch War between England and the Dutch Republic. The village, which had begun construction of a block house at the town gates, was required to garrison English soldiers.

== Elizabethtown Assembly ==
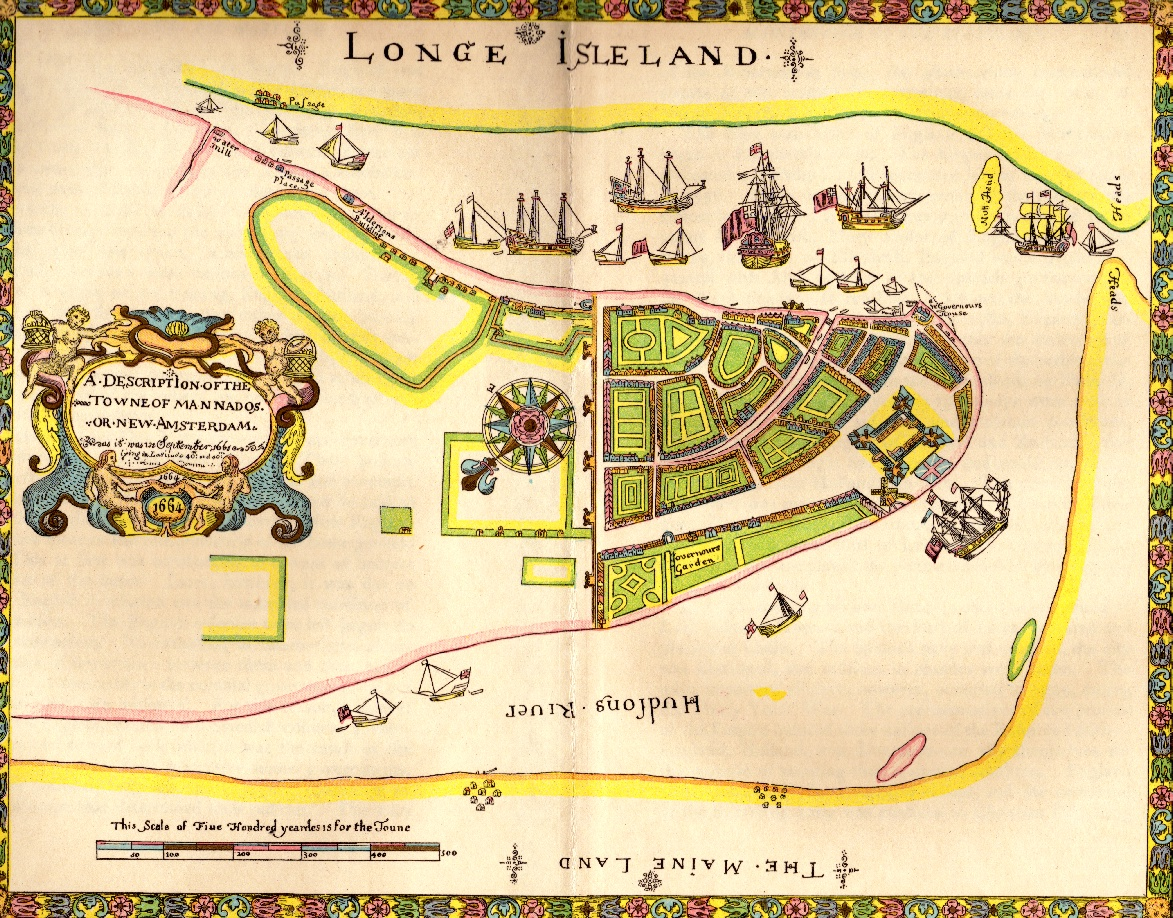
1664 Duke's Plan showing settlements along North River at time of the surrender of Fort Amsterdam

New Netherland was quickly divvied up, the lands west of the newly named city of New York becoming part of proprietary colony of East Jersey; Staten Island's status would be determined 10 years later. By-passing Bergen, the English chose as its capital a site close to Arthur Kill, naming it Elizabethtown, after the wife of its proprietor, Sir George Carteret. On October 28, 1664, the Elizabethtown Tract, taking in lands southwest of Achter Col, was purchased from three Raritan.

An assembly was held in 1664, attended by representatives of Bergen. Soon after, the Concession and Agreement was issued providing religious freedom and recognition of private property in the colony. For those living in Bergen and surrounding areas life was not much changed under English rule, though they were required to pledge loyalty to the new government. English speaking settlers, mostly from New England and Long Island, came to the province, concentrating on the Elizabethtown Tract and Newark Tract, and to the north at the English Neighborhood. The wide waterways that separated them geographically mirrored the cultural divide and allowed the New Netherlanders to retain their language, religion, traditions, and local political power.

During negotiations for The Treaty of Breda, English commissioners' offers to return New Netherland in exchange for sugar factories on the coast of Suriname were refused. Upon its signing on July 31, 1667, English possession and rule were formalized. In 1668, they granted a charter for the "Towne and Corporation of Bergen". The English also recorded many land purchases and transfers to both Dutch and English-speaking settlers, including those at Minkaque and Ramapo (Bayonne). During this period they also confirmed previous patents and deeds, in 1665 for a land owned by Nicolas Verlet at Hobuk (Hoboken), and in 1669 for a large tract (of 2260 acres) at Achinigeu-hach (or "Ackingsah-sack") (Hackensack River/Overpeck Creek) given earlier to Sarah Kiersted in gratitude for her work as emissary and interpreter by Oratam.

The treaty proved to be ineffective, fighting continued (as the Third Anglo-Dutch War), and in August 1673 the Dutch "recaptured" New Netherland. In November of that year an assembly was held at Elzabethtown enacting "Laws and Ordinances" for towns in Achter Col. On December 18, 1673, "Freedoms and Exemptions" were granted to towns in Achter Col.

== Province of New Jersey ==
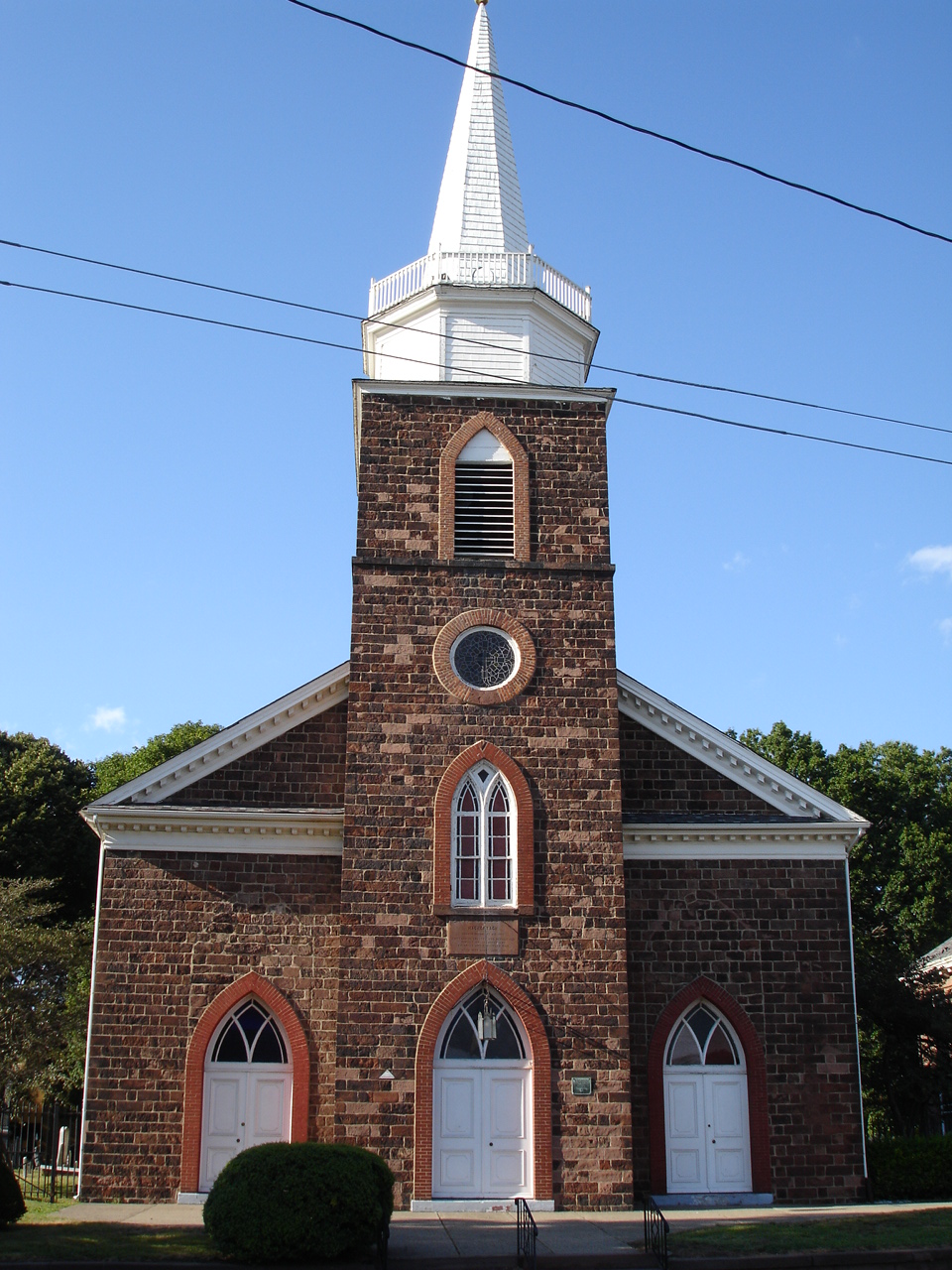
First Reformed Dutch Church, Hackensack

News that New Amsterdam had been "re-taken" did not arrive in Holland until January 1674, at which point negotiations for The Treaty of Westminster were well advanced. Its ratification by the States-General of the Netherlands on March 5, 1674 ended the Third Anglo-Dutch War, and control of New Netherland, including Bergen, was conclusively relinquished to the English.

On March 7, 1683, East Jersey was divided into four counties: Essex, Middlesex, Monmouth and Bergen, which kept the name given by the New Netherlanders. Bergen ran from Bergen Point (Bayonne) between the North and Hackensack Rivers to ambiguous New York-New Jersey state line (see seal of Bergen County), its administrative seat at the Towne of Bergen. Ten years later, in October 1693, the counties were re-aligned and Bergen grew to include more territories west of the Hackensack, though not the Lenape/Netherlander trading post that would grow into the city of the same name.

In 1702, East Jersey and West Jersey were united as a royal, rather than proprietary colony. New Jersey and New York shared one governor, the first being Lord Cornbury. It was not until 1738, when New Jersey petitioned the crown for a distinct administration from New York, that it was granted its own governor.

In 1710, Bergen County, by royal decree of Queen Anne of Great Britain was enlarged to include what had been a part of Essex County. The village of Hackensack (in the newly formed New Barbados Township) was seen as being more easily reached by the majority of the Bergen's inhabitants, and hence was chosen as the county seat.

The Town of Bergen was given a Royal Charter on January 4, 1714.

== Hudson-Bergen Line ==
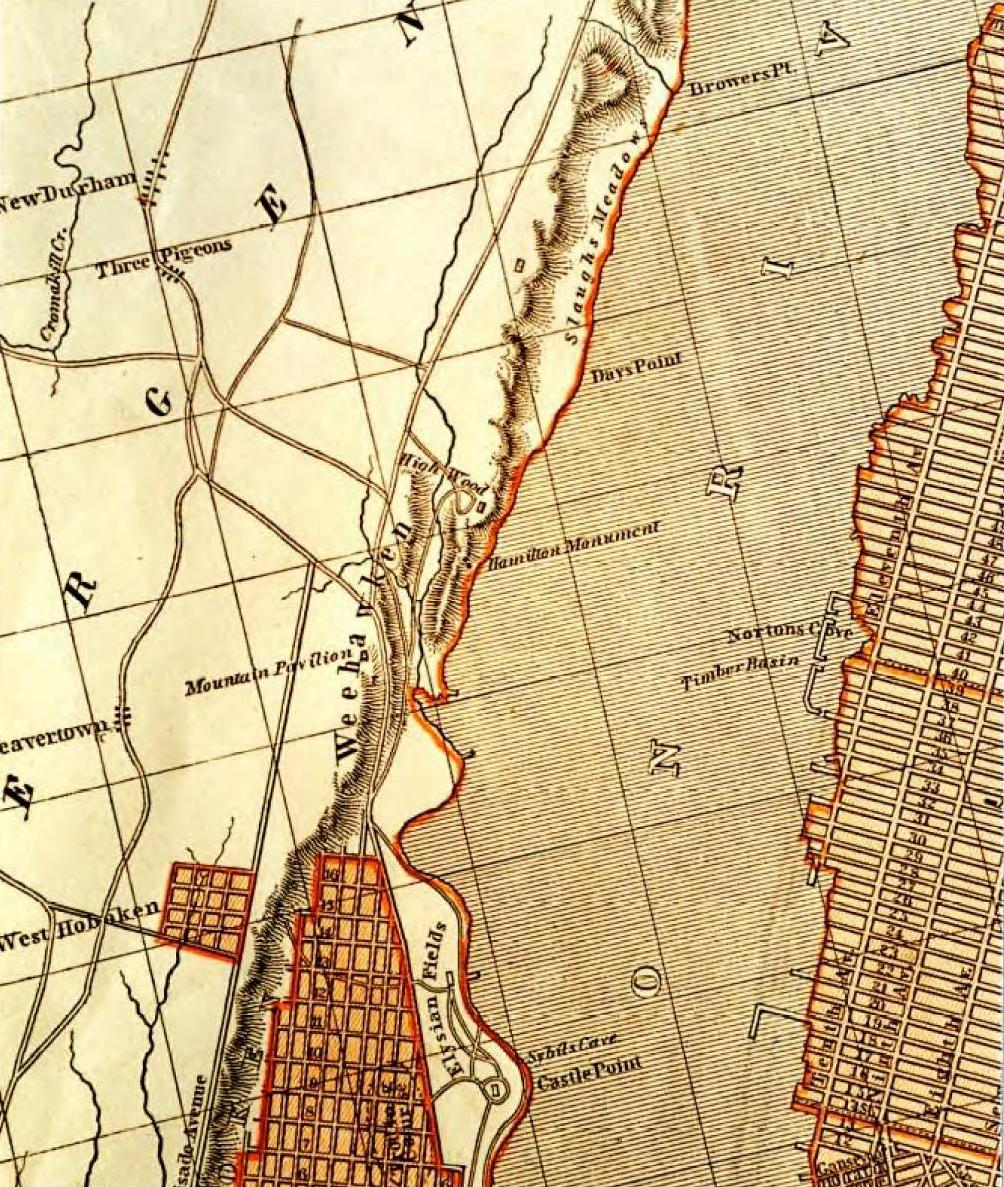
An 1841 map soon after Hudson's County creation shows its northern reaches as still very rural and still very 'Bergen'.

Bergen County was split into three parts when, by an Act of the New Jersey Legislature on February 21, 1798, 104 newly formed townships were created throughout the state.

As originally constituted, Bergen Township began at Bergen Point and included the area between Hudson's River to the east and the Hackensack River to the west, north to the present-day Hudson-Bergen line. Why this particular point was chosen is not clear, as there is no clear geological or topographical feature indicating a natural separation. It may have been the place where the Lenape sub groups-the Hackensack and the Tappan-saw the extent of their territories. It may have also been the border between the patroonships of Pavonia and Vriessendael, and corresponds to Stuyvesant's re-purchase. As described in the charter for "Towne of Bergen" in 1668, the northern border of the town was determined by landmarks that no longer exist.

Hackensack Township included those lands east of the river of the same name, north of the contemporary Hudson-Bergen line, and the area became known as the English Neighborhood. The present-day city of Hackensack, was part of New Barbadoes Township, which ran northward from Newark Bay, including New Barbadoes Neck between the Hackensack and Passaic rivers, and portions of contemporary Passaic County.

In September 1840, Hudson County was created by separation from Bergen County and annexation of New Barbadoes Neck. The place chosen for the county line atop the Palisades was the original northern border for Bergen Township. On April 10, 1843, by an Act of the New Jersey Legislature, Bergen Township was split in two, leading to the incorporation of Township of North Bergen. Bergenline Avenue, running from the Jersey City border to Nungessers at Fairview through the North Hudson communities, likely takes its name from this division.

== Legacy ==
The original grid laid out for Bergen in 1661 can still be seen at Bergen Square, in the immediate vicinity of which are Old Bergen Church and cemeteries founded by the first settlers and their descendants. A statue of Peter Stuyvesant, commemorating the 250th anniversary of its founding, sits on the grounds of the longest continuously used school site in New Jersey, which had also been established by them. The square, with a geometry typical of small towns in the Lowlands, was the first in North America that would become known as a "Philadelphia" square.

There are many buildings throughout the region built in the Bergen Dutch. and Dutch Colonial styles, including numerous farm houses and Dutch Reformed Churches. The still-intact Sip Manor, originally built at the village of Bergen, was moved in the 1920s to Westfield, NJ. The oldest standing building in Hudson is the 1690 Newkirk House on Summit Avenue. Another colonial home (c 1742) was built by one of the region's first families, the Van Vorsts, on land that had been part of Pavonia (now Jersey City Heights). The Steuben House (1752) is a noted example of Bergen Dutch sandstone architecture, located at New Bridge Landing, a historic site dedicated to the preservation of colonial architecture and history.

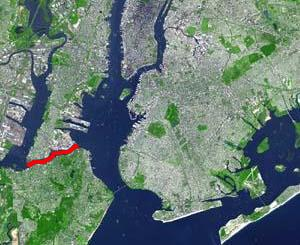
The Kill Van Kull is shown here in red. The vast oyster beds along the banks of the peninsula may have inspired the original name "Oyster Island".

While they did intermarry with new immigrants, the New Netherlanders retained much of their language, religion, and tradition. When writing in the early 19th century, Washington Irving often referred (comically) to the west bank of the Hudson, particularly Communipaw, as being the stronghold of Dutch culture. The Jersey Dutch language was a variant of the Dutch language spoken in and around Bergen and Passaic counties until the early 20th century.

The region abounds in place names often taken from Dutch surnames or geographical references, with Paulus Hook a combination of both. Lenape phrases, transformed through Dutch and English are still in use, such as Hoboken, Hackensack, Paramus, Secaucus, and Wyckoff. Kill Van Kull retains its purely Dutch name.

The name Bergen is widely used, not only for the county itself but also in Bergen Point, Bergen Hill, Bergen Arches, Bergenline Avenue, Bergenfield, among many others. The patroonship of Pavonia lends its name to an avenue and PATH station in Jersey City, while the mascot of Saint Peter's University is a peacock.

The concept of religious freedom (as well as the recognition of private property) is often considered to be the most enduring legacies of New Netherland. Both the Articles of Transfer (outlining the terms of surrender to the English), and the Concession and Agreement provided for the right to worship as one wished, and were incorporated into subsequent city, state, and national constitutions in the United States. Many words, including the most American Yankee, and the tradition of Santa Claus come from the settlers of New Netherland.

Like The Netherlands, Northeastern New Jersey is considered to be "diverse" and "tolerant", a place where many people from different ethnic, economic, and religious backgrounds interact on a daily basis while still maintaining their distinct identities. The concept of "home rule" allows citizens and residents to have direct influence on their immediate neighborhoods, and at the same time participate in a society which supersedes civic boundaries.

== See also ==
- Toponymy of Bergen, New Netherland
- Forts of New Netherland
- New Netherland Dutch
- New Netherland settlements
- New Netherland Project
- Patroon
- Etymologies of place names in Hudson County, New Jersey
