= Van Vorst Township, New Jersey =

Human settlement in New Jersey, United States of America

Coordinates: 40.7183°N 74.0462°W

Van Vorst was a township that existed in Hudson County, New Jersey, United States, from 1841 to 1851, that is now a neighborhood in Jersey City. The township was located on the Hudson River, to the west and north of the original territory of Jersey City and across from Manhattan.

Van Vorst was incorporated as a township by an Act of the New Jersey Legislature on April 12, 1841, from portions of Bergen Township. Cornelius Van Vorst and his family founded and laid out the street grid for the township and donated land for a town square style park that became Van Vorst Park. The township committee was led by Van Vorst and first met at Weaver's Arms, a saloon on the south side of Newark Avenue, near Jersey Avenue. In 1845, the first street was laid at the corner of Grove Street and Railroad Avenue (now Columbus Drive) for $12. Grove Street was later paved from Newark to Pavonia Avenues.

In 1847, a firehouse was built on Bay Street off of Newark Avenue for $450, which also served as the Town Hall. After annexation, it later served as the Jersey City Fire Department headquarters from 1871 to 1933.

As of the 1850 United States census, the township had a total population of 4,617.

On March 18, 1851, Van Vorst Township was annexed by Jersey City.

== See also ==
- Harsimus
- Van Vorst Park
- Cornelius Van Vorst
- Barrow Mansion
- Grace Church Van Vorst
- Van Vorst House
