= Barrow Mansion =

Historic house in New Jersey, United States

- Dr. William Barrow Mansion
- U.S. National Register of Historic Places
- U.S. Historic district – Contributing property
- New Jersey Register of Historic Places
- The Barrow Mansion in 2026

- Location within Hudson County, New Jersey Location within New Jersey Location within the United States
- Location: 83 Wayne Street, Jersey City, New Jersey
- Coordinates: 40°43′12″N 74°2′56″W
- Area: 0.1 acres (0.040 ha)
- Built: 1835-1837
- Architect: Van Vorst, Cornelius
- Architectural style: Greek Revival
- NRHP reference No.: 77000872
- NJRHP No.: 1459

Significant dates
- Added to NRHP: May 2, 1977
- Designated NJRHP: December 20, 1976

The Dr. William Barrow Mansion is located at 83 Wayne Street between Barrow Street and Jersey Avenue in Downtown Jersey City, Hudson County, New Jersey, United States. The mansion was added to the National Register of Historic Places on May 2, 1977, and is located within the Van Vorst Park Historic District, which itself was dedicated on March 5, 1980, and is roughly bounded by Railroad Avenue, and Henderson, Grand, Bright, and Monmouth Streets.

The house was one of two similar homes constructed by Cornelius Van Vorst, a founder of the Township of Van Vorst and mayor of Jersey City from 1860 to 1862. The Van Vorsts were a prominent family who trace their North American roots to the third superintendent of the patroonship Pavonia, whose bowery was located at nearby Harsimus. The family lends its name to the nearby Van Vorst Park which was part of the township. Cornelius Van Vorst's sister Eliza was married to Dr. William Barrow.

Built between 1835–1837 and also known as the Ionic House, the wooden Greek Revival structure has five Ionic columns around a two-story portico. The columns divide the building into four equal bays, effecting an offset center hall. As the columns are evenly spaced, the front door is not in the center, but set off to the right. The interior, of late Federal/early Greek Revival style with some Victorian décor, features a ballroom, carved Italian marble fireplaces and twelve-foot ceilings.

The mansion stood alongside the Van Vorst Mansion, separated only by a lawn, and near the Van Vorst family farmhouse. In 1874 Van Vorst sold his home to Dr. Benjamin Edge and it was later demolished in the 1920s.

The YMCA bought the Barrow Mansion in the 1890s, adding a rifle range and gymnasium. St. Matthew's Evangelical Lutheran Church purchased the residence in 1897 and used it as a parish house. The pistol range was converted to a two-lane bowling alley in the basement. The following year, St. Matthew's Church was built on the lawn between the Barrow and Van Vorst mansions. The church flourished until the 1920s and the former mansion and parish house became a lively and popular social center.

As the neighborhood changed in the post-war era, the mansion fell into disrepair. In 1984 the Barrow Mansion Development Corporation (BMDC) was founded to renovate the mansion and operate it as a center for community service. The BMDC's board is composed of members from St. Matthew's Lutheran Church and the wider community. The BMDC leases the mansion from church, and received grants in 1992 and 1995 from the New Jersey Historic Trust and other grantors for building restoration. The mansion currently provides office space to small businesses and non-profits, is home to the Attic Ensemble theater company and Jersey City Children's Theater, and hosts Hudson County's largest number of twelve-step groups and other community meetings (over 1100 in 2010).

== See also ==
- National Register of Historic Places listings in Hudson County, New Jersey
- New Jersey Register of Historic Places
