= Grace Church Van Vorst =

Historic church in New Jersey, United States

- U.S. National Register of Historic Places
- New Jersey Register of Historic Places
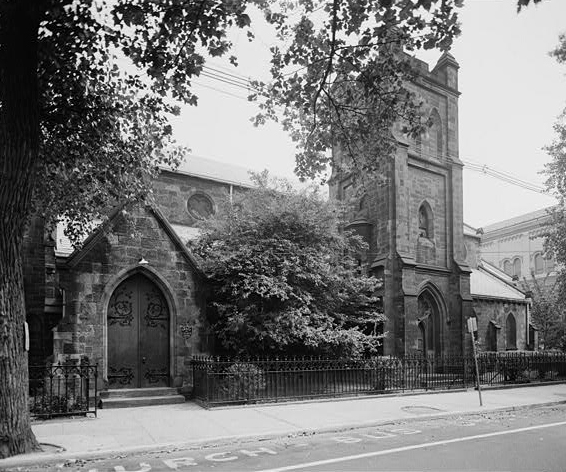
- Grace Church Van Vorst in 1967.

- Location within Hudson County, New Jersey Location within New Jersey Location within the United States
- Location: 268 2nd Street, Jersey City, New Jersey
- Coordinates: 40°43′21.814″N 74°2′40.495″W
- Area: 0.4 acres (0.16 ha)
- Built: 1853
- Architect: Detlef Lienau
- Architectural style: English Gothic
- NRHP reference No.: 79001492
- NJRHP No.: 1506

Significant dates
- Added to NRHP: August 1, 1979
- Designated NJRHP: May 24, 1979

The Grace Church Van Vorst, is located in Jersey City, Hudson County, New Jersey, United States. The church was added to the National Register of Historic Places on August 1, 1979. The church was built in 1853 and was named after the former Van Vorst Township. The church is an English Gothic-style Episcopal church which was designed by Detlef Lienau. The building is constructed with brownstone and has a slate roof. The church was expanded in 1864 with the addition of two bays to the west and a baptistry added midway on the south side of the building. The 57-foot-high (17 m) square tower was added in 1912. Adjacent to the church is a rectory that was also designed by Lienau in a similar style to the church.

== Gallery ==
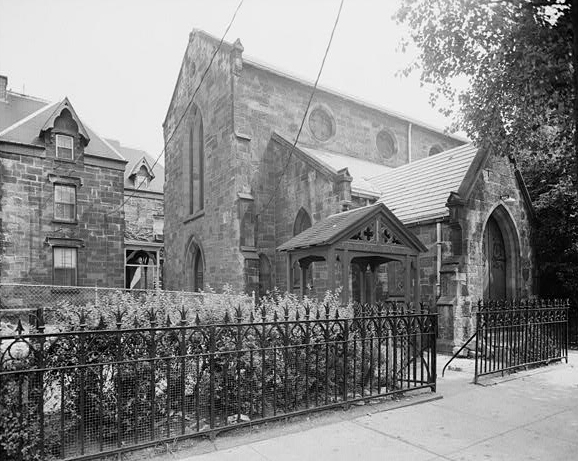
View of southern side.

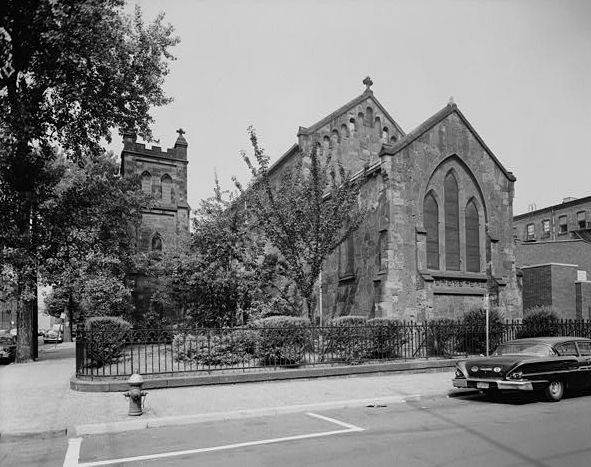
View of eastern side.

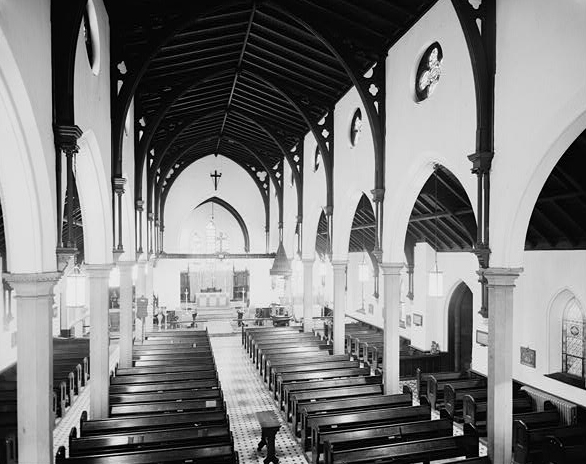
View of interior.

== See also ==
- National Register of Historic Places listings in Hudson County, New Jersey
- Paul Moore - former rector of the church.
