= Cornelius Van Vorst =

American politician (1822–1906)

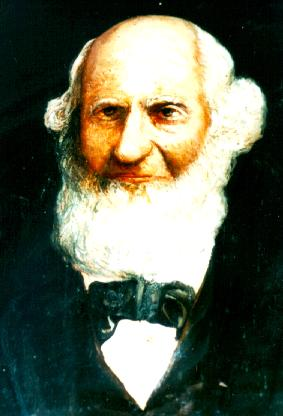

12th Mayor of Jersey City
- In office 1860–1862
- Preceded by: Dudley S. Gregory
- Succeeded by: John B. Romar

Personal details
- Born: March 7, 1822 Jersey City, New Jersey
- Died: November 19, 1906 Milford, Delaware
- Spouse: Sophia Phillips

Cornelius Van Vorst (March 7, 1822 – November 19, 1906) was the twelfth Mayor of Jersey City, serving from 1860 to 1862.

== Biography ==
Cornelius and his family founded and laid out the street grid for Van Vorst Township, which was incorporated in 1841 and was dissolved when it was annexed by Jersey City in 1851. He also donated land for a town square style park that became Van Vorst Park.

From 1854 to 1874, the kitchen step of the Van Vorst Mansion was known to be the slab of marble that was originally the base of the statue of King George III that was toppled by the Sons of Liberty at Bowling Green in New York. After the statue had been torn down in 1776, the slab made its way across the Hudson River and was reused in Paulus Hook as the gravestone of a Major John Smith of the Royal Highlands Regiment, the Black Watch, in 1783. When Smith's grave site was leveled in 1804, the slab became a stone step at two successive mansions with the latter being the Van Vorst Mansion in 1854. In 1874, Van Vorst donated the stone to the New York Historical Society. The mansion was sold later that year to Dr. Benjamin Edge whose family resided there for many years. In 1925, it was sold at auction by Nelson J.H. Edge and replaced by the Wayne Court Apartments around 1927.

Van Vorst also constructed the Barrow Mansion, a twin to the Van Vorst Mansion, between 1835 and 1837. Dr. William Barrow, a New York City physician, bought the mansion after marrying Van Vorst's sister Eliza. The two mansions were separated by only a lawn for many years. After the death of Dr. Barrow and his wife Eliza, the YMCA purchased the mansion in 1890 and added a gymnasium and rifle range in the basement. In 1897, St. Matthew's German Evangelical Lutheran Church bought the mansion for use as a parish house and replaced the rifle range with a two-lane bowling alley. In 1898, it built a church on the former lawn between the two mansions. In 1984, the Barrow Mansion Development Corporation was founded to renovate the mansion and now operates it as a community center.
