= North Hudson County Railway =

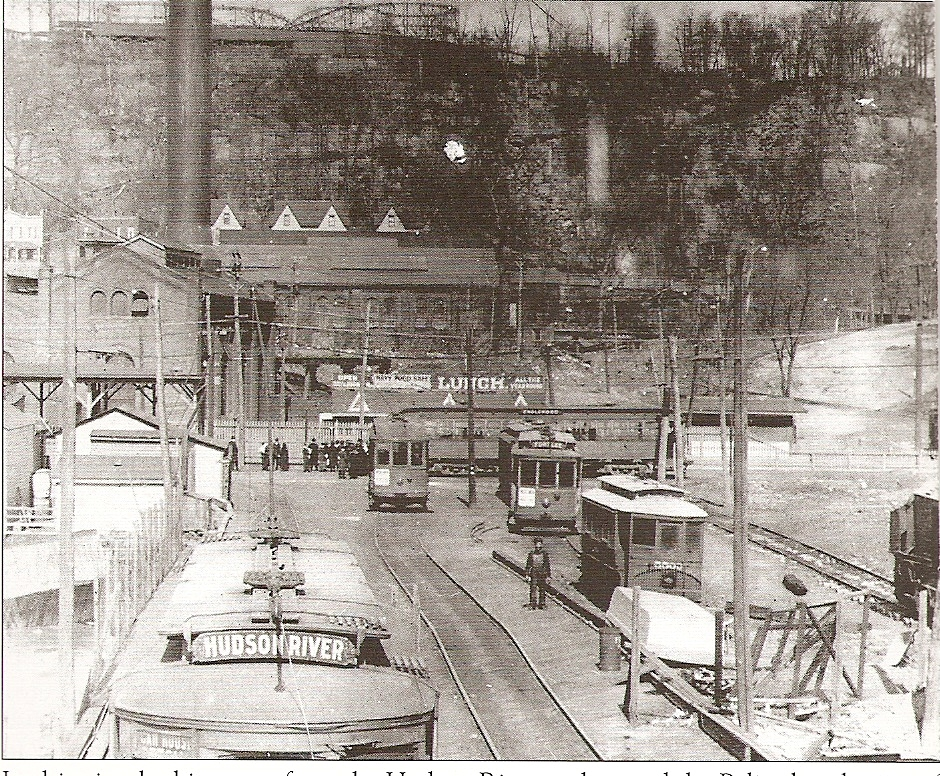
Trolleys carried passengers from the Edgewater Ferry Terminal up the cliffs to the amusement park and beyond.

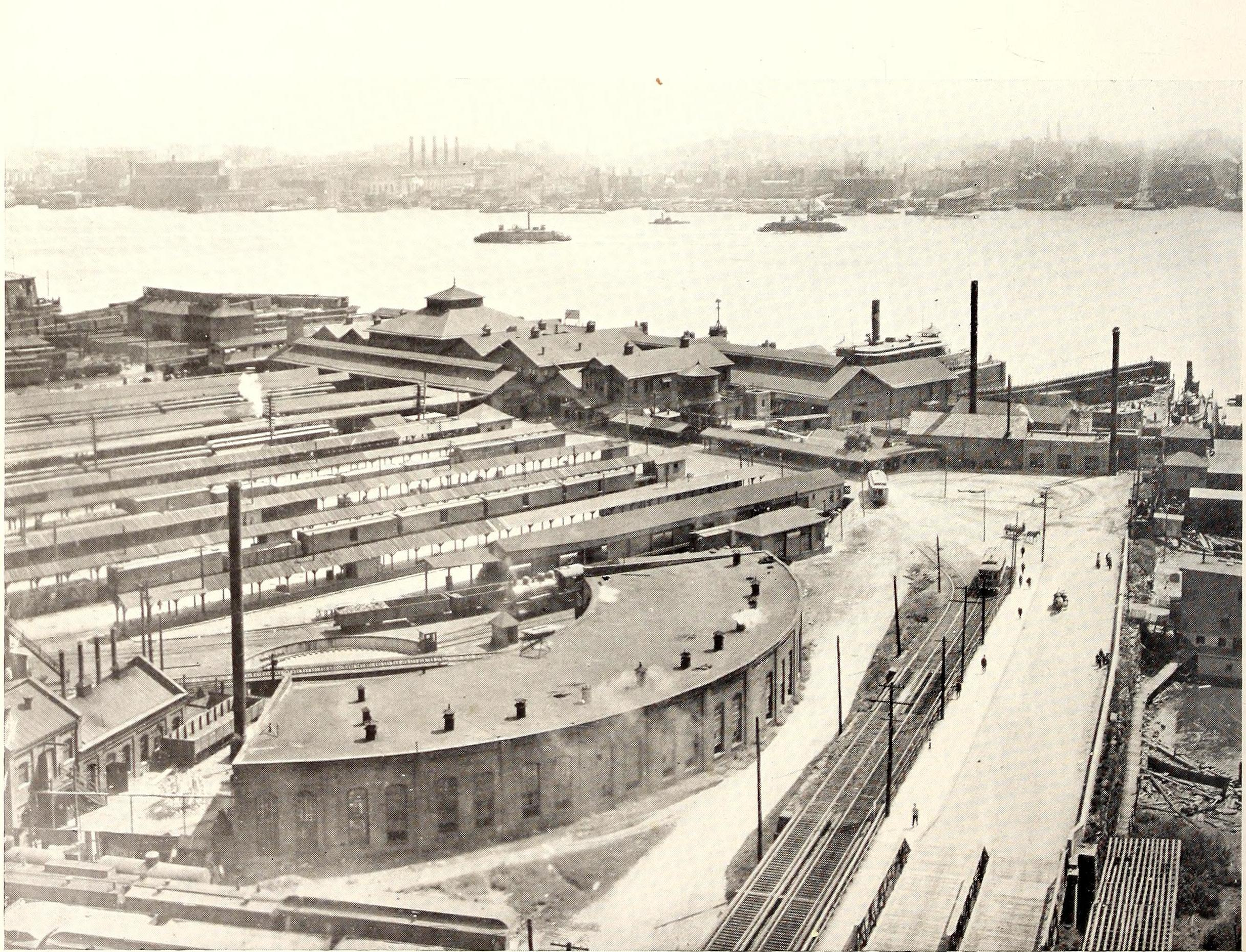
North Hudson County Railway at the foot of Pershing Road at Weehawken Terminal ca. 1911

The North Hudson Railway Company built and operated a streetcar system in Hudson County and southeast Bergen County, New Jersey before and after the start of the 20th century. It was founded by Hillric J. Bonn who became the first President in 1865 and served for 26 years until his death, and eventually taken over by the Public Service Railway. In its endeavors to overcome the formidable obstacle of ascending the lower Hudson Palisades, or Bergen Hill, it devised numerous innovative engineering solutions including funicular wagon lifts, an inclined elevated railway, an elevator and viaducts.

The oldest predecessor line of North Hudson County Railway opened 1861. Three companies were consolidated in 1874 to form the North Hudson County Railway Company. North Hudson acquired the Pavonia Horse Railroad Company in 1891, opened the Hudson & Bergen Traction Company in 1893, and opened the Palisades Railroad in 1894.

North Hudson County Railway included 12.75 miles (20.52 km) of at-grade and 1.25 miles (2.01 km) of elevated trackage. Bonn was always involved in other road and real estate projects in the county. He resided in Weehawken, where a street is named in his honor.

== Wagon lifts ==
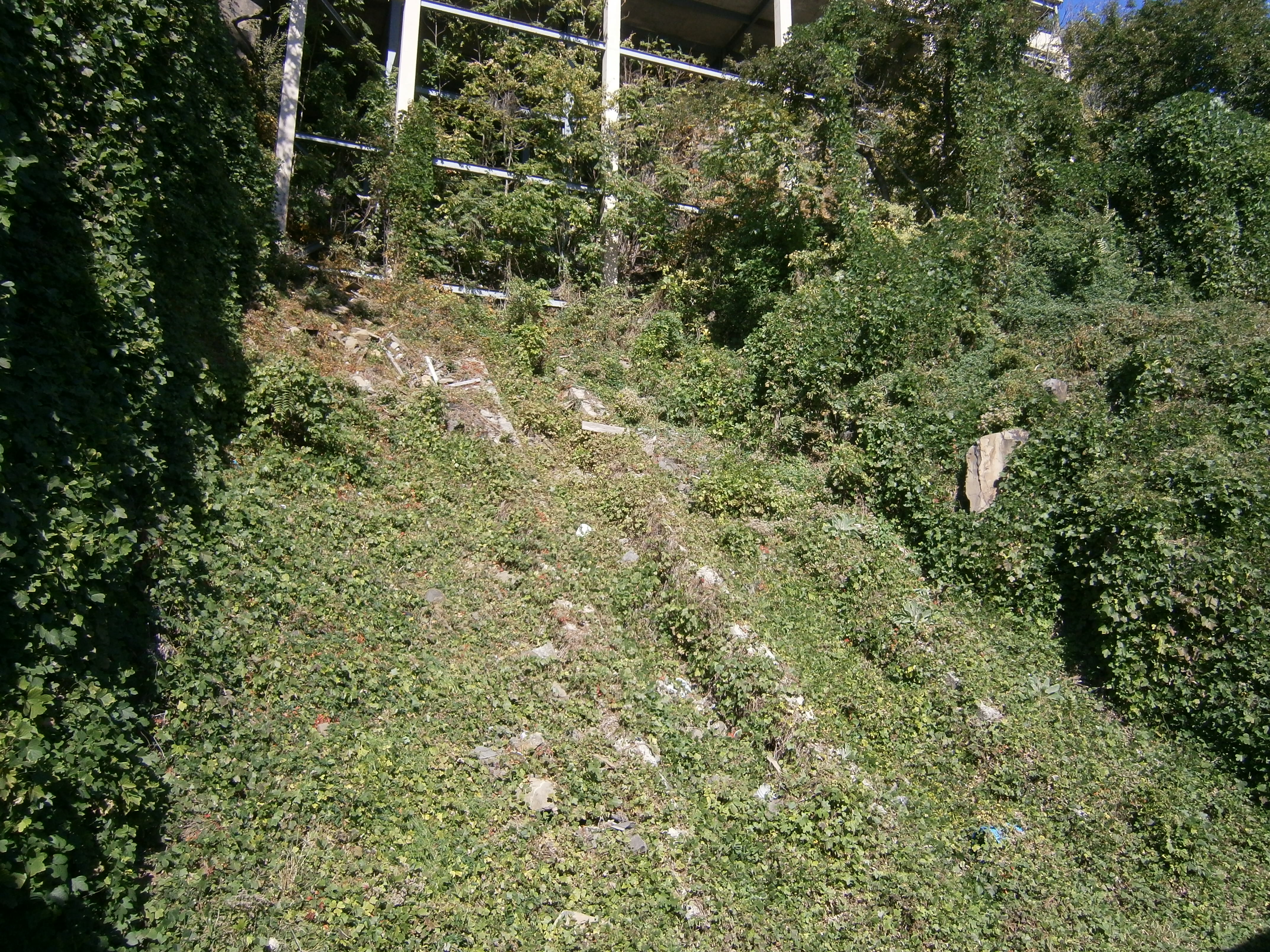
Site of the Weehawken Wagon Lift

Two funicular wagon lifts were built in 1893. The Hoboken lift travelled from near the foot of Paterson Plank Road to Ferry Street, next to Pohlmann's Hall in Jersey City Heights. The Weehawken lift ascended from the foot of Hackensack Plank Road to West Hoboken (now Union City). The remnants of the lift ascend to under Troy Tower, a residential high rise.

== Hoboken Elevated ==
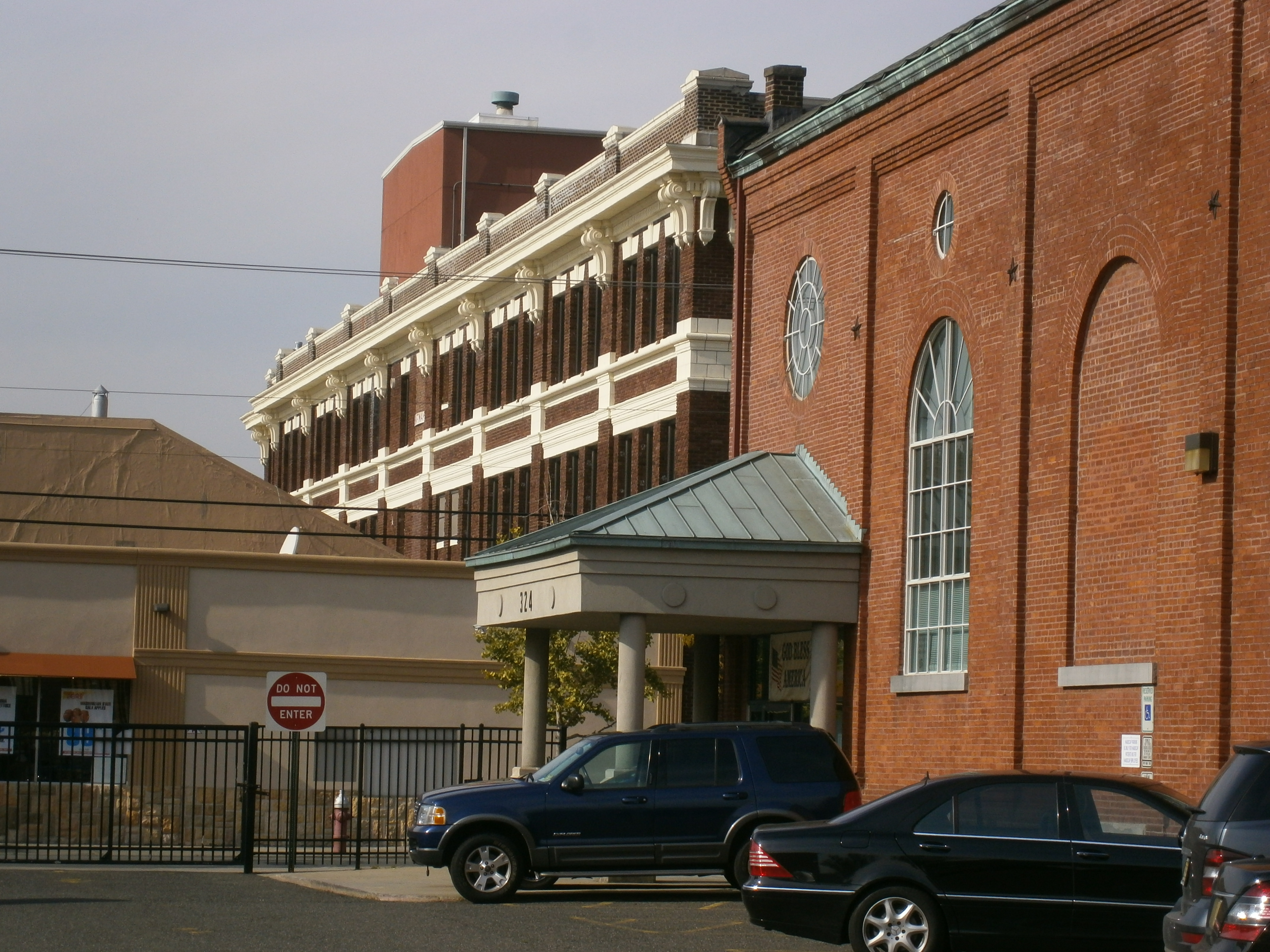
View toward Palisade Ave at Ferry Street in Jersey City Heights showing a former trolley house (right, now offices), station house (left, now a supermarket), and former PSE&G building (center, now residences called Trolley House)

The Hoboken Elevated was a long elevated railway trestle that ran from Hudson Place near the Lackawanna Terminal, up to Jersey City Heights next to the wagon lift at Pohlmann's Hall. The line continued west over private property to Central Avenue and then south over that avenue to the Hudson County Courthouse on Newark Avenue near Journal Square. The portion from Hoboken Terminal to Palisade Avenue opened January 25, 1886, under cable power. The extension to Newark Ave opened June 19, 1892, with electric cars, passengers changing at Palisade Avenue. Through electric service began in December 1892. Within the next few years North Hudson's streetcar lines were converted to electric trolley operation, and ramps were constructed at Palisade Avenue and Newark Avenue so that trolleys could go up onto the elevated railway. It was then operated by trolleys until it closed in 1949.

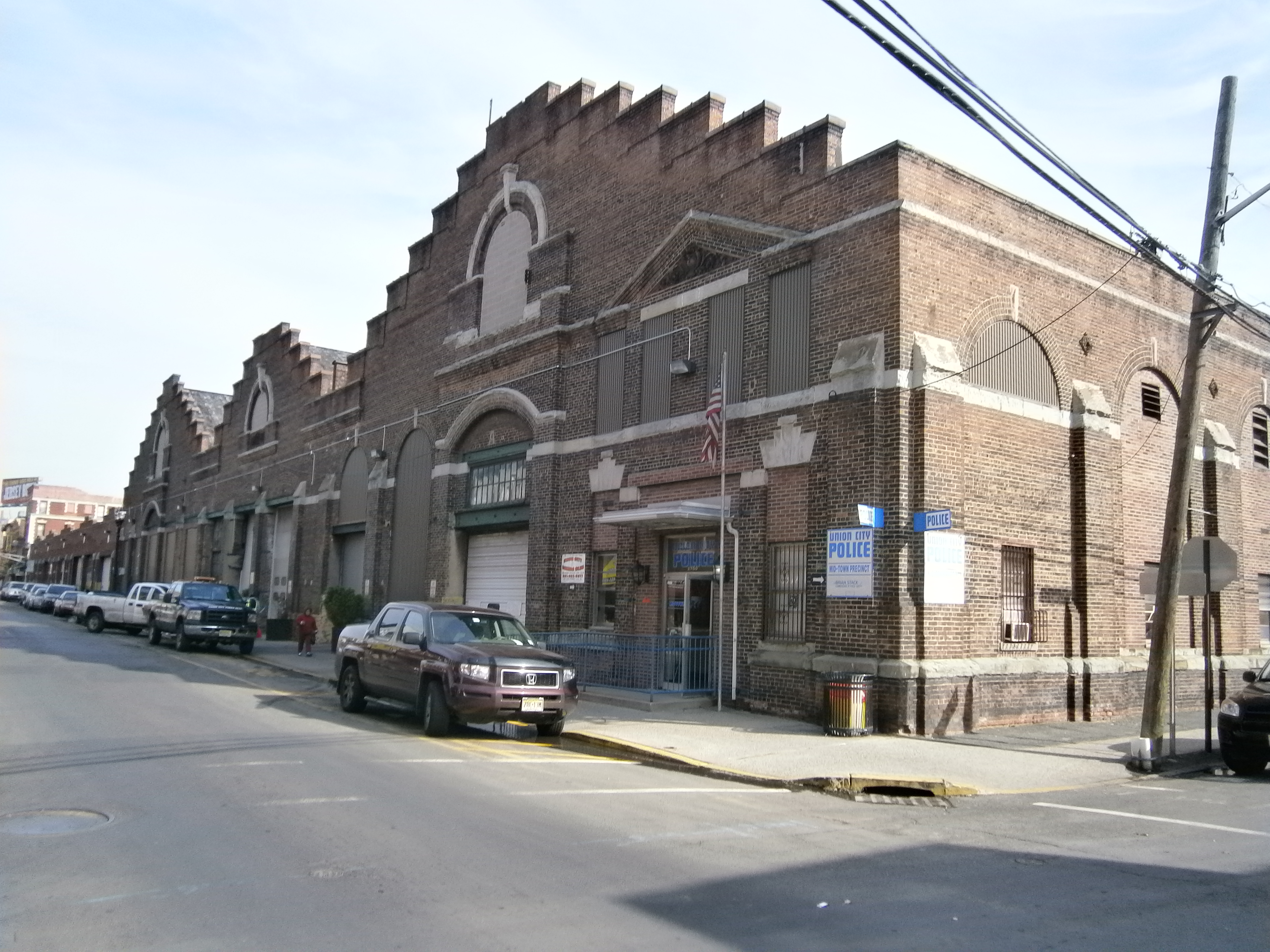
Trolley house on Bergenline Avenue in Union City, now the headquarters of its Department of Public Works, and its Midtown police station

== Eldorado Elevator ==
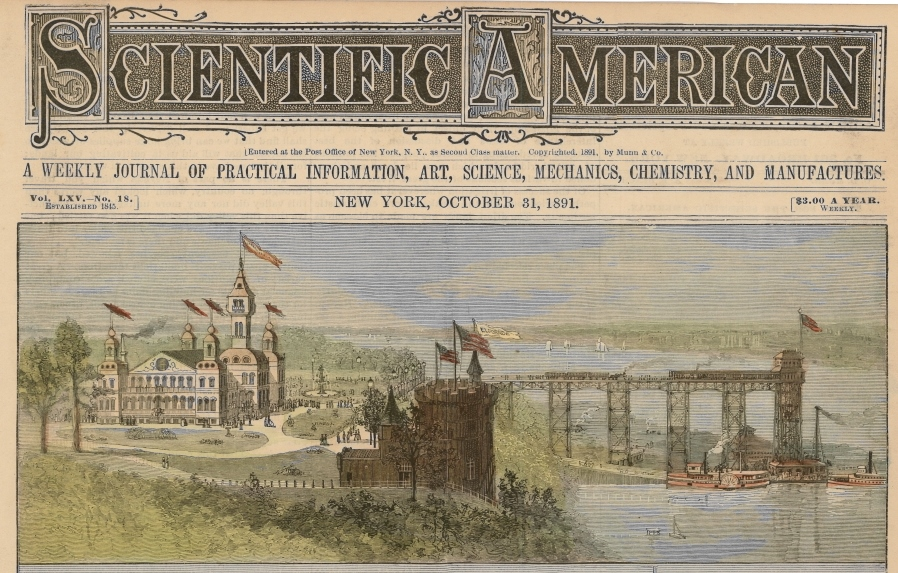

The Eldorado Elevator rose from the West Shore Ferry Terminal at Weehawken to meet the streetcar line that travelled along a trestle to a cut in the Palisades which ran parallel to the Eldorado, a pleasure garden, and then proceeded east and north to the Nungesser's Guttenberg Racetrack.

== Hillside Line ==
From 14th Street in Hoboken, the line ran west and with a series of trestles and horseshoe curves ascended the Palisades to West Hoboken and beyond. Part of the system near 14th Street's Wing Viaduct is a New Jersey Register of Historic Places-designated place.

== See also ==
- Fairview Quarry
- List of funicular railways
- List of New Jersey street railroads
