= Mountain Pavilion =

Inn in New Jersey

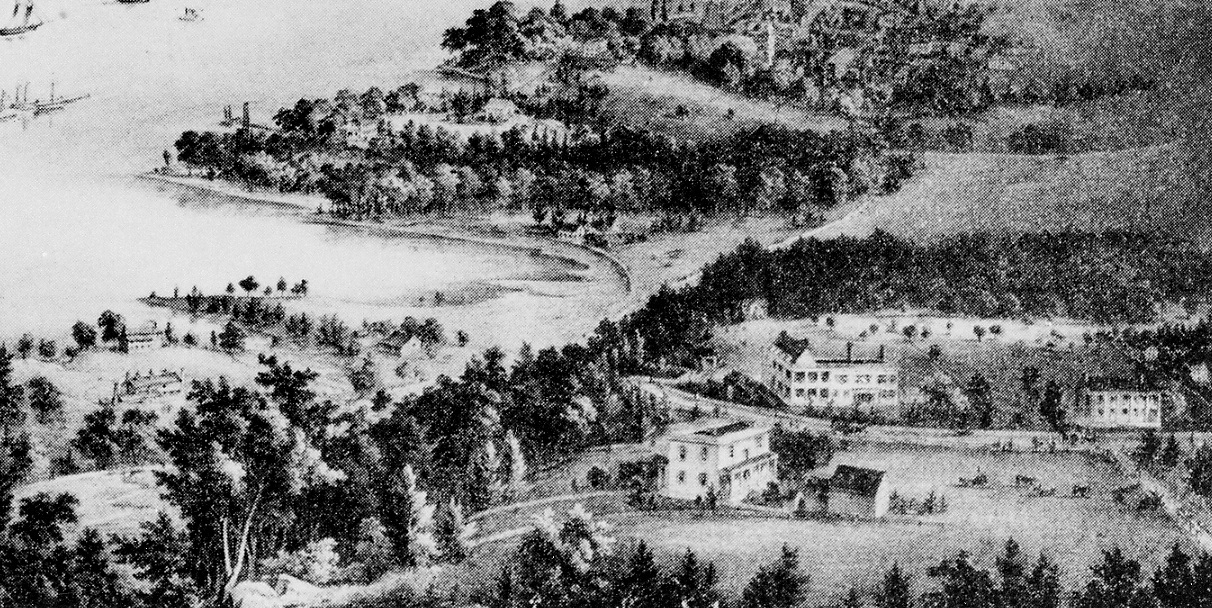
- 1853 sketch of the pavilion property looking southeast to Weehawken Cove
- Interactive map of Mountain Pavilion
- Location: Hackensack Plank Road; Weehawken Heights, New Jersey
- Coordinates: 40°45′58″N 74°01′28″W
- Elevation: 250 feet (76 m)

The Mountain Pavilion was an inn located in Weehawken, New Jersey during the 19th century.

== Location ==
The Mountain Pavilion was situated atop The Palisades along Hackensack Road, offering panoramic views the Hudson River, Upper New York Bay, and Manhattan Island. Fitz-Greene Halleck received inspiration for his poem Fanny, satirizing New York society. The location is in the vicinity of Shippen Street in the neighbourhood now known as Weehawken Heights. The hostelry was opened in the mid-1830s when the region was still part of Bergen Township. At the time, Weehawken was home to numerous estates, many of which began as summer retreats for prominent businessmen, among them that of James Gore King and John Stevens. These early families and their homes are recalled in many odonyms seen in the street names in the area, such as Hauxhurst, Clifton, Duer, Brown, Gregory, Ridgely and Bonn. The Pavilion was accessible from ferry to Hoboken and a two-mile carriage trip up the cliffs.

== Description ==
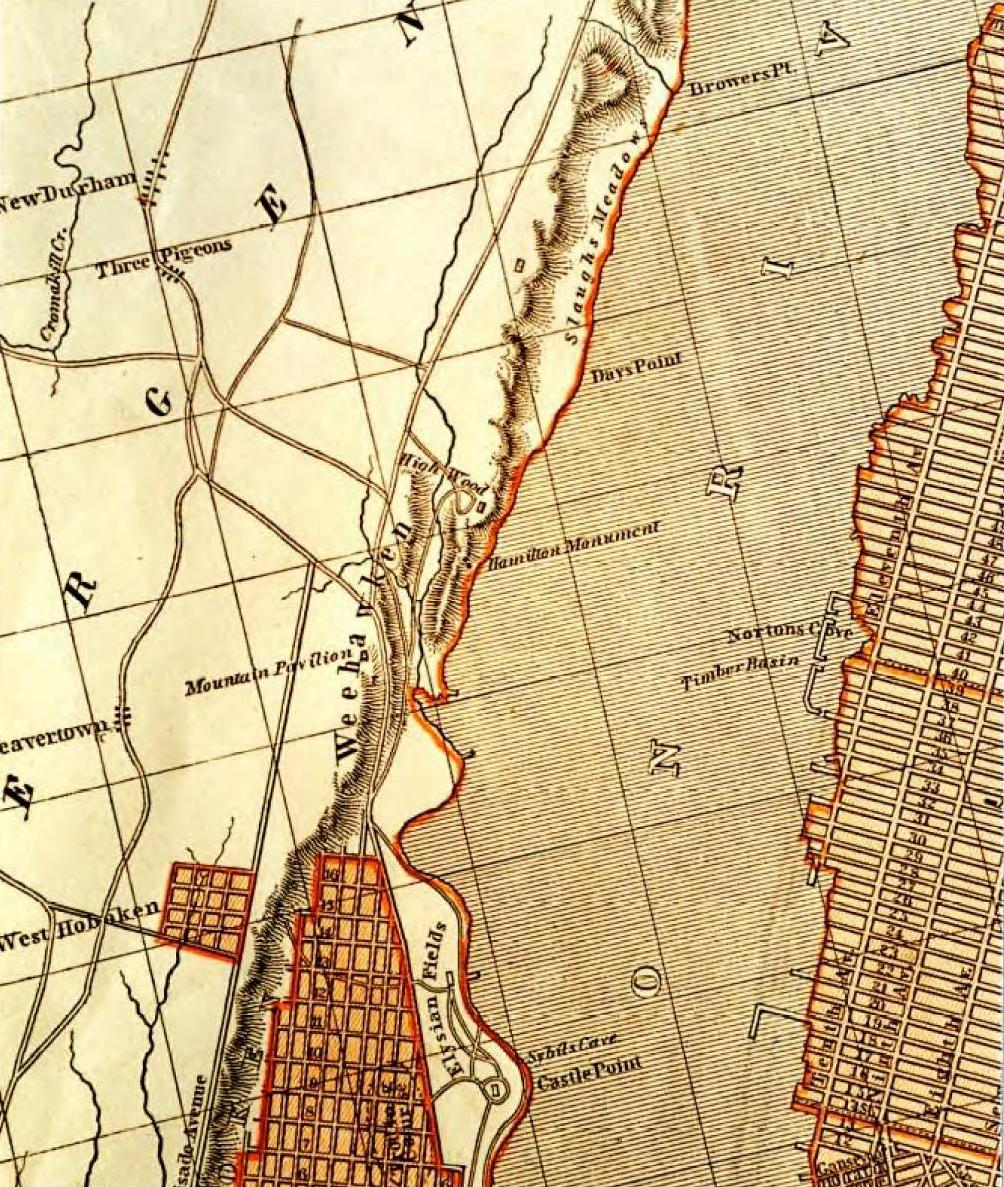
An 1841 map showing the Hoboken Land and Improvement Company, Mountain Pavilion, Highwood Estate, and Castle Point

There are numerous historical references to the area and the allure garnered, e.g. "....Mountain Pavilion, as it was called, at the top of the Hackensack Road, aka Hackensack Plank Road where Daniel Webster sometimes boarded in the summer-time, “to live in heaven,” as he used to declare. That was quite a fashionable hostelry in its day, and greatly frequented by the wealthy residents of New York, who came there to enjoy the air and the view" . The establishment was kept by Colonel Jessup, who according to The Knickerbocker despite being declared incurable by doctors recovered from his lung illness.
