= Shippen Street (Weehawken) =

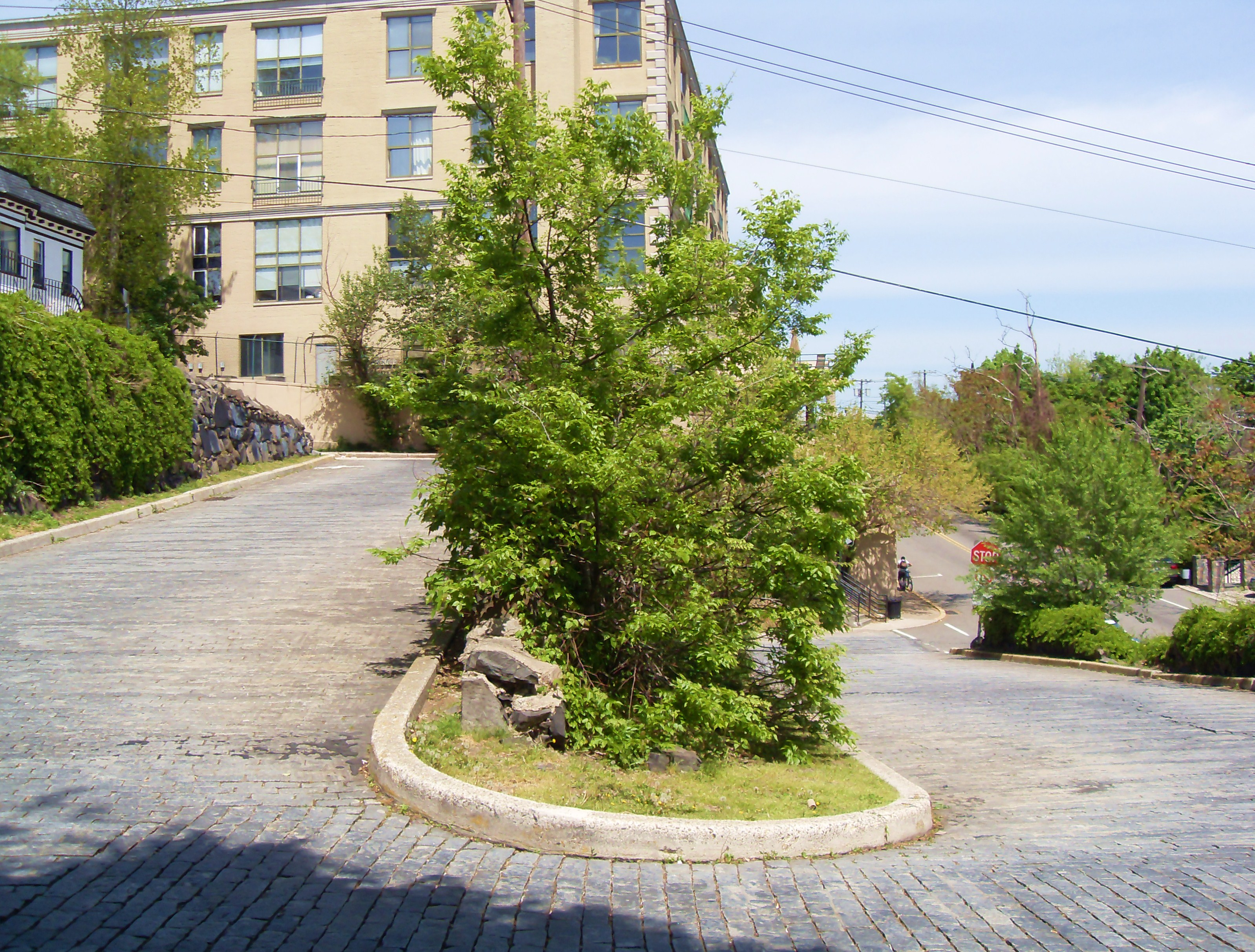
- The second hairpin turn on Shippen Street
- Part of: CR 682
- Namesake: William W. Shippen
- Owner: Township of Weehawken
- Maintained by: Weehawken Public Works
- Length: 0.32 mi (0.51 km)
- Location: Weehawken
- Coordinates: 40°45′54″N 74°01′32″W
- West end: CR 685 (Palisade Avenue) in Weehawken
- East end: CR 691 (Hackensack Plank Road) in Weehawken
- North: Dodd Street
- South: Oak Street

Shippen Street is an east-west street in Weehawken, New Jersey. The eastern terminal, a cobblestone double hairpin turn is listed on the New Jersey Register of Historic Places. Shippen Street was developed at the start of the 20th century as part of the Weehawken Heights, one of the town's residential neighborhoods.

== Route description ==
At its western end, Shippen Street begins at Palisade Avenue, where over the city line in Union City it is now known as 24th Street, and creates the northern border for Elsworth Park, a city square from the 19th century. The two-way street gradually descends as it is intersected first by northbound Hudson Avenue and then southbound Gregory Avenue. At its eastern end, the street provides a view of the Lincoln Tunnel Helix and, directly across the North River, of the Empire State Building and New York Skyline. Shippen Street then becomes an eastbound one-way street that ends at Hackensack Plank Road. In its entirety, the street is about 1690 feet.

== History ==
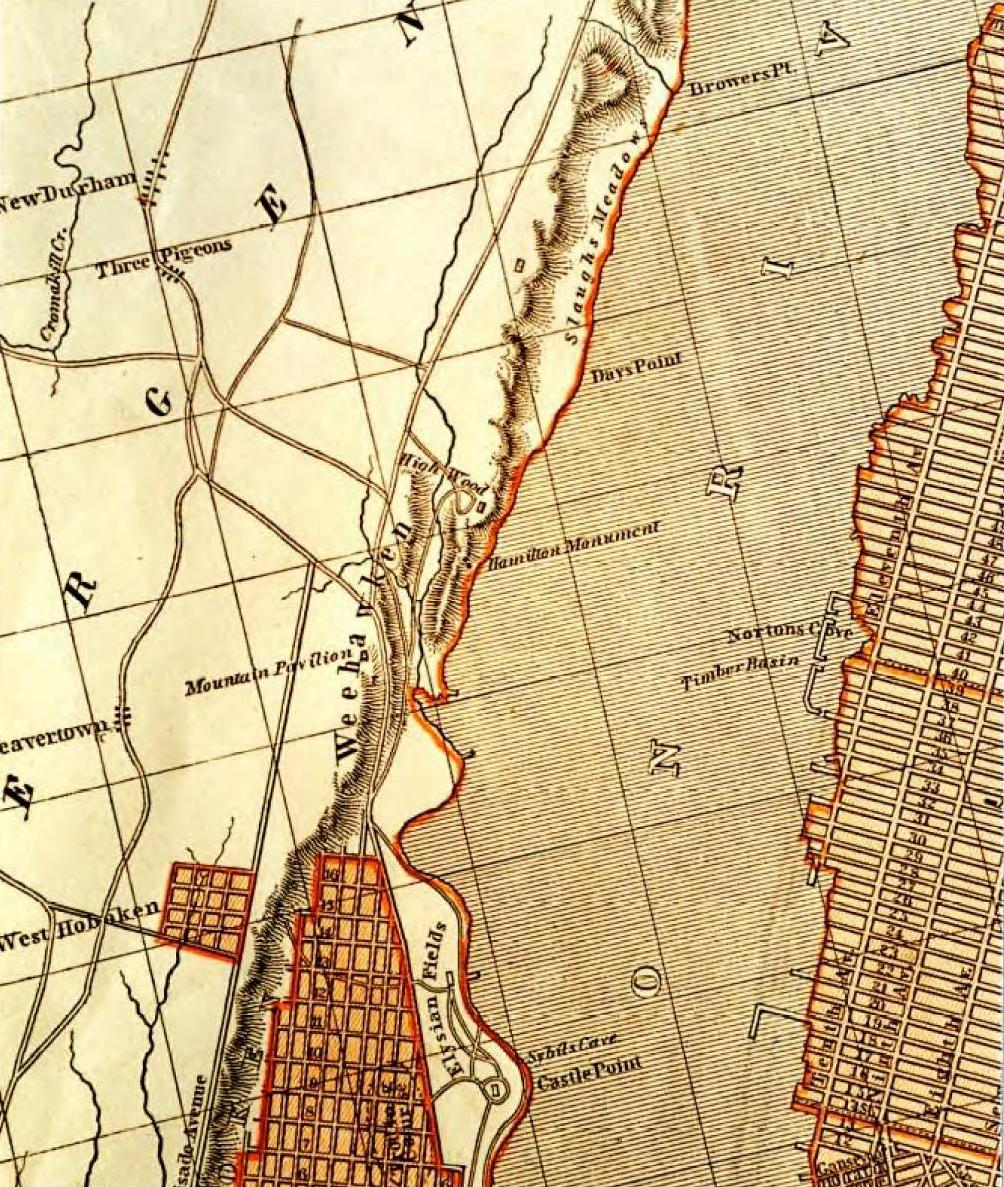
An 1841 map showing the Hoboken Land and Improvement Company holdings. Weehawken Heights was the site of Mountain Pavilion (center)

Shippen Street was named after William W. Shippen, who owned large properties in Weehawken Heights next to those in West Hoboken belonging to the Hoboken Land and Improvement Company, of which he was the president for 21 years. A prominent German immigrant population in the area during the late 19th century included large groups of anarchists; several saloons could be found in the Union Hill area. The largest assembly hall, The New Casino, was on Shippen Street. Although it now ends at Palisades, in the past the name Shippen Street was used at least as far as Central Avenue, where it was once proposed by the city government and townspeople to repurpose a 200-foot shaft used to build the railroad tunnels as a station stop that would provide North Hudson's then-130,000 residents within a 1-mile radius of the shaft with transportation to the Pennsylvania Station being constructed in Manhattan. In 1904, the Geological Society surveyed the area, but ultimately no stop was made on Shippen Street. A few years later in 1907, 125 men working in the North River Tunnels were forced to evacuate through the Shippen Street opening when tar paper used for waterproofing caught fire. Eleven men were unaccounted for upon the initial count; they were found 500 feet from the shaft at Shippen alive but unconscious, and had apparently survived by inhaling oxygen through a compressed air pipe which they hacked through. Although some were hospitalized with serious injury, none were reported dead.

== Double hairpin ==
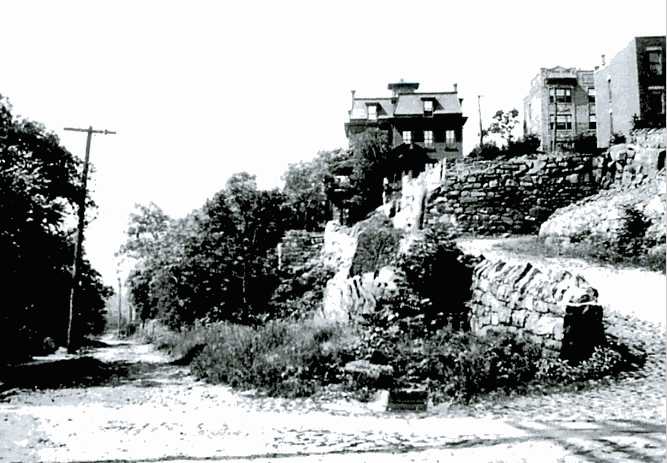
Shippen Street hairpin photograph from early 20th century; the cobblestone street and trap rock walls remain in good condition.

At the eastern end of Shippen Street a double hairpin road begins, connecting the steep grade from Shippen Street to Hackensack Plank Road. It has been called "The Horseshoe" and "Lombard Street of the East Coast". With Hackensack Plank Road already in decades worth of usage and regularity and Shippen Street residential properties extending to the edge of the cliff side, transportation planners and engineers were left little option to connect the two street other than creating a hairpin style turn portion, whereas a perpendicular intersection between the two roads would have created too great of a slope gradient for pedestrians, carriages or automobiles to traverse safely. It was placed on the New Jersey Register of Historic Places on December 8, 1997 under its list of historic preservation sites.

Entering the turns first require a 90° turn where the road remains paved with concrete. The road becomes cobblestone after the second turn, a 180° turn. The third turn, also a 180° turn, is housed completely by the original stone wall. Finally, the last turn is out onto Hackensack Plank Road which if going southbound, requires another 180° turn and ends the cobblestone portion of the street. The one-way hairpin road is about 440 ft. when traveled along the centerline path.

At the north side is a staircase connecting the upper and lower ends of the hairpins, which allows pedestrians to avoid the walk where there are no sidewalks. Both sets of stairs accommodated many workers commuting to the factories on Gregory Avenue. The buildings overlooking the Horseshoe, as it has always been known by the locals, was the factory of S. Blickman & Co. which operated a stainless steel fabricating plant at the site for about 70 years. The plant produced stainless steel for many industrial and commercial purposes and was oriented to outfitting the many ships built along the Hoboken waterfront in Todd Shipyards (the family of former Governor Christy Todd Whitman) and Bethlehem Steel Shipyards. It produced most of the stainless steel equipment used to outfit Naval vessels constructed on the East coast during the Second World War. Blickman outgrew the factory and eventually the disused building was converted to condominiums in the 1980s. Farther down the street on the corner of Gregory and Hackensack Plank Road was the factory of Robert Reiner & Co. which imported and customized Swiss embroidery machines when Hudson County was the center of the embroidery industry in the US in the first half of the 20th century. During the time of their operation Shippen Street was the only local street capable of accommodating the turn of many large tractor trailer trucks which served these two large and active factories. Delivering truck size rolls of stainless steel and carrying away the often huge finished products fit for outfitting large ships. No parking was permitted on Gregory Avenue until the factories both ceased operation.

== Shippen Steps ==
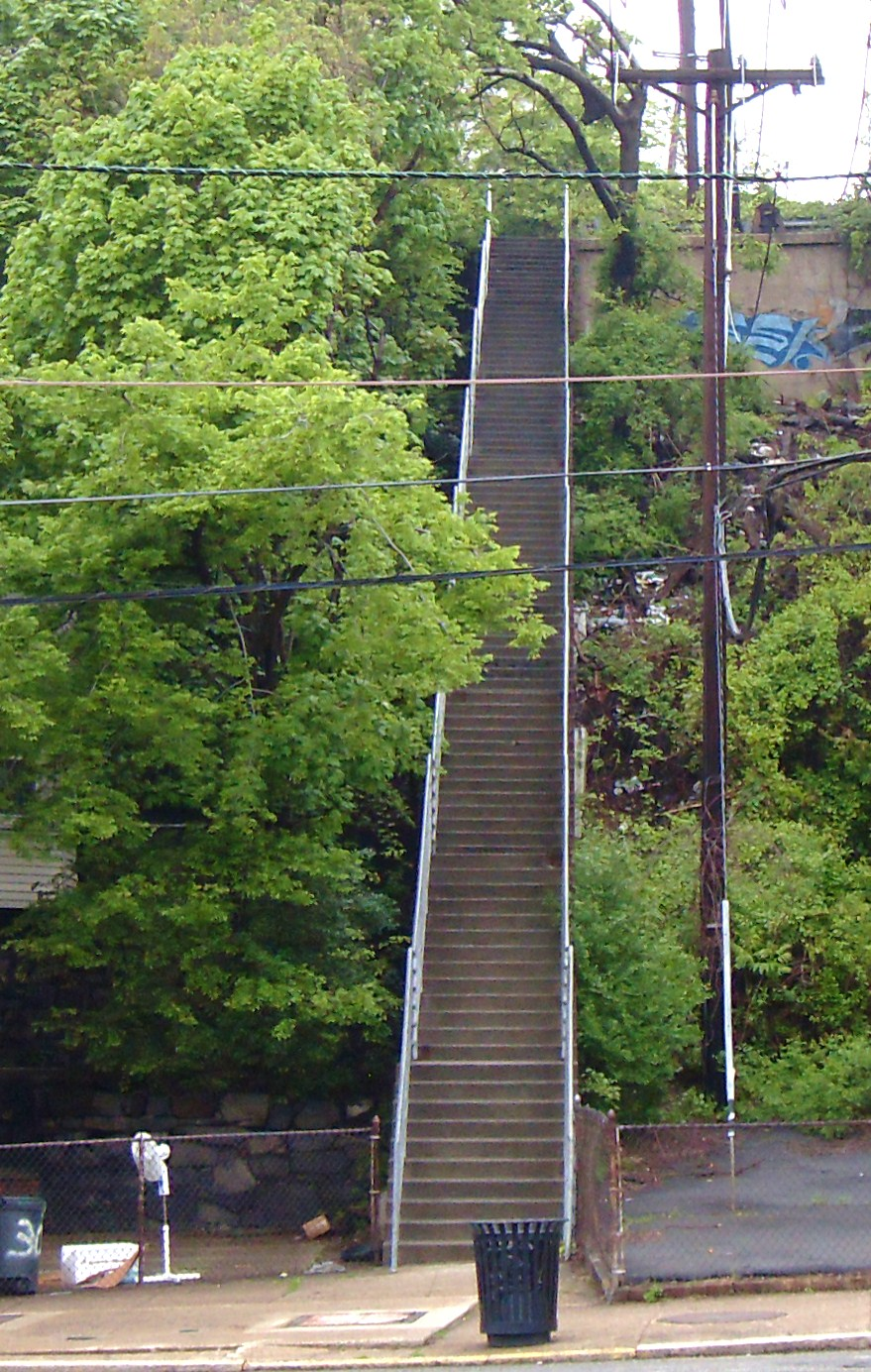

At the end of Shippen Street, directly across from the double hairpin curve are the Shippen Steps, an outdoor public staircase down the Palisades Cliffs which continues in the same direction as Shippen Street. They begin on Hackensack Plank road and end at Park Avenue. There are 96 steps, with a diagonal span in length of about 250 feet. In the past, the steps provided townspeople with access to Weehawken's original town hall, as well as the old police station, which was headquarter in the building at 309 Park Avenue. It was built in 1890, and the first floor features a jail cell where police operations occurred. The building was last used as the VFW post 1923 meeting place. In 2009, the town decided to renovate the building, which became the Weehawken Historical Society Museum. Across the street at the bottom of the steps is the granite wall which overlooks the art deco Lincoln Tunnel entrance. The Shippen steps have even been regarded as the haunted "Steps of Weehawken". In the mid-to-late 19th century, a pregnant woman fell down the steps, losing both her life and her child's, and in 1898, it was reported that a Shippen Street resident committed suicide at the head of the steps.

== Transportation ==
New Jersey Transit Bus Route 123 makes a stop at the top of Shippen Street along Palisade Avenue, and runs between the Port Authority Bus Terminal and Christ Hospital in Jersey City Heights. a few blocks to the south is the Marginal Highway, a main transit corridor for North Hudson-Lincoln Tunnel traffic. On the other side, the Shippen Stairs end about .25 mi. from the Hudson Bergen Light Rail Lincoln Harbor Station and New York Waterway ferries, though pedestrian access requires a detour around the tunnel's toll plaza.

== Gallery ==
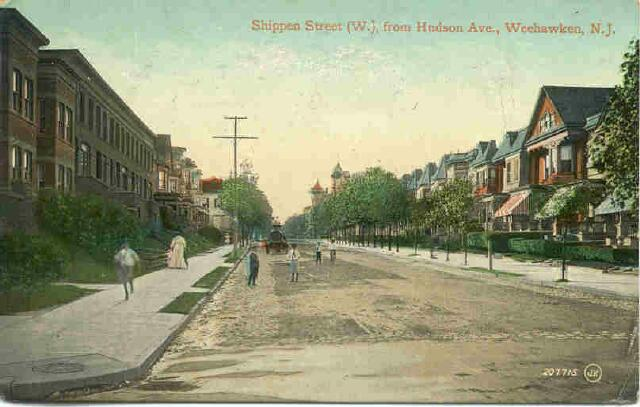
A c. 1900 postcard facing west toward Palisade Avenue of Shippen Street

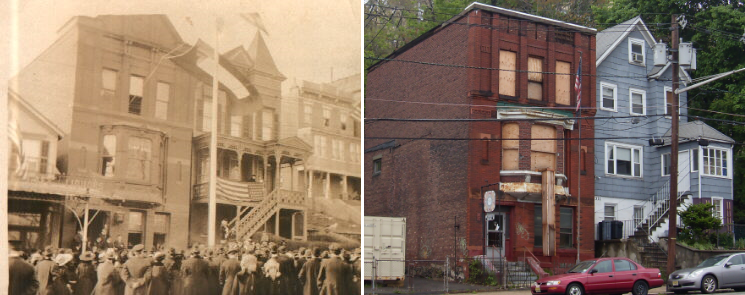
The city's old town hall, just north of the Shippen Stairs, c. 19th century and in 2010

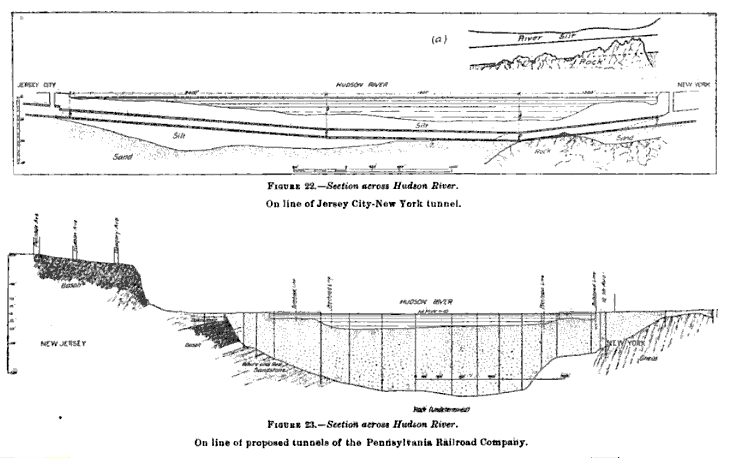
Geological Societies proposal to build tunnel across Hudson. In Figure 23, Shippens' intersections of Palisades, Hudson and Gregory can be seen

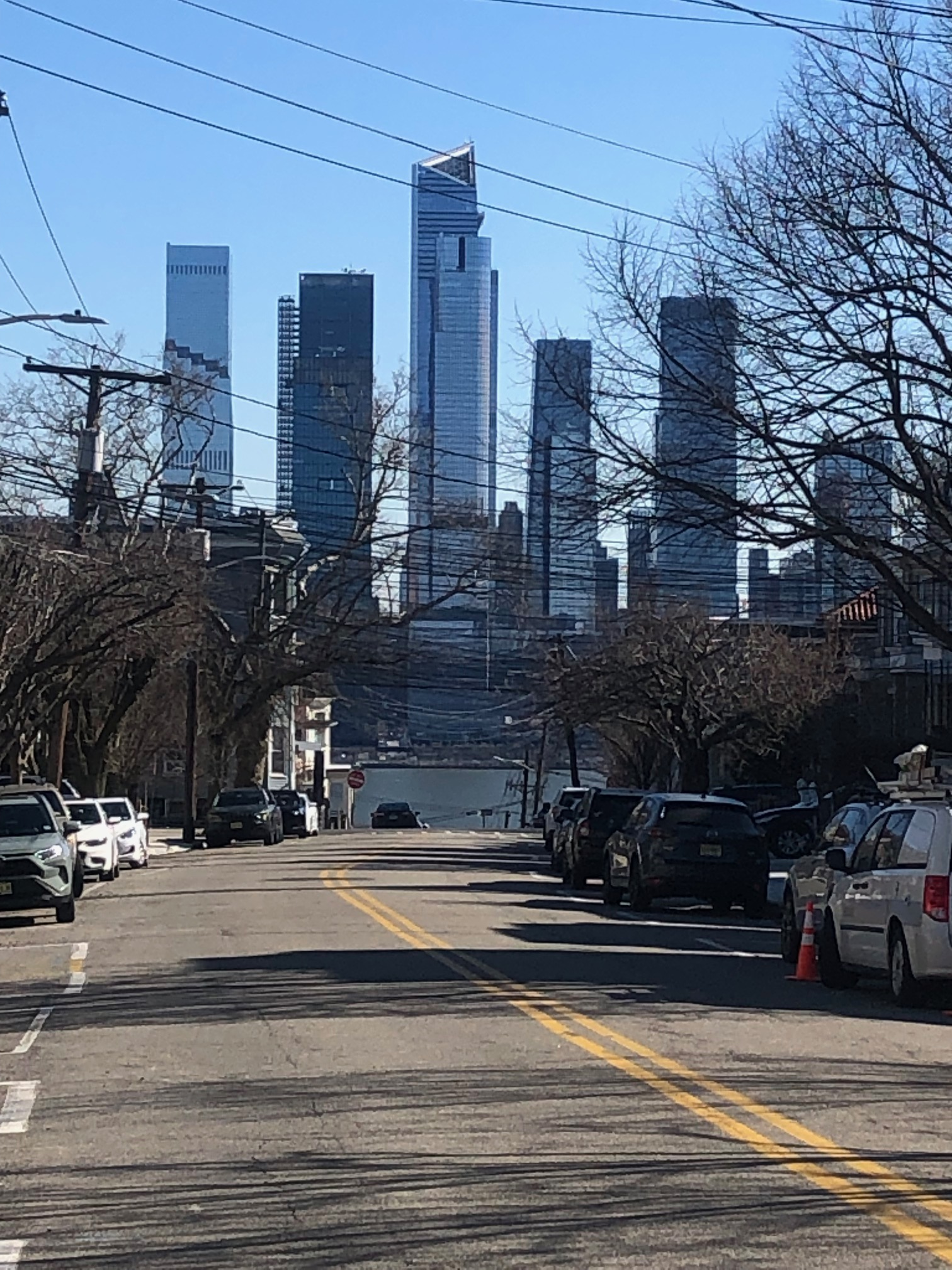
Hudson Yards in Manhattan seen looking down Shippen Street

== See also ==
- Historic districts in Hudson County, New Jersey
- Mountain Road: A single hairpin turn road at Paterson Plank Road between Jersey City Heights and Hoboken
- Boulevard East
- Pershing Road (Weehawken)
- Wing Viaduct
- Gorge Road (Hudson Palisades)
