= Palisade Avenue (Hudson Palisades) =

Road in New Jersey, United States

- Palisade Avenue highlighted in red

Route information
- Component highways: CR 685; CR 719; CR 27; Route 5; Route 67

Southern segment
- South end: CR 639 in Jersey City
- Major intersections: Route 139 in Jersey City
- North end: 79th Street in North Bergen

Northern segment
- South end: CR 693 in North Bergen
- Major intersections: Route 5 in Fort Lee; Route 67 in Fort Lee
- North end: I-95 / US 1-9 / US 46 / CR 505 in Fort Lee

Location
- Country: United States
- State: New Jersey

Highway system
- New Jersey State Highway Routes; Interstate; US; State; Scenic Byways

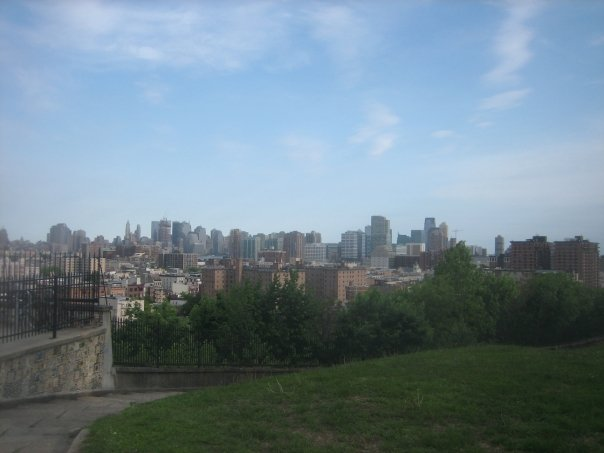
Riverview-Fiske Park

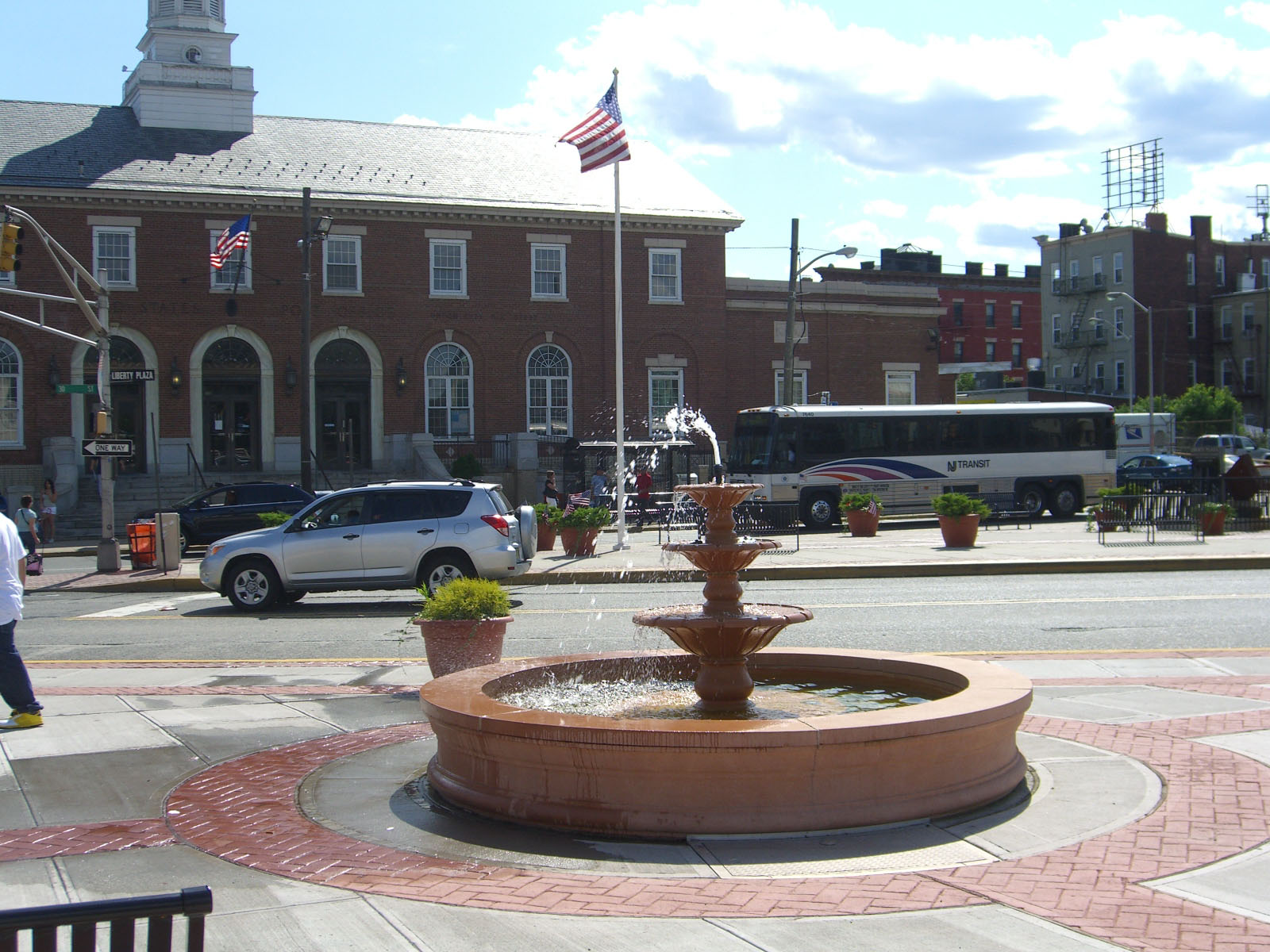
The intersection at Main Post Office and Liberty Plaza in Union City is a major bus stop, with thousands of boardings daily.

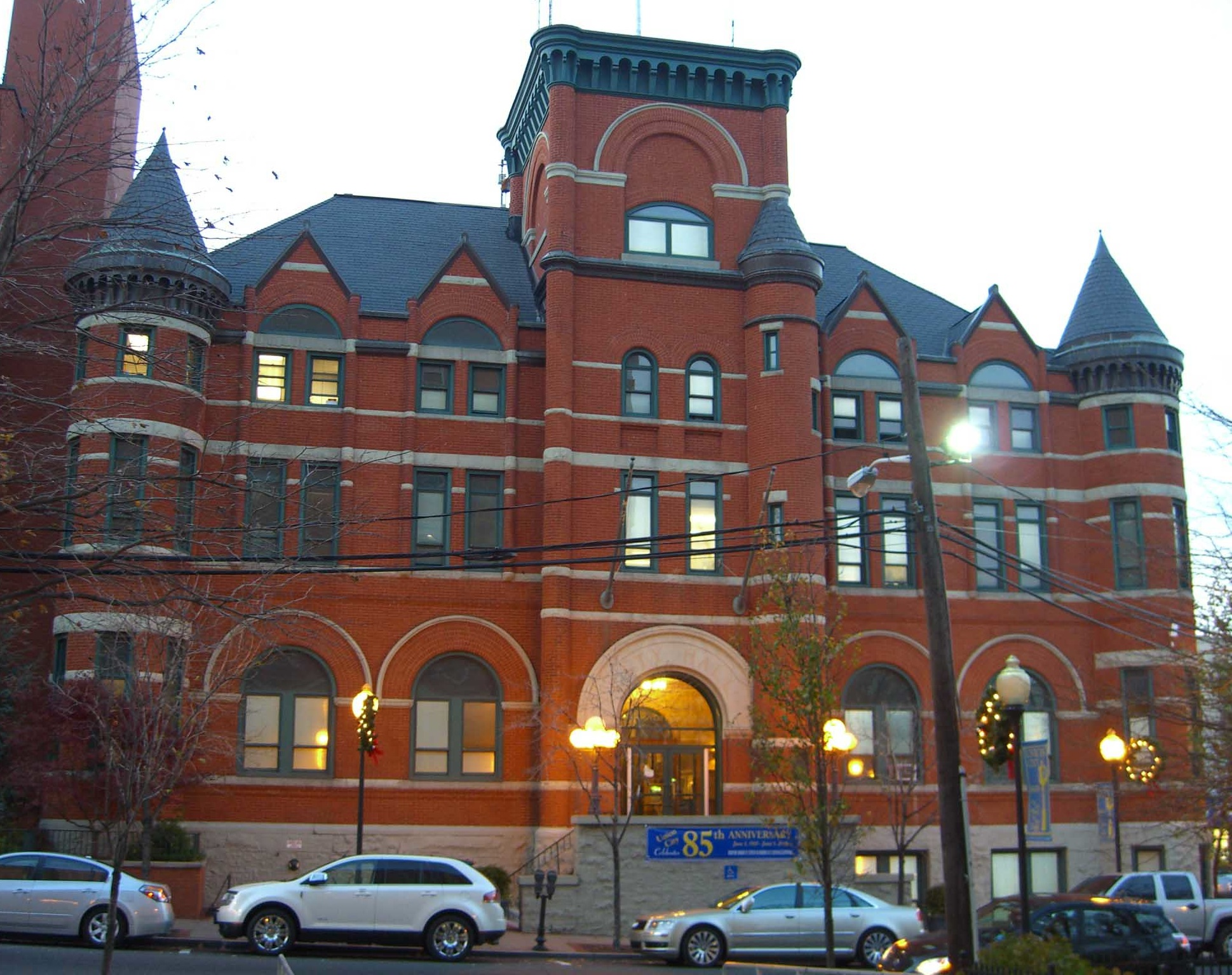
Union City City Hall

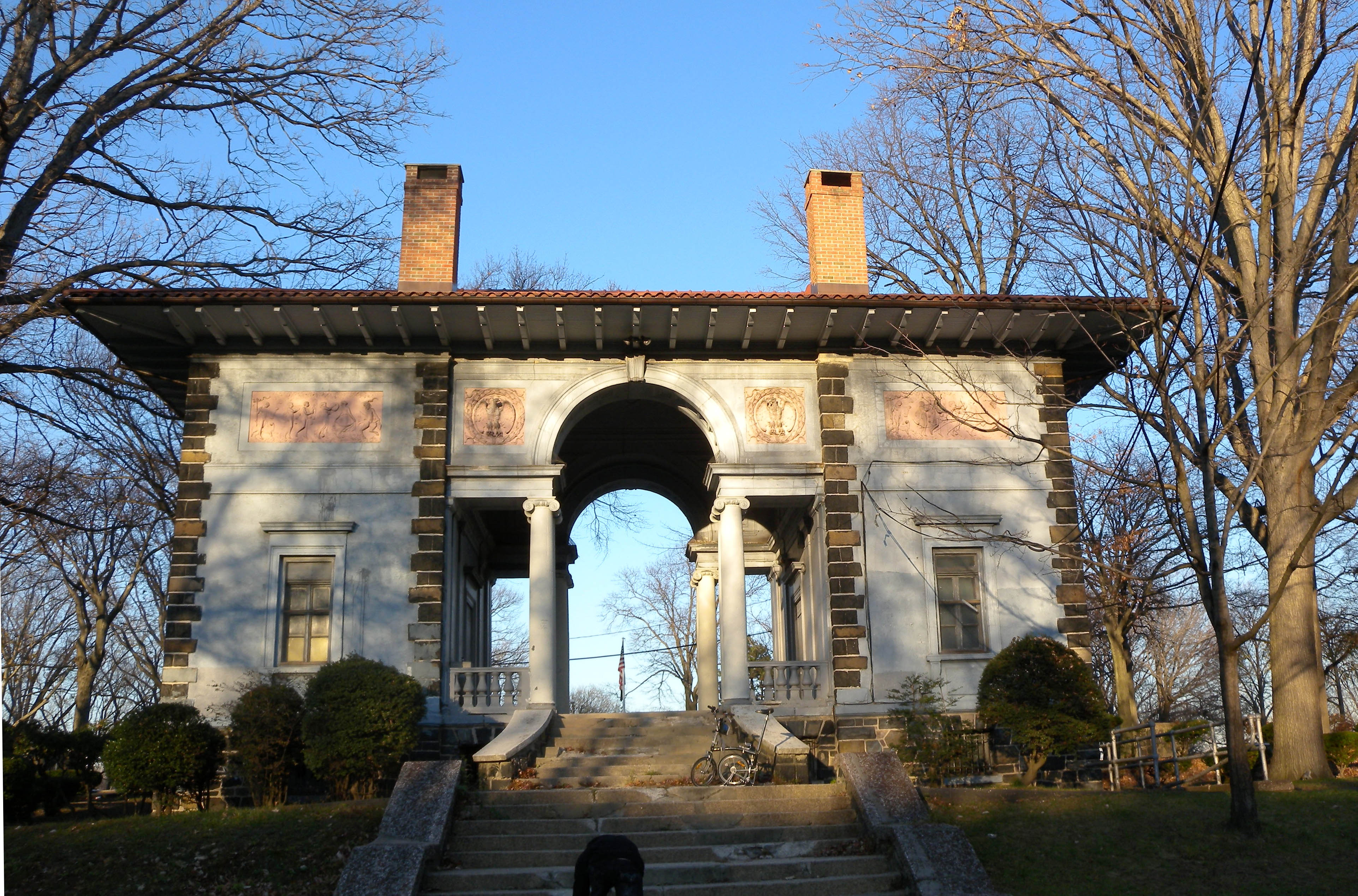
North Hudson Park

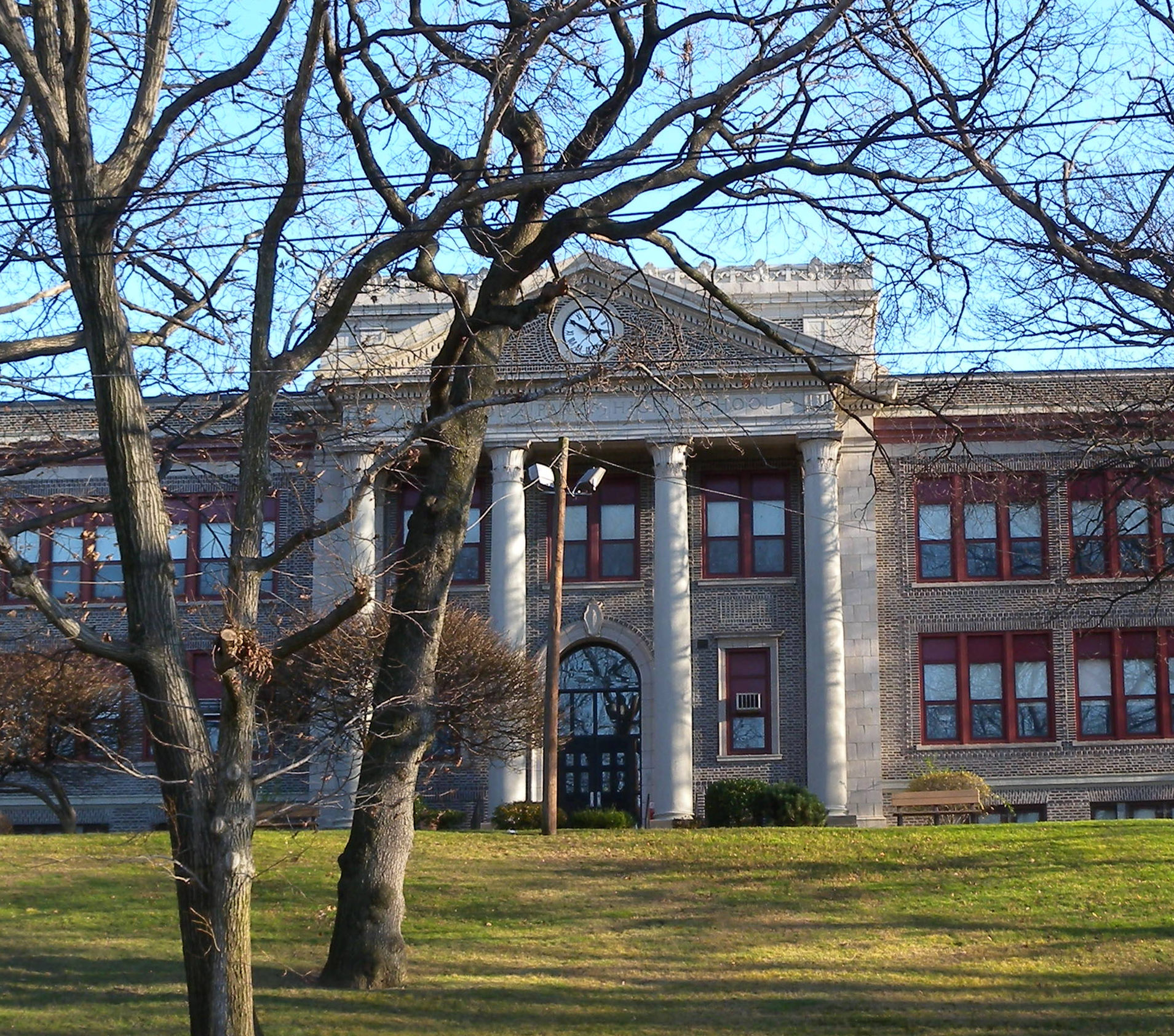
Cliffside Park High School

Palisade Avenue is the name given to a historic road which parallels the eastern crest of Hudson Palisades in northeastern New Jersey. It travels between Jersey City and Fort Lee, passing through Jersey City Heights, North Hudson, and Cliffside Park, with various parts carrying Hudson and Bergen county route designations. The avenue re-aligns itself at several places along its route as it crosses traditional municipal boundaries created in the 19th century. As a primary route running along the top of the Hudson Palisades, many segments offer scenic views of the Hudson River and the New York skyline. Since 2020 there is proposed state legislation to restrict building heights that would rise above the cliffs on the eastern side of Palisade Avenue along the entire corridor from Jersey City to Fort Lee.

== Route description ==
The southern end of Palisade Avenue begins at Newark Avenue, just east of the Hudson County Courthouse, running between the historic Jersey City High School and the 1942 Hudson Gardens Housing project. It soon crosses over Bergen Arches and Long Dock Tunnel, (both of which served the Erie Railroad's Pavonia Terminal) and the Divided Highway (connecting the Pulaski Skyway and the Holland Tunnel). At this point, the avenue enters Jersey City Heights and passes Christ Hospital.

Upon crossing over a steep natural ravine and a road descending to Hoboken, Palisade Avenue intersects with Ferry Street, likely so named for the connection made possible by the North Hudson County Railway's Wagon Lift and Elevated (the latter used by the Public Service Railway and dismantled in 1947) which transported passengers up and down the cliffs. Two historic office buildings, one formerly PSE&G, and another now used North Hudson Community Action Group are at the intersection, at the end of which is Pohlmann's Hall.

Proceeding north it runs alongside Riverview Park and the top of Holland Street (a former carriage road and one of the few cobbled streets left in Hudson County) connecting to Paterson Plank Road. At 524 is the Van Vorst House a stone farmhouse built in 1742 by the family Van Vorst and considered to be the second oldest standing building in Hudson County. At Congress Street the 9th Street-Congress Street Station of the Hudson Bergen Light Rail is one block to the east connected by an elevator to platforms at the base of the cliff.

Paterson Plank Road, which traverses Washington Park, creates the border between Jersey City and Union City, the southern part of which was at one time called West Hoboken. A Yardley Soap factory recalls the city's manufacturing past. Nearby Firefighters Memorial Park. was built partially as memorial to the September 11 attacks.

As the route passes the Hackensack Water Company Reservoir #2 it creates a border between Union City and Weehawken Heights, passing Ellsworth Park and Shippen Street, until it reaches Lincoln Tunnel Approach, a cut built in conjunction with the tunnel. The Main Post Office at the intersection with marginal road of 495 is a major stop for east-bound buses travelling to Manhattan.

After crossing over the highway and Hackensack Plank Road and entering the northern part of Union City formerly known as Union Hill, the avenue becomes a one lane, one-way street traveling southbound. Union City Town Hall is between 37th and 38th Streets. Just south of the border with West New York at 49th Street the avenue makes an S curve and continues as a one-way southbound street through the municipality. This segment of the route approaches the highest point in Hudson County, New Jersey at 260 feet.

In Guttenberg the avenue once again realigns to the west and becomes a two-way street which continues through the Woodcliff Section of North Bergen, where it meets North Hudson-James J. Braddock Park. The avenue resumes inside the park at Boulevard East, traveling a short distance before crossing the Hudson-Bergen county line, entering Cliffside Park. Taking a more meandering course, the route passes the Cliffside Park Municipal Complex, Cliffside Park Public Library and Cliffside Park High School, then intersects with Gorge Road, one of the few roads along the face of the Hudson Palisades to low-lying areas along the Hudson River waterfront, in this case in Edgewater.

At the northern end of the borough the avenue passes the former site of Palisades Amusement Park, demolished in the 1970s for the construction of high-rise residential complexes. Soon after crossing over the Fort Lee line, Palisade diverges at triangle with Lemoine Avenue, and passes Fort Lee Museum and Monument Park. After crossing Main Street, at the Barrymore Film Center, it passes the Modern highrise complex and ends at GWB Plaza, just west of Palisades Interstate Park and the George Washington Bridge.

== See also ==
- Boulevard East
- Summit Avenue (Hudson Palisades)
- Central Avenue (Hudson Palisades)
