= Fairview Quarry =

Quarry in New Jersey, USA

Coordinates: 40.81250°N 73.99944°W

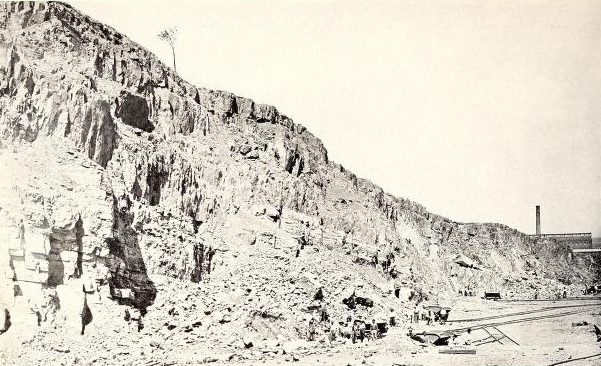
General view of the Quarry at Fairview, 1911

The Fairview Quarry at Fairview, Bergen County, New Jersey was operated around 1910 for several years by the Public Service Railway of New Jersey mainly for the production of track ballast.

== Location and size ==
The quarry was located at The Palisades on the Bergen Turnpike, between West Hoboken and Hackensack. The quarry has been enlarged in 1911 from 1 acre to 25 acres, giving a visible supply of 1,500,000 cu. yd. of trap rock.

== Crushing plant and narrow-gauge railway ==
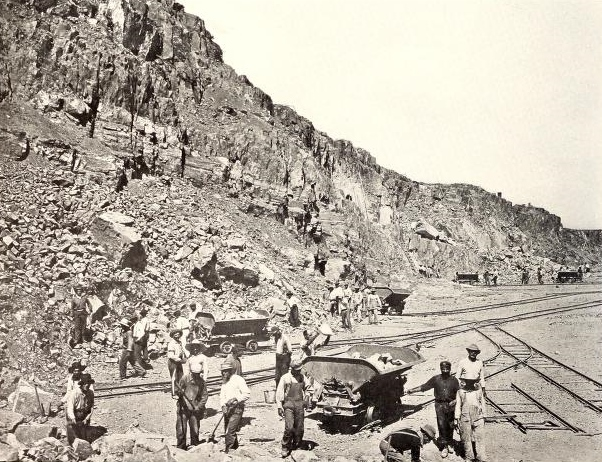
Industrial railway and side-dump cars for transporting rock to the breaker at Fairview Quarry, 1911

The crushing equipment consisted of one No. 4 and two No. 6 Allis-Chalmers crushing plants, which had a combined capacity of 600 cu. yd. a day, which was practically equal to that of the storage bins. The blasted rock was brought to the crusher in narrow-gauge railway cars instead of by horse or oxen teams, as it had been the former practice.

== Unique features ==
One of the interesting features of the plant was that all apparatus, except the air drills, was electrically operated, the combined motor capacity of the crushers and air compressors being about 500 hp. Another interesting feature was the use of manganese steel for the conveyor buckets, and for the inner shelves of the screens. This type of reinforcement has proved very effective in reducing the frequency and total cost of renewals.

The cost of delivering crushed stone from the Fairview quarry alongside of any job within a radius of 20 miles averaged 47 cents per cubic yard, but was lowered to 38 cents per cubic yard by changing to rail-car haulage. Both figures include labour, power, maintenance of line and track equipment and general expenses. The economy was effected by making use of returning empty cars for the distribution of supplies from Passaic Wharf.

The operation of this quarry has proved satisfactory to the Public Service Railway of New Jersey from two important standpoints:

- It has produced a considerable saving over the cost per cubic yard, but more important still, it has eliminated all dependence upon outside quarries.
- Consequently, track work had no longer to be delayed because of the failure of contractors to make deliveries.

It was planned in autumn 1911, to operate the quarry through the winter months, so that plenty of crushed rock would be available for spring operations, and even for sale to outside parties.

The quarry was in charge of a superintendent, who reported to the superintendent of Maintenance of Way. He was assisted by a clerk, a general electrician, a machinist, a dynamo man and a boss driller. About eighty-five men are employed during the busy season.
