= Pohlmann's Hall =

- U.S. National Register of Historic Places
- New Jersey Register of Historic Places
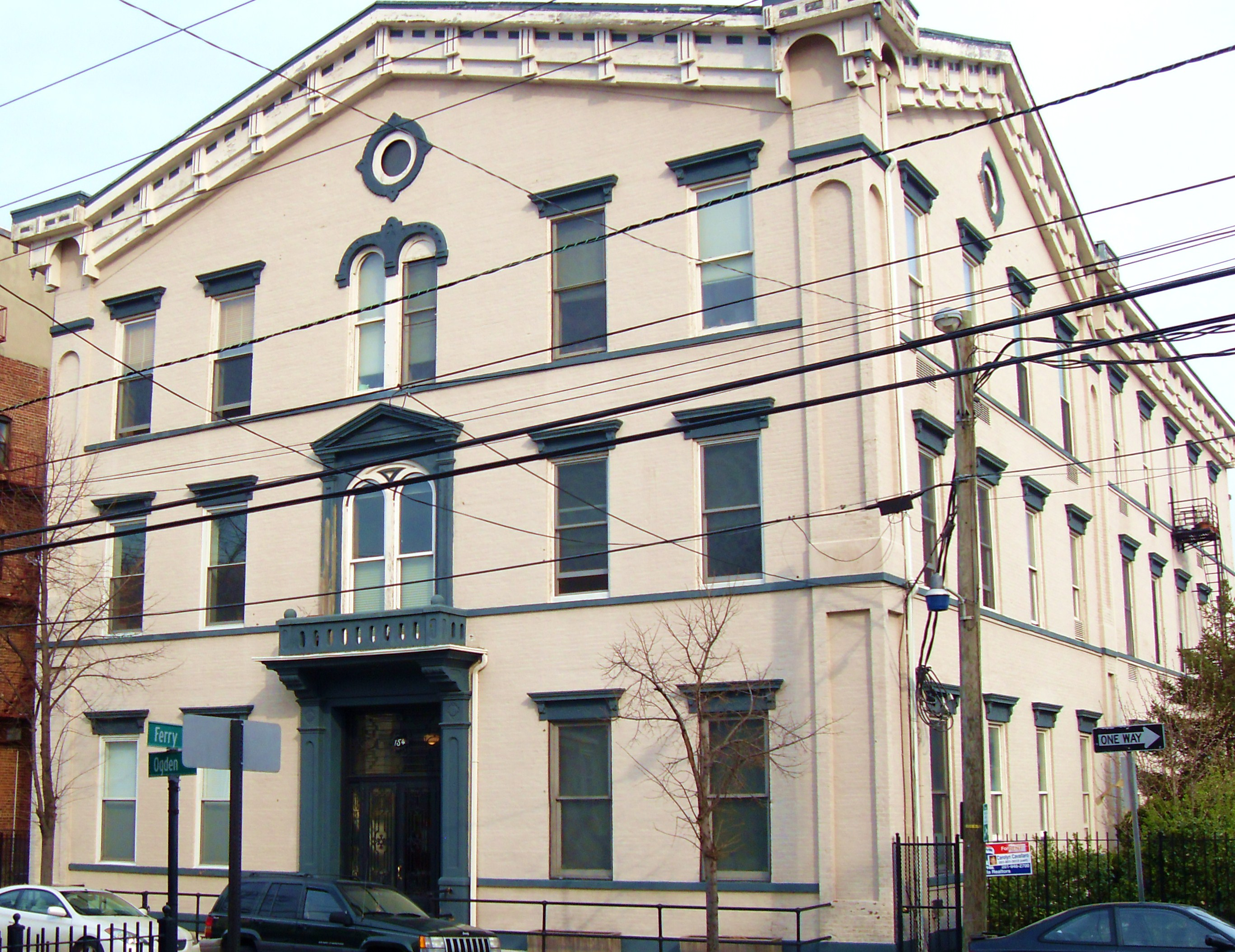

- Location within Hudson County, New Jersey Location within New Jersey Location within the United States
- Location: 154 Ogden Avenue, Jersey City, New Jersey
- Coordinates: 40°44′23″N 74°2′45″W
- Area: 0.4 acres (0.16 ha)
- Built: 1874
- NRHP reference No.: 85002001
- NJRHP No.: 1525

Significant dates
- Added to NRHP: September 5, 1985
- Designated NJRHP: July 9, 1985

Pohlmann's Hall is a building located in Jersey City, Hudson County, New Jersey, United States. The building was added to the National Register of Historic Places on September 5, 1985.

== History ==
The building was built in 1874 by Diedrich Pohlmann and used as an athletic club. In 1918 the building was purchased by L.O. Koven Boiler Company and used as the company's headquarters. In 1963 the building was purchased by J. L. Kessler Company. The building was sold to the present owners in 1984 and converted into condominiums.

== See also ==
- National Register of Historic Places listings in Hudson County, New Jersey
- Schuetzen Park
- Palisade Avenue (Hudson Palisades)
