= The Palisades (Hudson River) =

Steep cliffs along the west side of the lower Hudson River

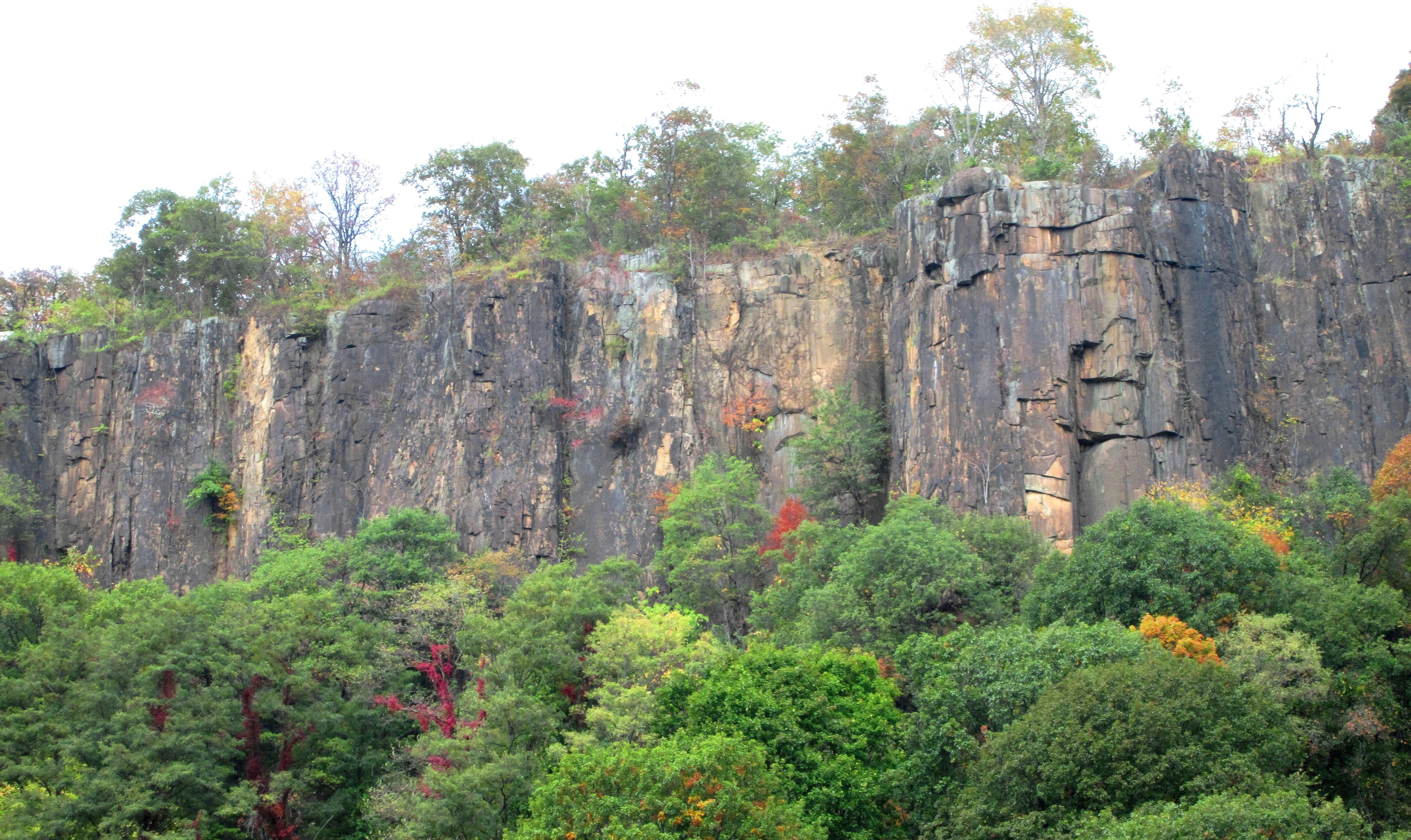
- The cliffs of the Palisades as seen from the Ross Dock Picnic Area in Palisades Interstate Park
- Interactive map of The Palisades
- Location: Northeastern New Jersey (Hudson and Bergen counties); Downstate New York (Rockland County)
- Coordinates: 40.96451°N 73.90859°W

U.S. National Natural Landmark
- Designated: 1983

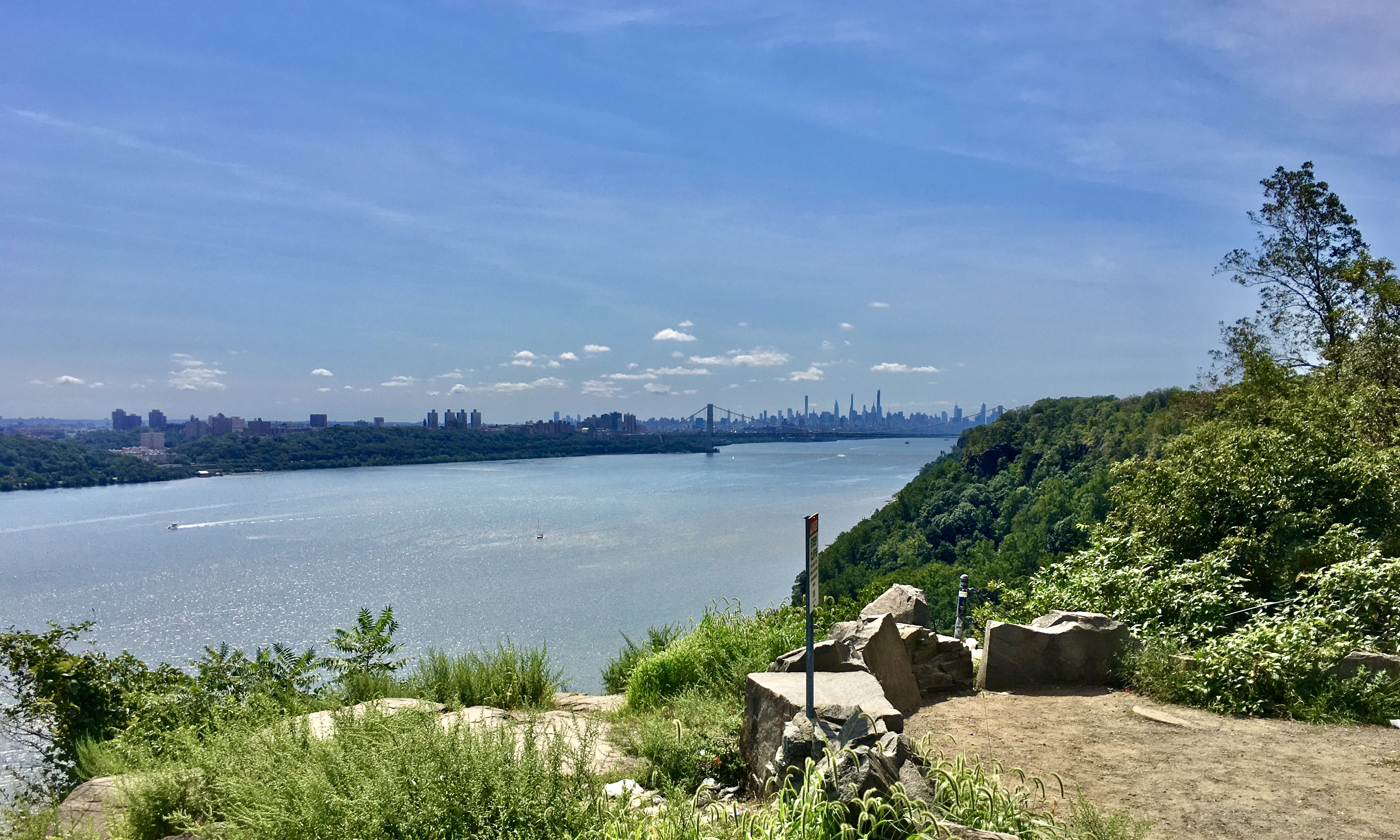
Atop the Hudson Palisades in Englewood Cliffs, New Jersey, overlooking the Hudson River, the George Washington Bridge, and the skyscrapers of Midtown Manhattan, New York City

The Palisades, also called the New Jersey Palisades or the Hudson River Palisades, are a line of steep cliffs along the west side of the lower Hudson River in Northeastern New Jersey and Southeastern New York in the United States. The cliffs stretch north from Jersey City about 20 miles (32 km) to near Nyack, New York, and are visible at Haverstraw, New York. They rise nearly vertically from near the edge of the river, and are about 300 feet (90 m) high at Weehawken, increasing gradually to 540 feet (160 m) high near their northern terminus. North of Fort Lee, the Palisades are part of Palisades Interstate Park and are a National Natural Landmark.

The Palisades are among the most dramatic geologic features in the vicinity of New York City, forming a canyon of the Hudson north of the George Washington Bridge, as well as providing a vista of the Manhattan skyline. They sit in the Newark Basin, a rift basin located mostly in New Jersey.

Palisade is derived from the same root as the word pole, ultimately from the Latin word palus, meaning stake. A "palisade" is, in general, a defensive fence or wall made up of wooden stakes or tree trunks. The Lenape called the cliffs "rocks that look like rows of trees", a phrase that became "Weehawken", the namesake of a town in New Jersey that sits at the top of the cliffs across from Midtown Manhattan.

== Geology ==
The basalt cliffs are the margin of a diabase sill, formed about 200 million years ago, at the close of the Triassic period, by the intrusion of molten magma upward into sandstone. The molten material cooled and solidified before reaching the surface. Water erosion of the softer sandstone left behind the columnar structure of harder rock that exists today. The cliffs are about 300 ft (100 m) thick in sections and originally may have reached 1,000 ft (300 m).

The end-Triassic extinction event that coincided with the formation of the Hudson Palisades, Central Atlantic magmatic province, 200 million years ago ranks second in severity of the five major extinction episodes that span geologic time.

Franklyn Van Houten completed groundbreaking research on a rock formation known as the Newark Basin. His discovery of a consistent geological pattern in which lake levels rose and fell is now known as the "Van Houten cycle".

== History ==
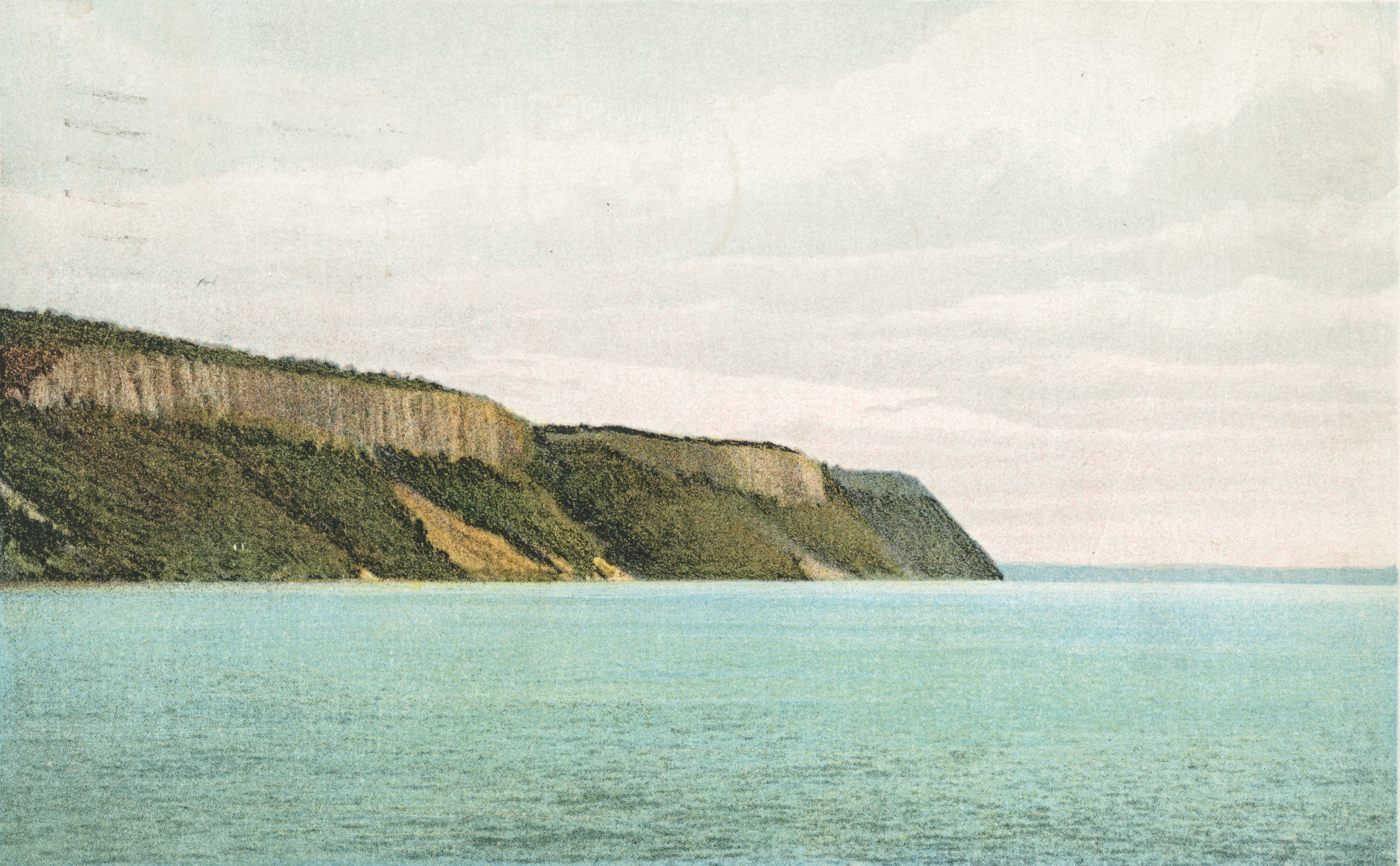
A colored postcard of the Palisades (c. 1898).

The Palisades appear on the first European map of the New World, made by Gerardus Mercator in 1541 based on the description given him by Giovanni da Verrazzano, who suggested they look like a "fence of stakes".

On November 20, 1776, during the early stages of the American Revolution, British military commander Lord Cornwallis landed a force of between 2,500 and 5,000 at Huyler's Landing. In an effort to ambush American general George Washington and crush the rebellion in the wake of the rebels' defeat in the Battle of Long Island and the Battle of Fort Washington, Cornwallis marched his men up the steep Palisades and southward through the Northern Valley. Washington, stationed near Fort Lee, was alerted to the ambush effort by an unknown horseback patriot, remembered only as the Closter Rider, and successfully fled west through Englewood and over the Hackensack River, avoiding capture in what is remembered as Washington's Retreat.

The Palisades were the site of 18 documented duels and probably many unrecorded ones in the years 1798–1845. The most famous is the Burr–Hamilton duel between Alexander Hamilton and Aaron Burr, which took place in a spot known as the Heights of Weehawken on July 11, 1804.

An English visitor, Fanny Trollope, in her book Domestic Manners of the Americans (1832), wrote of a park established at the Palisades by a Hoboken ferryboat entrepreneur at that time:

It is hardly possible to imagine one of greater attraction; a broad belt of light underwood and flowering shrubs, studded at intervals with lofty forest trees, runs for two miles [3 km] along a cliff which overhangs the matchless Hudson; sometimes it feathers the rocks down to its very margin, and at others leaves a pebbly shore, just rude enough to break the gentle waves, and make a music which mimics softly the loud chorus of the ocean. Through this beautiful little wood, a broad well gravelled terrace is led by every point which can exhibit the scenery to advantage; narrower and wilder paths diverge at intervals, some into the deeper shadow of the wood, and some shelving gradually to the pretty coves below. The price of entrance to this little Eden, is the six cents you pay at the ferry.

After the Civil War, signs advertising patent medicines and other products covered the rock face in letters 20 feet (6.1 m) high.

In the 19th century, the cliffs were heavily quarried for railroad ballast, leading to local efforts to preserve them. Beginning in the 1890s, several unsuccessful efforts were made to turn much of the Highlands into a forest preserve. Fearing that they would soon be put out of business, quarry operators responded by working faster: in March 1898 alone, more than three tons of dynamite was used to bring down Washington Head and Indian Head in Fort Lee, New Jersey, producing several million cubic yards of traprock. The following year, work by the New Jersey Federation of Women's Clubs led to the creation of the Palisades Interstate Park Commission, headed by George W. Perkins, which was authorized to acquire land between Fort Lee and Piermont, New York. Its jurisdiction was extended to Stony Point, New York in 1906.

In 1908, the State of New York announced plans to move Sing Sing Prison to Bear Mountain. Work was begun in the area near Highland Lake (renamed Hessian Lake) and in January 1909, the state purchased the 740-acre (300-hectare) Bear Mountain tract. Conservationists, inspired by the work of the Palisades Interstate Park Commission, lobbied successfully for the creation of the Highlands of the Hudson Forest Preserve. However, the prison project was continued. Mary Williamson Averell, whose husband, Union Pacific Railroad president E. H. Harriman died in September of that year, offered the state another 10,000 acres (4,000 hectares) and one million dollars toward the creation of a state park.

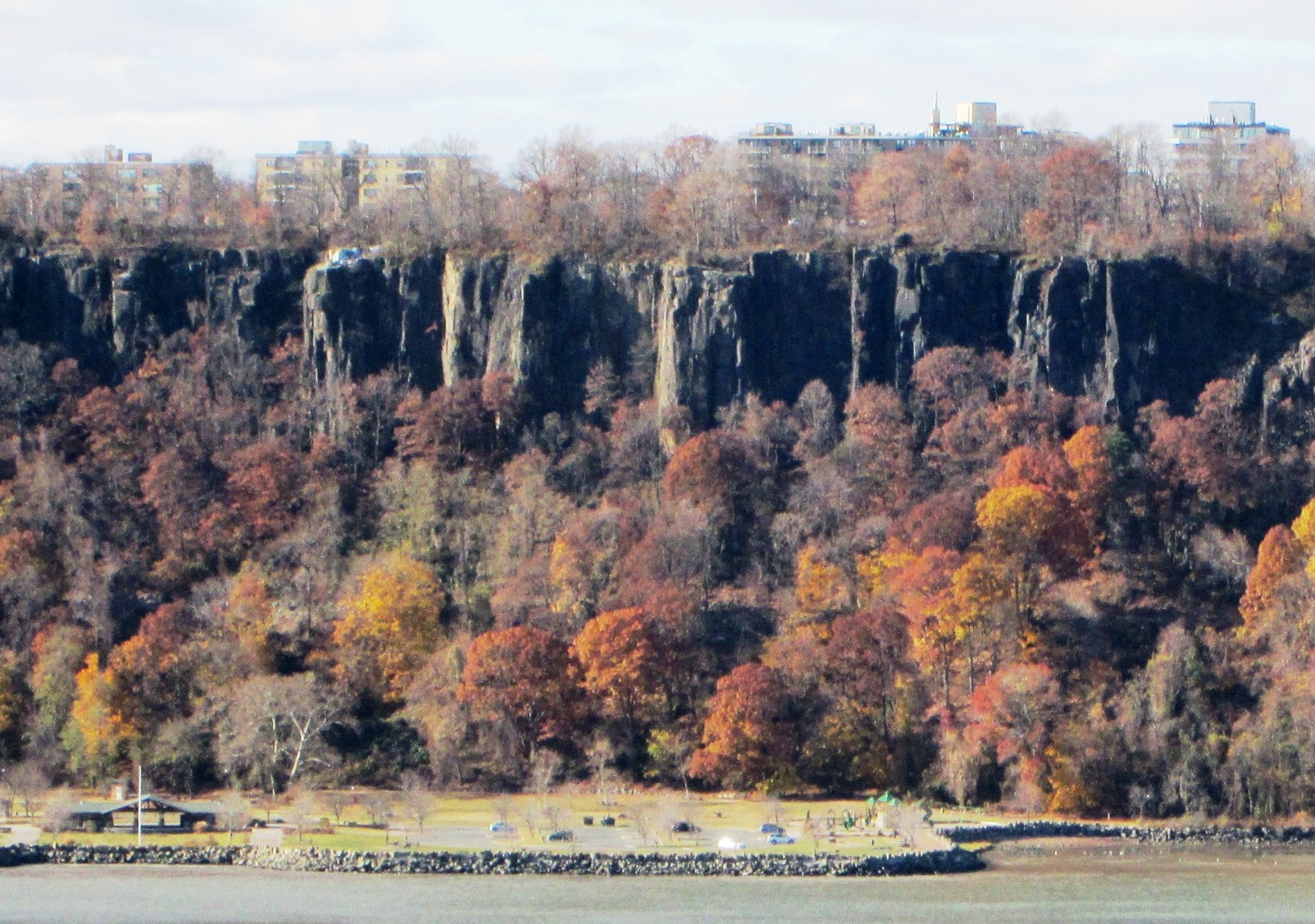
Palisades as seen from West 187th Street and Chittenden Avenue in Washington Heights, Manhattan.

George Walbridge Perkins, who served as president of the Palisades Interstate Park Commission from its creation in 1900 until his death in 1920, with whom she had been working, raised another $1.5 million from a dozen wealthy contributors including John D. Rockefeller and J. P. Morgan. New York State appropriated a matching $2.5 million and the state of New Jersey appropriated $500,000 to build the Henry Hudson Drive (which would be succeeded by the Palisades Parkway in 1947). Ultimately, the Sing Sing relocation was discontinued.

In the 1910s, when Fort Lee was a center of film production, the cliffs were frequently used as film locations. The most notable of these films was The Perils of Pauline (1914), a serial which helped popularize the term cliffhanger.

In October 1931, after four years of construction, the George Washington Bridge opened between Upper Manhattan and Fort Lee.

On April 28, 1940, the Boy Scout Foundation of Greater New York announced the donation of 723 acres (293 hectares) by John D. Rockefeller Jr. to establish a weekend camp for New York City Boy Scouts.

In June 1983, the Palisades were designated a National Natural Landmark by the National Park Service.

On May 12, 2012, a 10,000-short-ton (9,100-tonne) rockfall just south of the state line left a 520-foot (160 m) scar on the cliffs.

The Palisades is now a part of Palisades Interstate Park, a popular destination for hiking and other outdoor recreational activities, which also includes Harriman-Bear Mountain State Park, Minnewaska State Park Preserve, and several other parks and historic sites in the region.

On June 23, 2015, officials of the South Korean conglomerate LG Group announced that their planned new North American headquarters building in Englewood Cliffs, New Jersey, which was originally designed to be 143 feet (44 m) tall, and would have broken the tree line on top of the Palisades, would be reduced to 69 feet (21 m) in height, thus preserving the contour of the ridge. The new building had been opposed by numerous conservation groups and politicians, including four former governors of New Jersey.

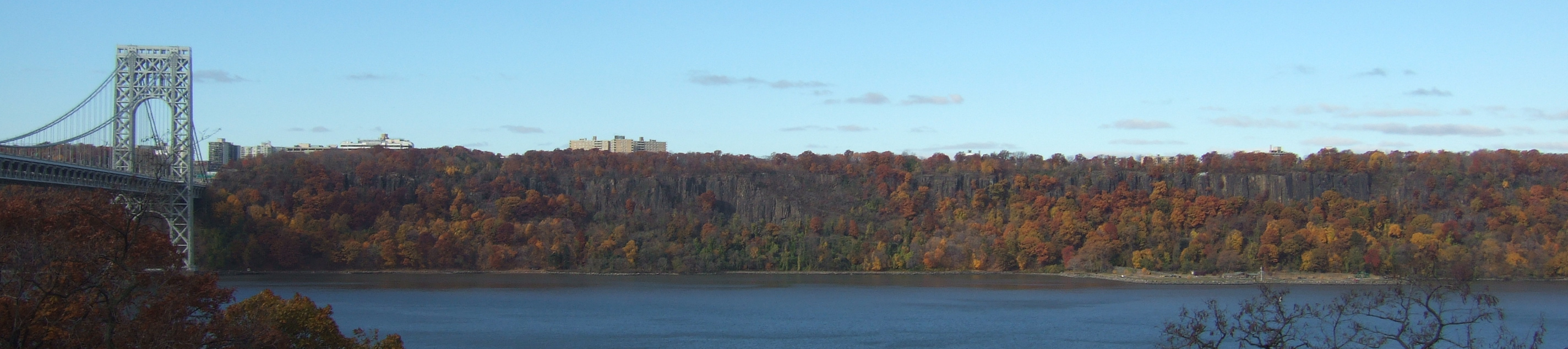
The Palisades, with fall foliage. On the left is the George Washington Bridge. A controversial plan to build a high-rise that would have broken the tree line was proposed, and later modified, by LG Electronics.

== See also ==
- Fairview Quarry
- Hudson River Waterfront Walkway
- Palisades Interstate Parkway
- List of National Natural Landmarks
- Long Path
- Newark Basin
- New York-New Jersey Highlands
- New York-New Jersey Line War
