= Adriaen van der Donck =

Lawyer and landowner in New Netherland (1618–1655)

Jonkheer Adriaen van der Donck
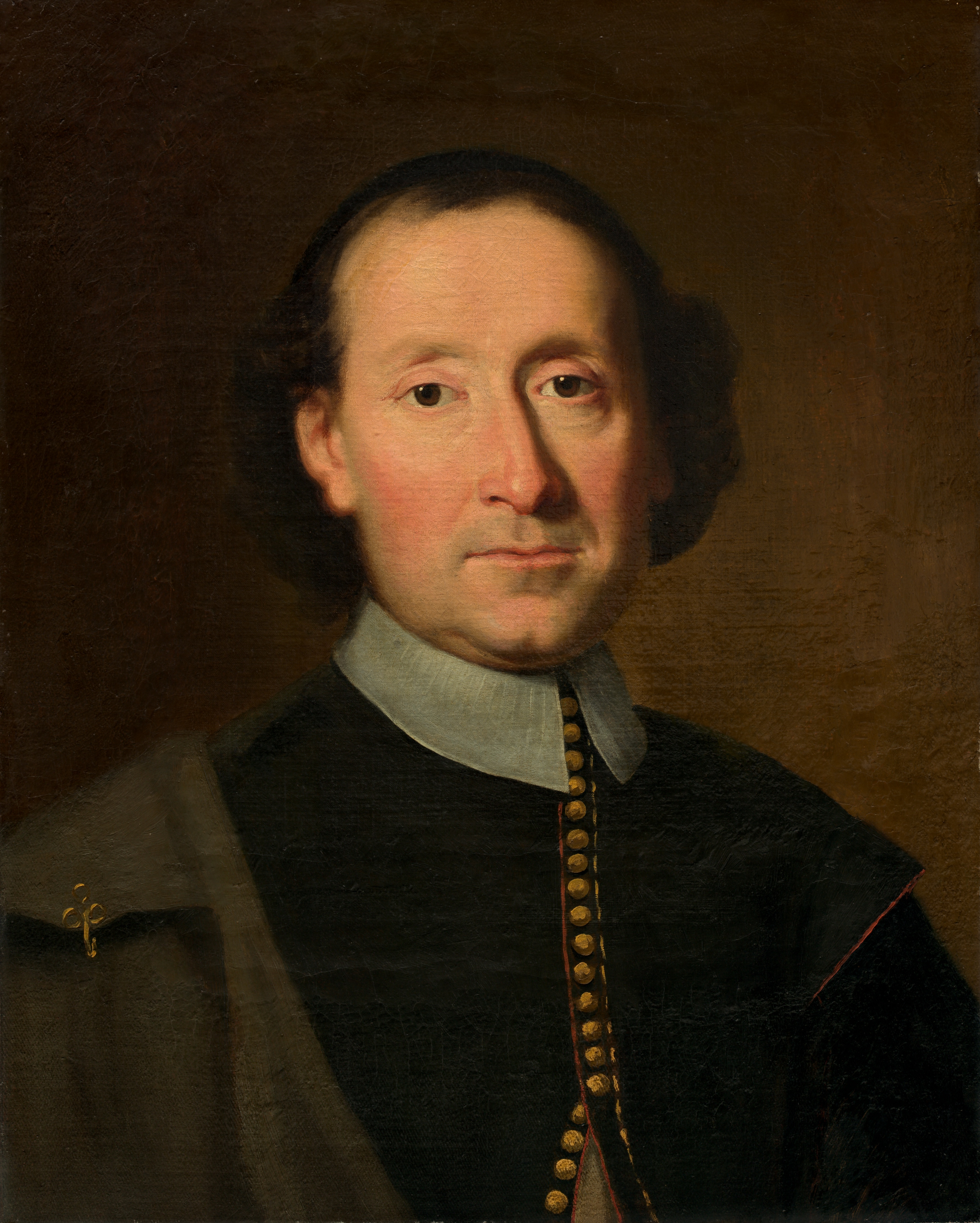
- Possible portrait (Note: According to author Russell Shorto: The National Gallery of Art in Washington, D.C., has determined that in the twentieth century this painting passed through a pair of art dealers who were known to forge the provenances of some works, and thus now considers the subject uncertain. Shorto, Russell (2004) The Island at the Center of the World. New York: Vintage Press. pp.112-113. ISBN 978-1-4000-7867-7)
- Born: Adriaen Cornelissen van der Donck c.1618 Breda, Dutch Republic
- Died: 1655 or 1656; New Netherland
- Education: Leiden University

Adriaen Cornelissen van der Donck (c.1618 – 1655) was a lawyer and landowner in New Netherland after whose honorific Jonkheer the city of Yonkers, New York, is named. Although he was not, as sometimes claimed, the first lawyer in the Dutch colony (an 'honor' that befell the lesser-known Lubbert Dinclagen who arrived in 1634), Van der Donck was a leader in the political life of New Amsterdam (modern New York City), and an activist for Dutch-style republican government in the Dutch West India Company-run trading post.

Enchanted by his new homeland of New Netherland, Van der Donck made detailed accounts of the land, vegetation, animals, waterways, topography, and climate. Van der Donck used this knowledge to actively promote immigration to the colony, publishing several tracts, including his influential Description of New Netherland. Charles Gehring, Director of the New Netherland Institute, has called it "the fullest account of the province, its geography, the Indians who inhabited it, and its prospects ... It has been said that had it not been written in Dutch, it would have gone down as one of the great works of American colonial literature."

Records from the colony brought to public attention in the early 2000s suggest that van der Donck was a significant figure in the early development of what would later become the United States, neglected by history because of the eventual English conquest of New Netherland. Today, he is also recognized as a sympathetic early Native American ethnographer, having learned the languages and observed many of the customs of the Mahicans and Mohawks. His descriptions of their practices are cited in many modern works, such as the 2005 book 1491: New Revelations of the Americas Before Columbus.

== Early life ==
Van der Donck was born in approximately 1618, in the town of Breda in the southern Netherlands. His father was Cornelis Gijsbrechtszoon van der Donck and his mother was Agatha van Bergen. His family was well connected on his mother's side, as her father, Adriaen van Bergen, was remembered as a hero for having helped free Breda from Spanish forces during the course of the Eighty Years' War.

In 1638, van der Donck entered the University of Leiden as a law student. Leiden had rapidly become an intellectual center due to Dutch religious freedom and the lack of censorship. At Leiden, he obtained his Doctor of both laws, that is, both civil and canon law. Despite a booming Dutch economy, van der Donck decided to go to the New World. To this end, he approached the patroon Kiliaen van Rensselaer, securing a post as schout, a combination of sheriff and prosecutor, for his large, semi-independent estate, Rensselaerswijck, located near modern Albany.

== In New Netherland ==
=== Rensselaerswyck ===
Rensselaerswyck series
Dutch West India Company

The Patroon System

Map of Rensselaerswyck

Patroons of Rensselaerswyck:

Kiliaen van Rensselaer
(1630–1640s)
Various
(1640s–1652)
Jan Baptist van Rensselaer
(1652–1658)
Jeremias van Rensselaer
(1658–1674)
Kiliaen van Rensselaer
(1674–1687)
Kiliaen van Rensselaer
(1687–1719)
Jeremias van Rensselaer
(1719–1745)
Stephen van Rensselaer I
(1745–1747)
Stephen van Rensselaer II
(1747–1769)
Abraham Ten Broeck
(1769–1784, de facto)
Stephen van Rensselaer III
(1784–1839)

In 1641, van der Donck sailed to the New World aboard Den Eykenboom (The Oak Tree). He was immediately impressed by the land, which, in contrast with the Netherlands, was thickly forested, hilly, and full of wildlife. Once in his post, he attracted the ire of Van Rensselaer with his independence. This manifested itself first when the schout selected one of the patroon's finest stallions for himself and then decided that his appointed farm was poorly chosen and simply picked another site.

The patroon expected van der Donck's primary concern to be the colony's profit rather than the colonists' welfare. According to Van Rensselaer, his duty was "to seek my advantage and protect me against loss". This was to consist mainly of cracking down on the black market and catching those who ran away before their service contracts expired. Instead, van der Donck ignored Van Rensselaer's orders when told to collect late rent from those who obviously could not pay, protested that colonists could not swear binding oaths of loyalty on behalf of their servants, and began organizing improvements to various mills and the construction of a brickyard. Van Rensselaer's letters indicate that he became increasingly frustrated with his schout's behavior, chiding him, "from the beginning you have acted not as officer but as director".

In his employer's eyes, van der Donck also spent a disturbing amount of time exploring the surroundings. During these excursions, he learned a great deal about the land and its inhabitants, often neglecting his duties as schout in his eagerness to observe and document as much as he could about this new land. He met local Indians, such as the Mahicans and the Mohawks, ate their food, and became adept at their language. Van der Donck recorded their customs, beliefs, medicine, political structure, and technology in an objective and detailed way.

Unsatisfied in his post and realizing the potential of the land, van der Donck eventually began to use his contacts amongst the Indians to negotiate for land in the Catskills, where he wanted to found his own colony. When Van Rensselaer learned that van der Donck sought to acquire neighboring land to his own, he snapped it up first. Van der Donck's contract as schout was not renewed when its term expired in 1644.

=== Early political activism ===
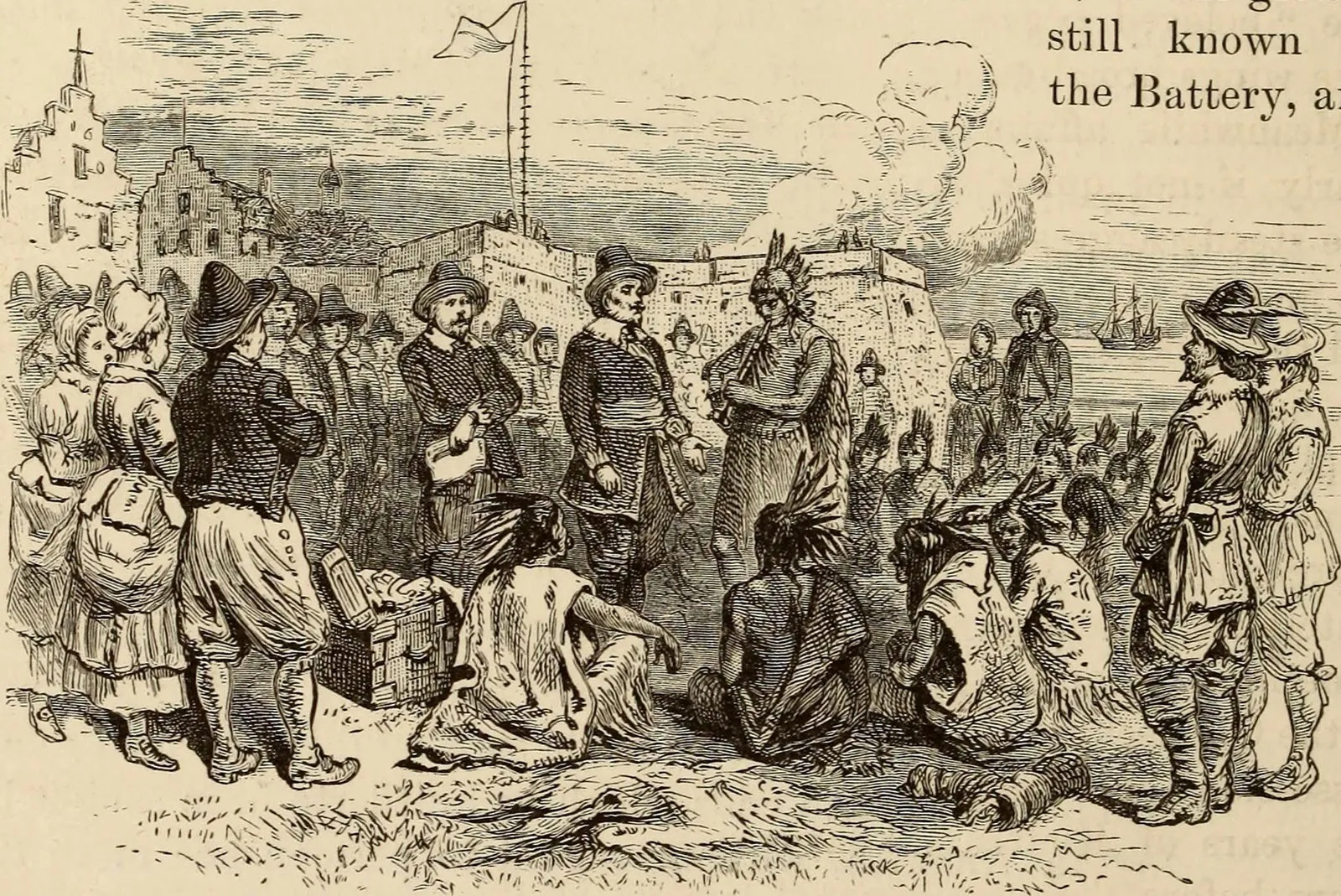
Willem Kieft smoking a peace pipe peace with an Algonquian Chief after Kieft's War, 1645

In New Amsterdam, disgruntled colonists had been sending ineffective complaints to the Dutch West India Company about the Director of New Netherland, Willem Kieft, who had begun a bloody war with the Indians against the advice of the council of twelve men. Kieft's War badly damaged relations and trade between the Indians and the Dutch, made life more dangerous for colonists living in outlying areas, and drained the colony's resources. He exacerbated his relationship with the already financially strained colonists by enacting a tax on beaver skins and beer to fund the war.

In 1645, Kieft tried to mend relations with the Indians and asked van der Donck to assist as a guide and interpreter. At the negotiations, Kieft found himself in the awkward position of coming without the necessary gifts. Van der Donck had not informed Kieft of this important component to negotiations in advance, but happened to have brought an appropriate amount of sewant (wampum), which he loaned to Kieft.

In return for this favor, Kieft granted van der Donck 24,000 acres (97 km^{2}) on the mainland north of Manhattan in the territory of the Wecquaesgeek in 1646. He named the estate Colen Donck and built several mills along what he named the Saeck Kill, later to become the Nepperhan River and today the Saw Mill. The estate was so large that locals referred to him as the Jonkheer ("young gentleman" or "squire"), a word from which the name "Yonkers" is derived. By this time, van der Donck had already married the Englishwoman Mary Doughty, whose father had lost his land after irking Kieft.

Kieft remained out of favor with the colonists in New Amsterdam. Van der Donck stepped into this environment of political unrest and used his rhetorical legal skills to give voice to the disaffected colonists. Upon his arrival, the tone of the colonists' petitions suddenly changed. While ostensibly putting himself at Kieft's disposal as a lawyer and a translator, he was working with disgruntled members of the community to get Kieft recalled and convince the company of the need for a Dutch-style representative government in New Amsterdam.

The Dutch West India Company did decide to remove Kieft from his post in 1645, citing the terrible damage caused to trade by his war against the Indians. But rather than yield to the colonists' requests for the establishment of local government, the company decided that a stronger representative would succeed in squelching political dissent. They chose Peter Stuyvesant as Director-General. Despite this change, van der Donck continued his flurry of documents against Kieft, apparently using his example now solely to make a case for the creation of a local government.

=== Nine Men ===
The new director-general tried to take a firm hand with the colonists — it was noted that anyone who opposed Stuyvesant "hath as much as the sun and moon against him" — but eventually he had to agree to the creation of a permanent advisory board. Following a Dutch tradition, eighteen people would be elected, from whom Stuyvesant would choose nine to serve. Van der Donck was among the Nine Men selected in December 1648, and quickly became a leading figure.

Van der Donck began keeping a journal of the colonists' many grievances against the West India Company, Kieft, and Stuyvesant, planning to synthesize their complaints into a single document to be presented to the Dutch States General. When Stuyvesant got wind of this, he ordered van der Donck put under house arrest, seized his papers, and arranged his removal from the Nine Men.

Despite this, on July 26, 1649, eleven current and former members of the Nine Men signed the Petition of the Commonality of New Netherland, which requested that the States General take action to encourage economic freedom and force local government like that in the Netherlands. Van der Donck was one of three men selected to travel to the Netherlands to present this request, along with a description of the colony written primarily by van der Donck entitled Remonstrance of New Netherland. (Note: Also sometimes called The Representation of New Netherland.) The latter makes the case that the colony is unusually valuable and in danger of being lost due to mismanagement under the Dutch West India Company.

== Return to the Netherlands ==
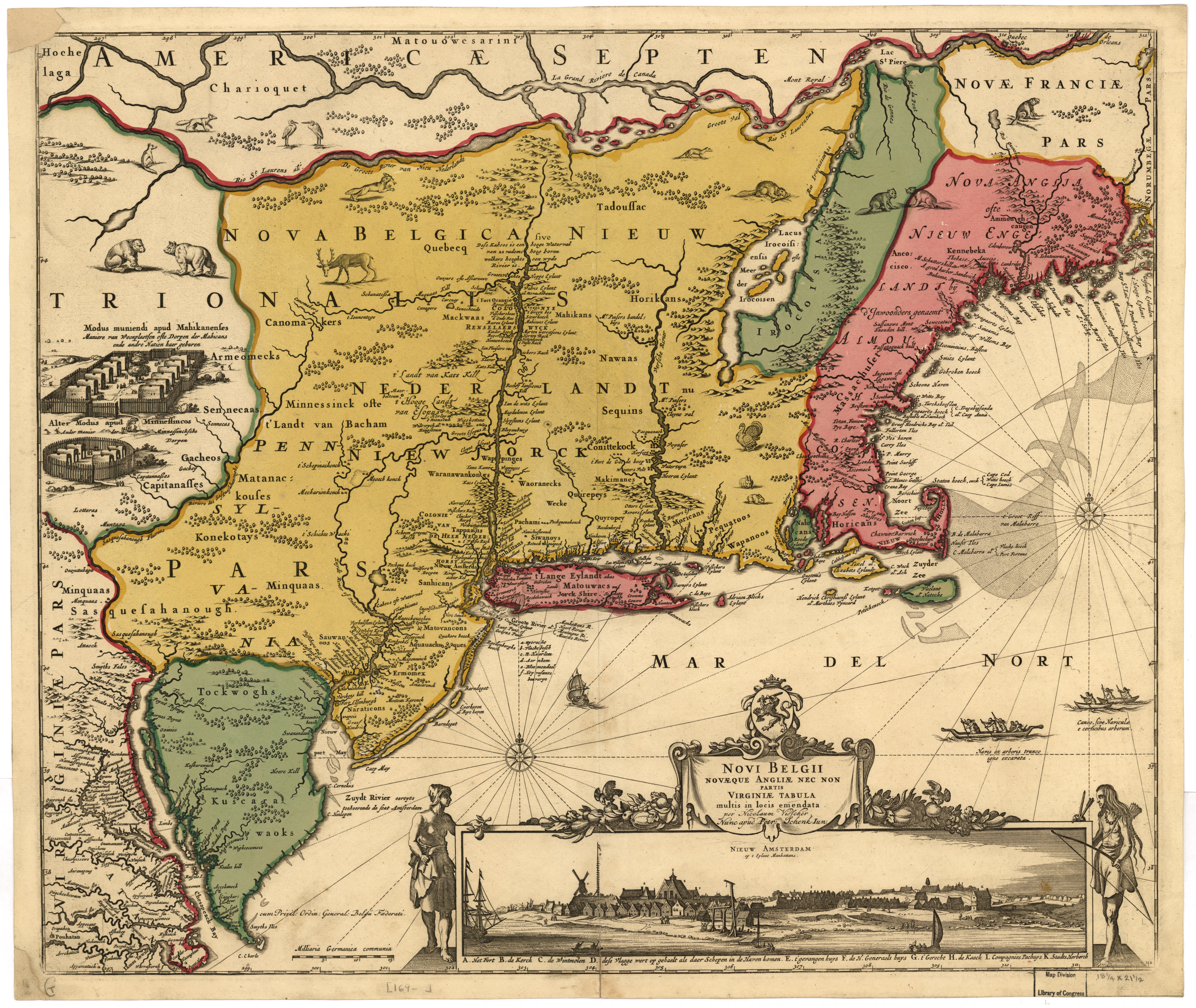
1685 interpretation of the Jansson-Visscher map of the American Northeast first published in 1656 by van der Donck

While in the Netherlands, van der Donck engaged in political and public relations campaigns in addition to organizing groups of new colonists for New Netherland. He repeatedly presented his case to the States General opposite a representative sent by Stuyvesant, Cornelis van Tienhoven.

=== Activism on behalf of the colony ===
The case before the States General was delayed because of disruptions within the Dutch government caused by William II of Orange. During this delay, van der Donck turned his attention to public relations. In 1650, he printed his Remonstrance as a pamphlet. His enthusiastic description of the land and its potential created much excitement about New Netherland; so many were suddenly eager to immigrate that ships were forced to turn away paying passengers. A Dutch West India Company director wrote, "Formerly New Netherland was never spoken of, and now heaven and earth seem to be stirred up by it and every one tries to be the first in selecting the best pieces [of land] there."

To go alongside the Remonstrance, van der Donck commissioned the Jansson-Visscher Map of the colony. The map was color engraved by Johannes Blaue and designed in such a way that it would appear visually appealing. It showed New Netherland along the original Dutch territorial claim from Cape Hinlopen just south of the Delaware Bay at 38 degrees to the start of New England at 42 degrees and included drawings of typical Indian villages, wild game, and the town of New Amsterdam. The map itself remained the definitive depiction of the area for over a century, cementing many Dutch place names. It would be reprinted thirty-one times before the mid-18th century.

=== States General's decision ===
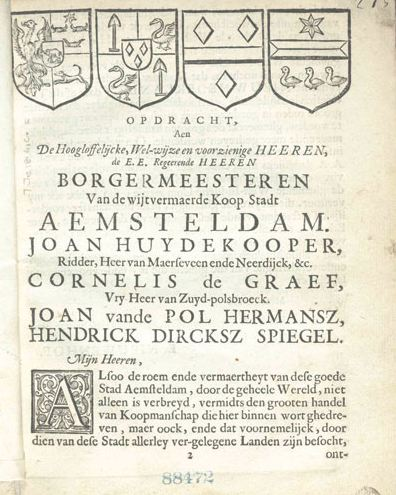
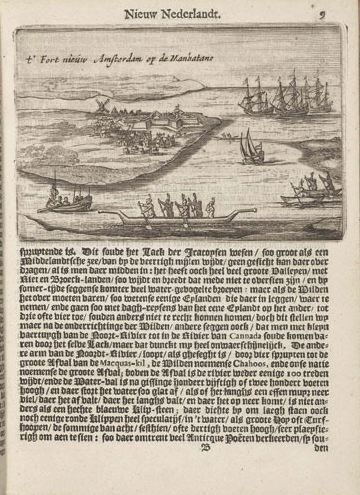
Two pages from van der Donck's Description of New Netherland (1655)

Apparently, van der Donck's decision to go public paid off, because in April 1650, the States General issued a provisional order that the West India Company create a more liberal form of government to encourage emigration to the Dutch colony. They produced their final decision in 1652: the Dutch West India Company was forced to order Stuyvesant to set up a municipal government. A municipal charter was enacted in New Amsterdam on February 2, 1653. The States General also drafted a letter in April 1652 demanding the recall of Stuyvesant to the Netherlands, which van der Donck would personally deliver to the Director-General.

Van der Donck prepared to return to New Amsterdam, having successfully secured a liberal government for the colony without the restrictions of the Dutch West India Company and national support for emigrating colonists from the Netherlands to the colonies. He was also reinstated as President of the Board of Nine and would be a leader in the new government.

But on May 29, 1652, before van der Donck could sail for home, the First Anglo-Dutch War broke out, and his hopes for New Amsterdam suddenly and unexpectedly fell apart. The States General feared experimenting in local government in a time of war, and needed the close cooperation of the West India Company (practically a branch of the military) in the struggle, and so rescinded their decision.

Defeated, van der Donck tried to return to New Netherland, but was blocked because of the destabilizing effect of his activism. In the meantime, he took a Supremus in jure degree at the University of Leiden. Still eager to promote the colony, he also wrote a comprehensive description of its geography and native peoples based on material in his earlier Remonstrance. This new book was well-crafted to the interests of his audience, consisting of an analysis of European claims to New Netherland, and extensive description of Indians and their customs, a chapter on beavers, and, finally, a dialogue between a Dutch "Patriot" and a New Netherlander addressing the questions of potential colonists.

Though it was finished and copyrighted by July 1653, because of the war, the publication of Beschryvinge van Nieuw-Nederlant (Description of New Netherland) was delayed until 1655. Van der Donck's motivation was directed at encouraging greater settlement in the colony. The book was wildly popular, going into a second edition the very next year; however, it was not published in English until 1841, in a translation that eliminated subtleties and often even reversed the intended meaning, characterized by the editor of a modern edition as "inept". Of special note to modern anthropologists are Van der Donck's descriptions of the indigenous peoples' beliefs regarding God, devils, and the origin of the world. His observations can now readily be obtained from a more modern translation of the Description, which is still in print.

== Return to New Amsterdam ==
Coat of Arms of Adriaen van der Donck

After years of firmly blocking van der Donck's requests to sail, the Dutch West India Company finally agreed on May 26, 1653, to allow him to return home to his family on the condition he retire from public life. The Company sent the following petition to its directors:

The undersigned, Adriaen van der Donck, humbly requests consent and passport of the Board to go to New Netherland, offering to resign the commission previously given to him as President of the community, or otherwise as its deputy, and...to accept no office whatever it may be, but rather to live in private peacefully and quietly as a common inhabitant, submitting to the orders and commands of the Company or those enacted by its director.

However, once arrived, van der Donck's giving up public office was apparently not enough, as he was subsequently denied the right to continue practicing law because there was no one of "sufficient ability and the necessary qualifications" to equal him. These restrictions seem to have not hindered his behind-the-scenes efforts: another political uprising against Stuyvesant broke out just weeks after van der Donck's return. In December, he had to petition for protection from Stuyvesant.

There is no record of van der Donck's death, but he was alive and just 37 years old during the summer of 1655, then referred to as deceased in a court case heard January 10, 1656 over parties disputing ownership of two bibles taken from his house by Indians. An affidavit from his widow was presented in that case on the matter. He evidently died on his estate, perhaps peacefully, as it is likely that a violent death in a raid during the Peach War of September 1655 would have been raised and noted in the court record. He was survived by his wife and by his parents, whom he had separately convinced to emigrate.

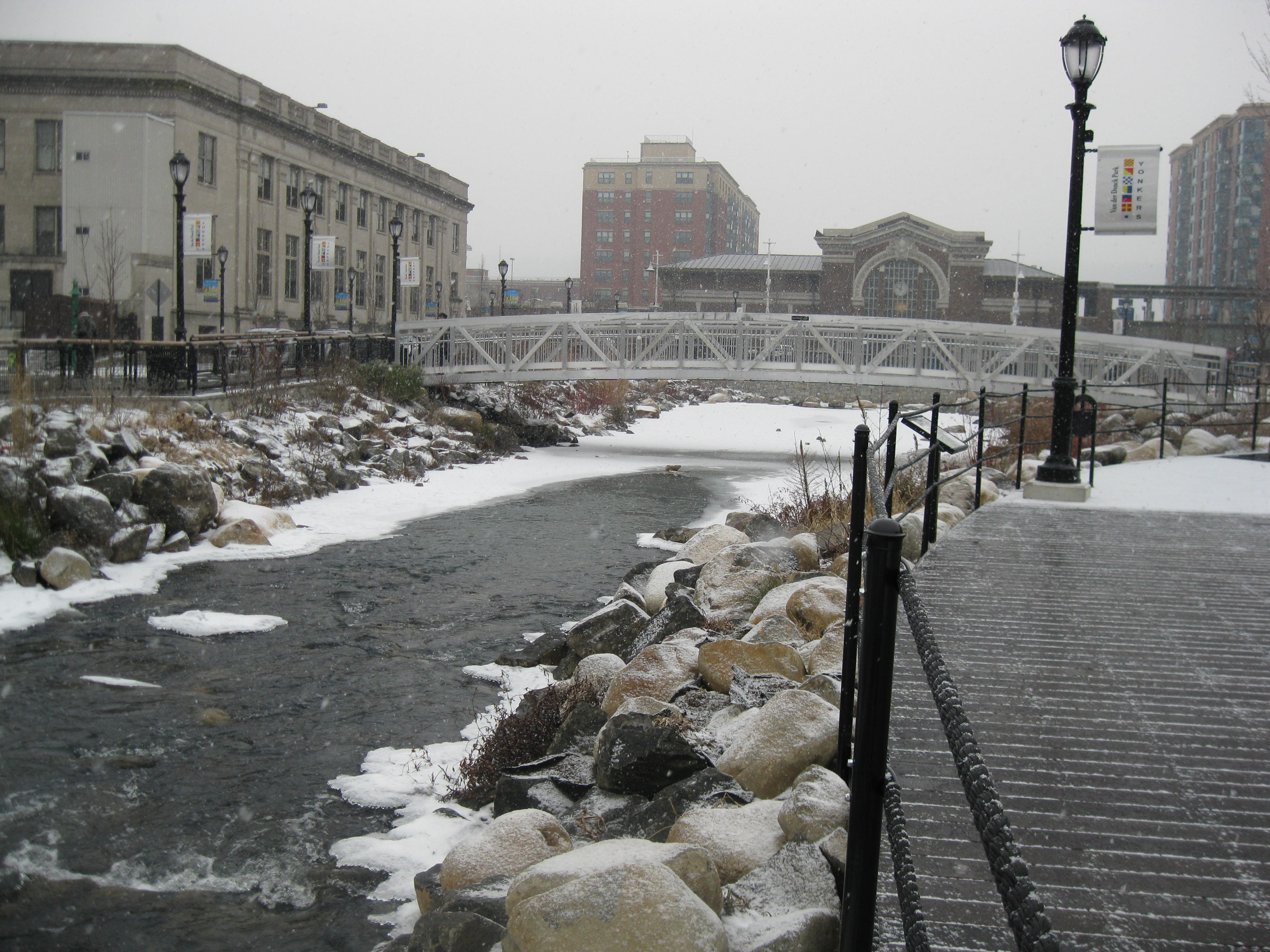
A section of the recently daylighted Saw Mill River in Van Der Donck Park in Getty Square neighborhood of Yonkers

== Legacy ==
Johnson's translation was long recognized as "defective" and even "inept", but until 2008 remained the only translation available. Nevertheless, Mariana Van Rensselaer called van der Donck's Description of New Netherland "an exceptionally intelligent book of its kind", especially praising its quality as a natural history monograph. Its quality as an ethnography has also been praised by anthropologists and historians. Thomas O'Donnell wrote,

Had he written in English rather than Dutch, his Description would certainly have won from posterity the same kind, if not the same amount, of veneration that has been bestowed on Bradford's Of Plymouth Plantation. As it turned out, Van der Donck's book was written, published, widely read, put aside, and, alas, almost forgotten long before Bradford's book was published at all.

Though the English eventually took over the colony, the city of New Amsterdam retained the municipal charter van der Donck had lobbied for, including uniquely Dutch features, such as a guarantee of free trade.

In his 2004 work The Island at the Center of the World, the New York Times contributing writer Russell Shorto wrote that van der Donck's character and actions were important to the development of the American spirit and he labeled Donck as a "forgotten American patriot."

The author J. van den Hout, in his book Adriaen van der Donck: A Dutch Rebel in Seventeenth Century America, stated that, "At best, he (van der Donck) has been labeled a hero, a visionary, and a spokesman for the people. At worst he has been branded arrogant and selfish, thinking only of his own ambitions.

== Sources ==
- Gehring, Charles, trans. (2000). Correspondence, 1647–1653. New Netherland documents. Syracuse University Press. ISBN 0-8156-2792-0.
- Gehring, Charles; Starna, William (2008). "Preface". Description of New Netherland. Iroquoians and their World. University of Nebraska Press. ISBN 9780803210882.
- Goodwin, Maud Wilder (1919). Dutch and English on the Hudson. Yale University Press. ISBN 0-7661-5998-1.
- Jameson, J. Franklin, ed. (1909). "The Representation of New Netherland, 1650". Narratives of New Netherland, 1609–1664. Charles Scribner's Sons. ISBN 9781404762732. OCLC 797898700.
- O'Donnell, Thomas F. (1968). "Editor's Introduction". A Description of New Netherland. Syracuse University Press. OCLC 449369.
- Shorto, Russell (2004). The Island at the Center of the World: The Epic Story of Dutch Manhattan and the Forgotten Colony that Shaped America. Random House. ISBN 1-4000-7867-9.
- Shorto, Russell (2008). "Forward". A Description of New Netherland. Iroquoians and their World. University of Nebraska Press. ISBN 9780803210882.
- Van Gastel, Ada (1990). "Van der Donck's Description of the Indians: Additions and Corrections". The William and Mary Quarterly. 47 (3): 411–21. doi:10.2307/2938095. JSTOR 2938095.
- Van Gastel, Ada (1992). "Ethnic Pluralism in Early American Literature: Incorporating Dutch-American Texts into the Canon". In Derounian-Stodola, Kathryn Zabelle (ed.). Early American Literature and Culture. University of Delaware Press. ISBN 0874134234.
- Van Rensselaer, Mariana (1909). History of New York in the Seventeenth Century: New Amsterdam. New York: The Macmillan Company. ISBN 9781602063525. OCLC 938239.
- Van Rensselaer, Kiliaen (1908). Van Rensselaer Bowier Manuscripts: Being the Letters of Kiliaen Van Rensselaer, 1630-1643, and Other Documents Relating to the Colony of Rensselaerswyck. Translated by A. J. F. van Laer. University of the State of New York. OCLC 9261526.

Further reading

- Jameson, J. Franklin, ed. (1909). Narratives of New Netherland, 1609–1664. Bowie, Maryland: Heritage Books. ISBN 1-55613-317-0.
- Snow, Dean R. Snow; Gerhing, Charles T.; Starna, William, eds. (1996). In Mohawk Country: Early Narratives about a Native People. Syracuse University Press. ISBN 0-8156-0410-6.
- van der Donck, Adriaen (2008). A Description of New Netherland. Translated by Goedhuys, D. W. University of Nebraska Press. ISBN 9780803210882.
