= New Amsterdam =

Dutch settlement (1624–1664)

New Amsterdam Nieuw Amsterdam (Dutch) New Orange (English) Nieuw Oranje (Dutch)
- Settlement
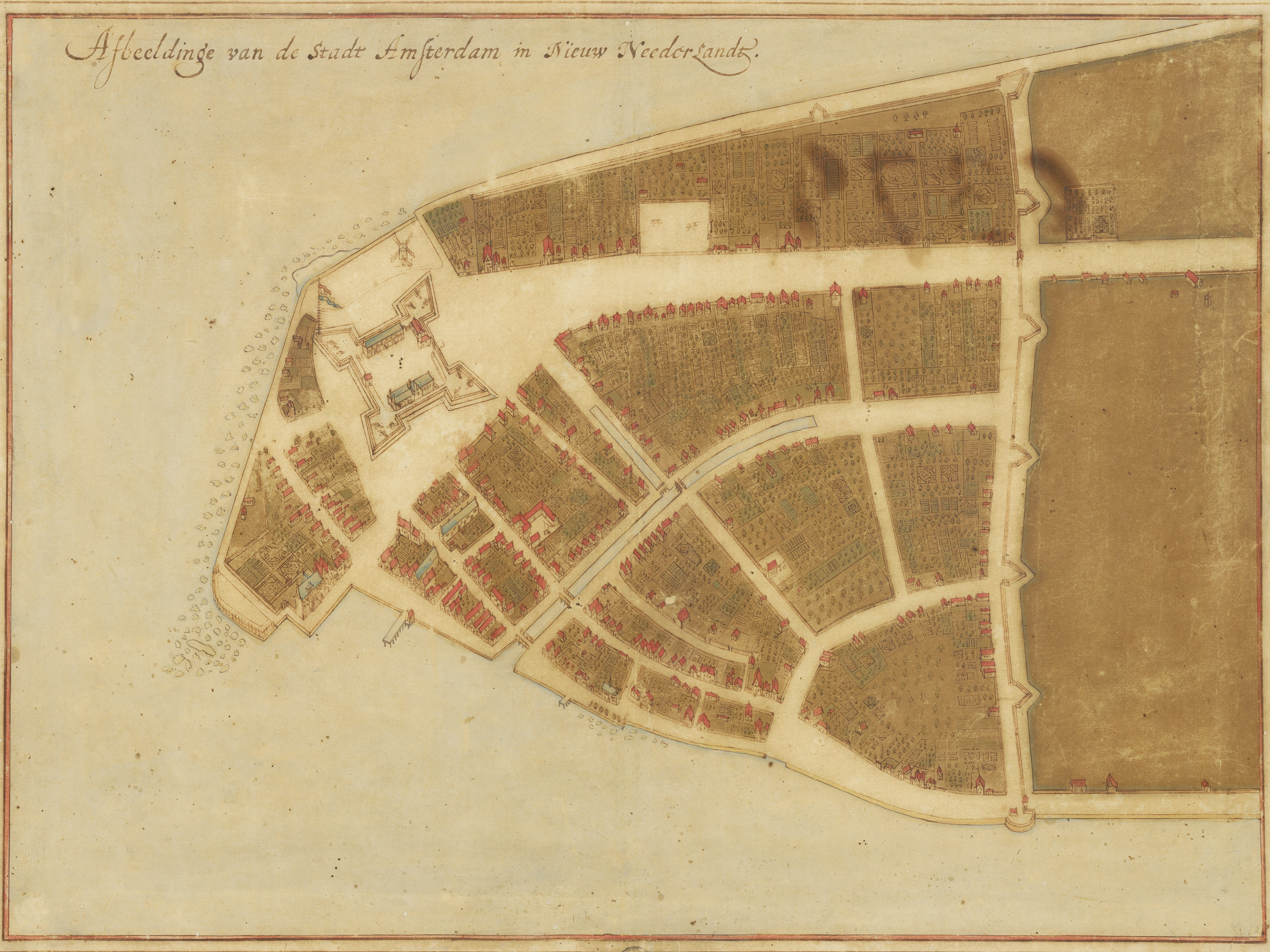
- View of New Amsterdam (modern Manhattan)

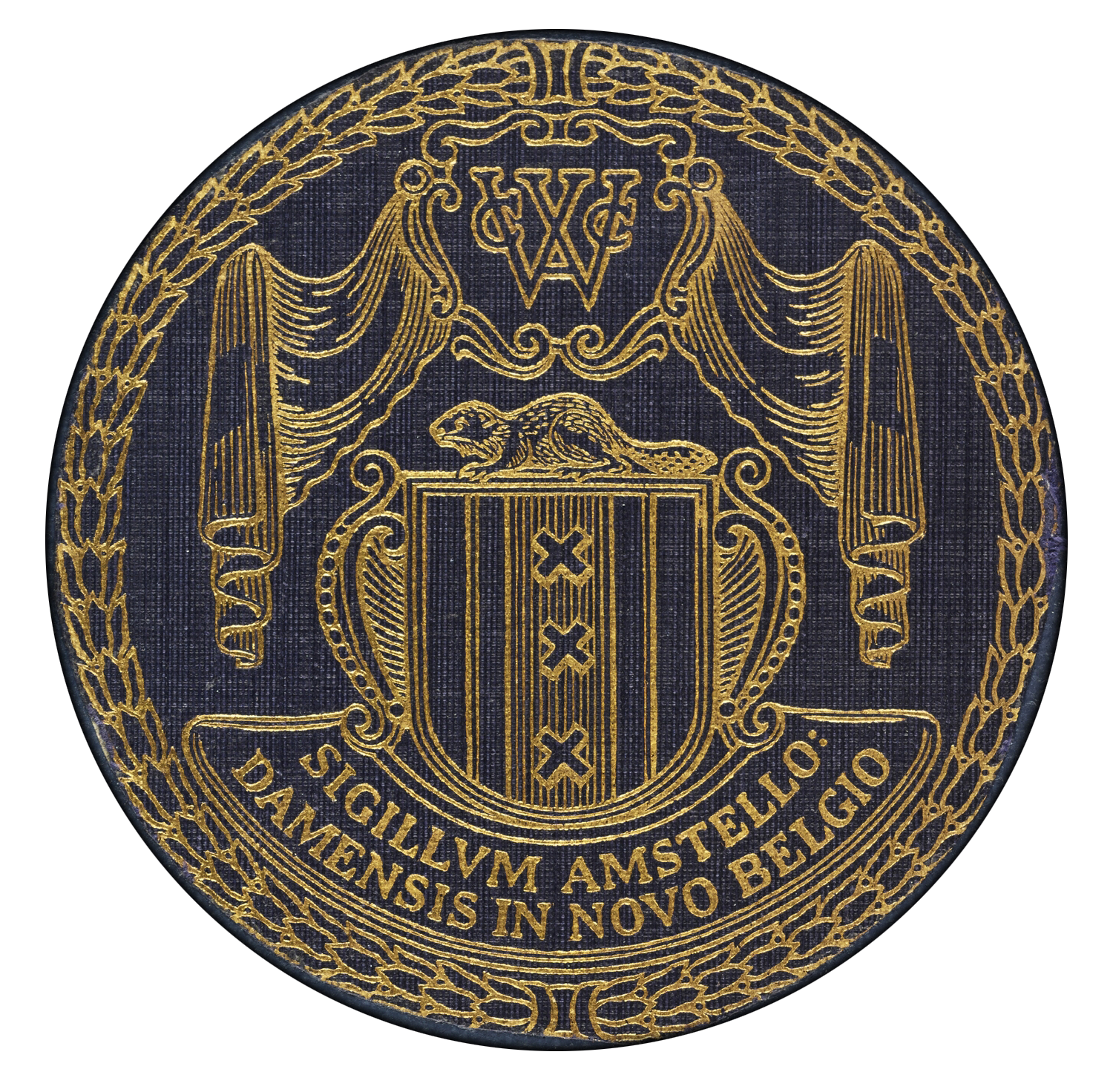
- Flag Seal

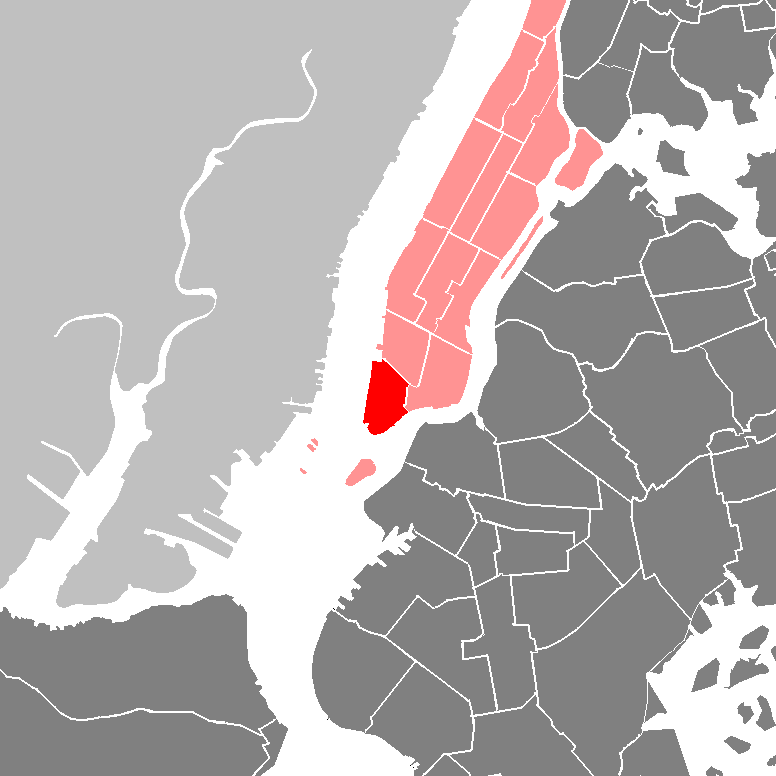
- New Amsterdam is located in what is now Lower Manhattan
- Dutch colony: New Netherland
- Settled: 1624 (402 years ago)
- Conquered by the English: 1664 (362 years ago)
- Recaptured by the Dutch: 1673 (353 years ago)
- Relinquished to the English: 1674 (352 years ago)

Government
  - Type: Colonial government
  - Body: Council of Mayors, Schepen and a Schout
  - Director-general of New Amsterdam: Peter Stuyvesant (Dutch West India Company)

Area
  - Land: 94 km^{2} (36 sq mi)
- Highest elevation: 122 m (400 ft)
- Lowest elevation: 0 m (0 ft)

Population
  - Estimate (1664): 2,500
  - Rank: 1st in New Netherland
- Demonym: New Netherlander
- Time zone: UTC−05:00 (EST)

New Amsterdam (Dutch: Nieuw Amsterdam, pronounced [ˌniu.ɑmstərˈdɑm]) was a 17th-century Dutch settlement established at the southern tip of Manhattan Island that served as the seat of the colonial government in New Netherland. The initial trading factory gave rise to the settlement around Fort Amsterdam. The fort was situated on the strategic southern tip of the island of Manhattan and was meant to defend the fur trade operations of the Dutch West India Company in the North River (Hudson River). In 1624, it became a provincial extension of the Dutch Republic and was designated as the capital of the province in 1625. New Amsterdam became a city when it received municipal rights on February 2, 1653.

By 1655, the population of New Netherland had grown to over 2,000 people, with a 1,500 majority residing in the city of New Amsterdam. By 1664, the population of New Netherland had risen to almost 9,000 people, 2,500 of whom lived in New Amsterdam, 1,000 lived near Fort Orange, and the remainder in other towns and villages.

In 1664, the English military seized control over New Amsterdam and renamed it New York after the Duke of York (later James II & VII). After the Second Anglo-Dutch War of 1665–67, England and the United Provinces of the Netherlands agreed to the status quo in the Treaty of Breda. The English kept the island of Manhattan, the Dutch giving up their claim to New Amsterdam and the rest of the colony, while the English formally abandoned Surinam in South America, and the island of Run in the East Indies to the Dutch, confirming their control of the valuable Spice Islands. The area occupied by New Amsterdam is now Lower Manhattan.

== Etymology ==
The indigenous Munsee term for the southern tip of the island was Manhattoe, and variations of this name were also applied to the first Dutch settlement there. With the construction of Fort Amsterdam, the town also became variously known as "Amsterdam" or "New Amsterdam". New Amsterdam's city limits did not extend north of the wall of Wall Street, and neither the remainder of the island of Manhattan nor of wider New Netherland fell under its definition.

== History ==
=== Early exploration and settlement (1609–1624) ===
In 1524, nearly a century before the arrival of the Dutch, the site that would later become New Amsterdam was named Nouvelle Angoulême by the Italian explorer Giovanni da Verrazzano, to commemorate his patron King Francis I of France, whose family consisted of the Counts of Angoulême. The first recorded exploration by the Dutch of the area around what is now called New York Bay was in 1609 with the voyage of the ship Halve Maen (English: "Half Moon"), commanded by Henry Hudson in the service of the Dutch Republic, as the emissary of Maurice of Nassau, Prince of Orange and stadholder of Holland. Hudson named the river the Mauritius River. He was also covertly attempting to find the Northwest Passage for the Dutch East India Company. Instead, he brought back news about the possibility of exploitation of beaver by the Dutch who sent commercial, private missions to the area the following years.

At the time, beaver pelts were highly prized in Europe, because the fur could be felted to make waterproof hats. A by-product of the trade in beaver pelts was castoreum—the secretion of the animals' anal glands—which was used for its medicinal properties and for perfumes. The expeditions by Adriaen Block and Hendrick Christiaensen in 1611, 1612, 1613 and 1614, resulted in the surveying and charting of the region from the 38th parallel to the 45th parallel. On their 1614 map, which gave them a four-year trade monopoly under a patent of the States General, they named the newly discovered and mapped territory New Netherland for the first time. It also showed the first year-round trading presence in New Netherland, Fort Nassau, which would be replaced in 1624 by Fort Orange, which eventually grew into the town of Beverwijck, renamed Albany in 1664.

Spanish trader Juan Rodriguez (rendered in Dutch as Jan Rodrigues), was born in the Captaincy General of Santo Domingo, the first Spanish Colony in the Americas. Allegedly of Portuguese and African descent, he arrived on Manhattan Island during the winter of 1613–1614 under the command of Thijs Volckenz Mossel captain of the Jonge Tobias, trapping beavers and trading with the local population as a representative of the Dutch East India Company. He is the first recorded non-Indigenous inhabitant of what would eventually become New York.

The territory of New Netherland was originally a private, profit-making commercial enterprise focused on cementing alliances and conducting trade with the local Indigenous peoples. Surveying and exploration of the region was conducted as a prelude to an anticipated official settlement by the Dutch Republic, which occurred in 1624.

==== Pilgrims' attempt to settle in the Hudson River area ====
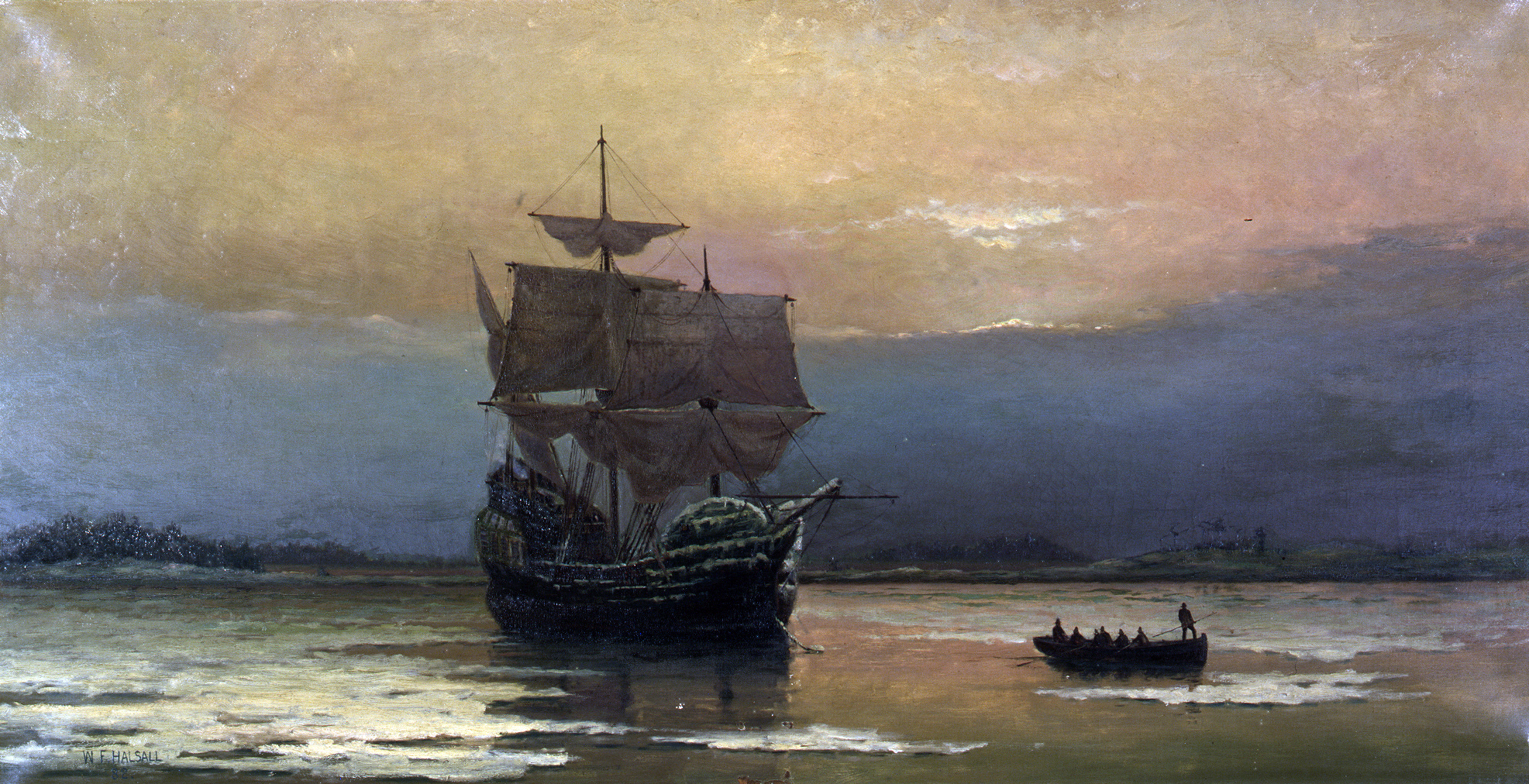
1882 depiction of the ship Mayflower sailing from England to America in 1620, in Plymouth Harbor

In 1620 the Pilgrims attempted to sail to the Hudson River from England. However, Mayflower reached Cape Cod (now part of Massachusetts) on November 9, 1620, after a voyage of 64 days. For a variety of reasons, primarily a shortage of supplies, Mayflower could not proceed to the Hudson River, and the colonists decided to settle near Cape Cod, establishing the Plymouth Colony.

==== Dutch return ====
The mouth of the Hudson River was selected as the ideal place for initial settlement as it had easy access to the ocean while also securing an ice-free lifeline to the beaver trading post near present-day Albany. Here, Indigenous hunters supplied them with pelts in exchange for European-made trade goods and wampum, which was soon being made by the Dutch on Long Island. In 1621, the Dutch West India Company was founded. Between 1621 and 1623, orders were given to the private, commercial traders to vacate the territory, thus opening up the territory to Dutch settlers and company traders. It also allowed the laws and ordinances of the states of Holland to apply. Previously, during the private, commercial period, only the law of the ship had applied.

On May 20, 1624, the first settlers in New Netherland arrived on Noten Eylandt (Nut or Nutten Island, now Governors Island) aboard the ship Nieu Nederlandt under the command of Cornelius Jacobsen May, who disembarked on the island with thirty families to take legal possession of the New Netherland territory. The landing on Governors Island in 1624 brought with it the "legal and cultural DNA" of the Republic of the United Netherlands, including progressive values such as freedom of conscience and tolerance, which were foundational to the culture of early New Netherland. Compared to many parts of Europe at that time, New Netherland embraced a relatively progressive philosophy of inclusion, allowing various nationalities, religions, and races to coexist. The ideals of popular sovereignty and free trade formed the backbone of this diverse society, setting it apart from other colonial powers. However, despite these advanced ideals, the colony also engaged in practices that reflected the broader colonial context, such as the mistreatment of Indigenous populations and the introduction of slavery in 1626. These actions show that while the early settlers were ahead of their time in embracing tolerance, they were also part of the colonial systems that perpetuated injustice and exploitation. The WIC ordered engineer and surveyor Crijn Fredericxsz for the construction of Fort Amsterdam. A fortification was completed in 1626.

The families were then dispersed to Fort Wilhelmus on Verhulsten Island (Burlington Island) in the South River (now the Delaware River), to Kievitshoek (now Old Saybrook, Connecticut) at the mouth of the Verse River (now the Connecticut River) and further north at Fort Nassau on the Mauritius or North River (now the Hudson River), near what is now Albany.

A fort and sawmill were soon erected at Nut Island. The windmill was constructed by Franchoys Fezard and was taken apart for iron in 1648.

=== Fort Amsterdam (1624) ===
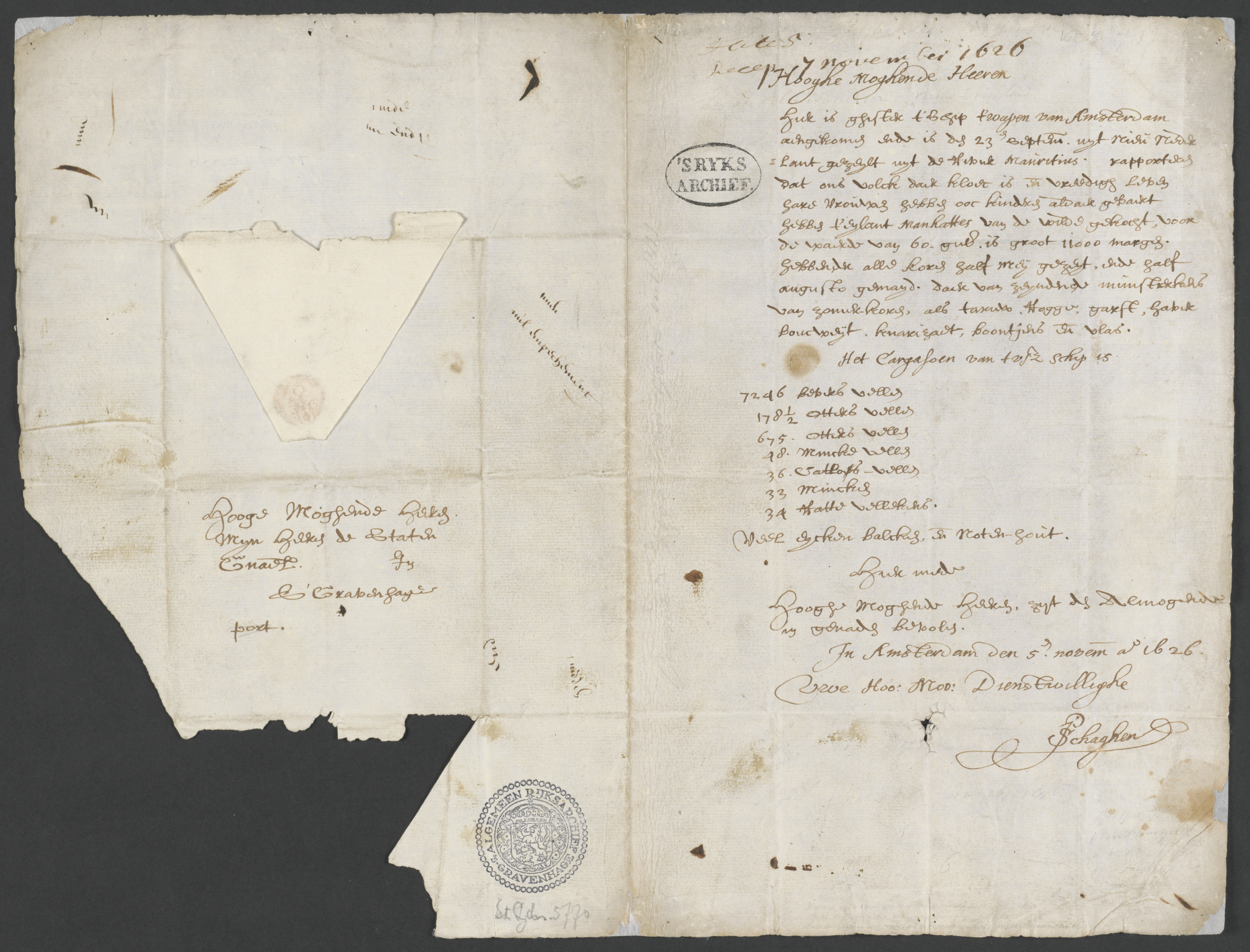
1626 letter in Dutch by Pieter Schaghen stating the purchase of Manhattan for 60 gulden.

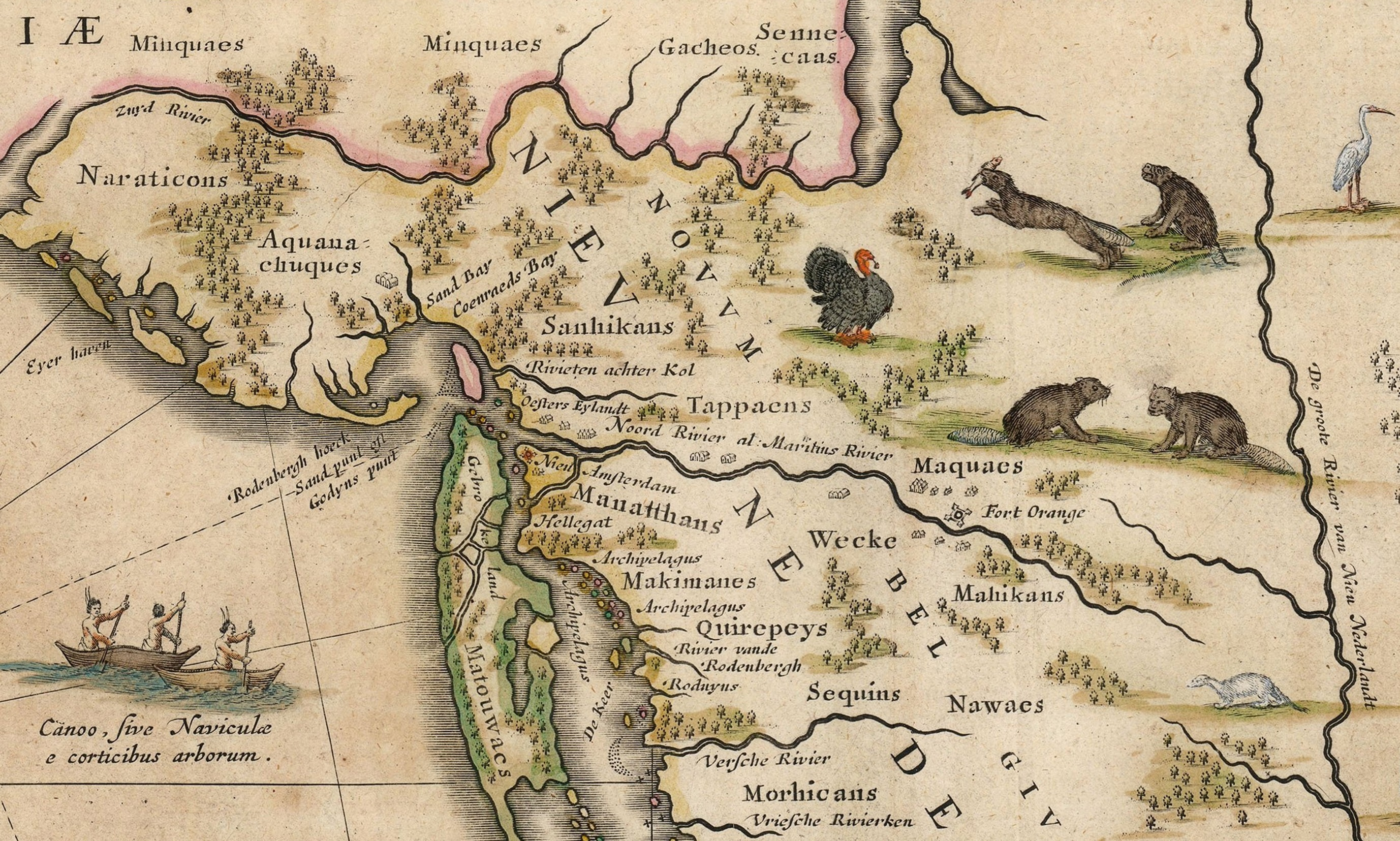
A map of the Hudson River Valley c. 1634 (north is to the right)

The threat of attack from other European colonial powers prompted the directors of the Dutch West India Company to formulate a plan to protect the entrance to the Hudson River. In 1624, 30 families were sponsored by Dutch West India Company moving from Nut Island to Manhattan Island, where a citadel to contain Fort Amsterdam was being laid out by Cryn Frederickz van Lobbrecht at the direction of Willem Verhulst. By the end of 1625, the site had been staked out directly south of Bowling Green on the site of the present U.S. Custom House. The Mohawk-Mahican War in the Hudson Valley led the company to relocate even more settlers to the vicinity of the new Fort Amsterdam. In the end, colonizing was a prohibitively expensive undertaking, only partly subsidized by the fur trade. This led to a scaling back of the original plans. By 1628, a smaller fort was constructed with walls containing a mixture of clay and sand.

The fort also served as the center of trading activity. It contained a barracks, the church, a house for the West India Company director and a warehouse for the storage of company goods. Troops from the fort used the triangle between the Heerestraat and what came to be known as Whitehall Street for marching drills.

=== 1624–1664 ===
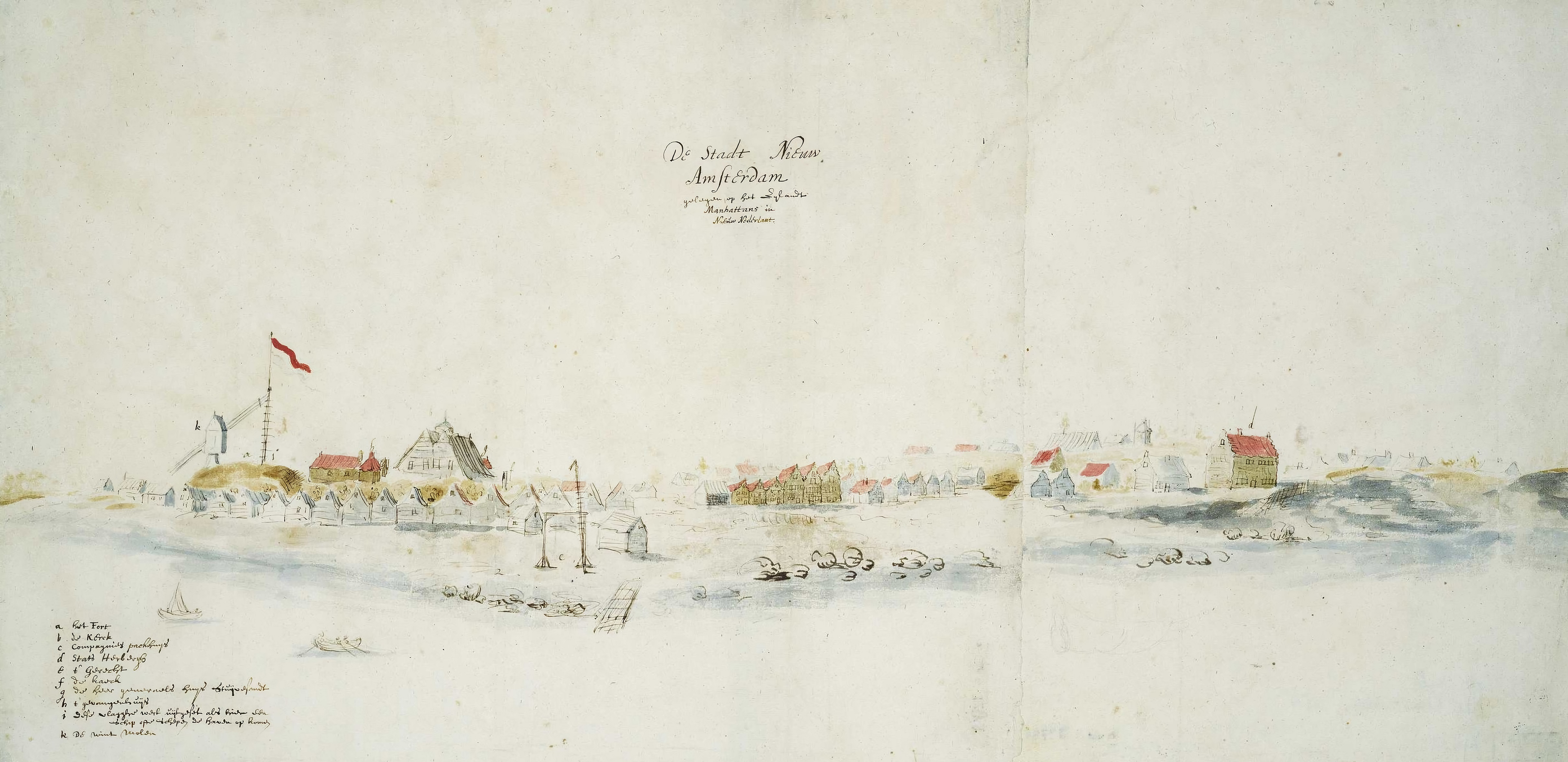
Drawing of New Amsterdam in 1650, discovered in 1991 in the collection of Albertina in Austria. It is probably the oldest, lifelike depiction of the colony

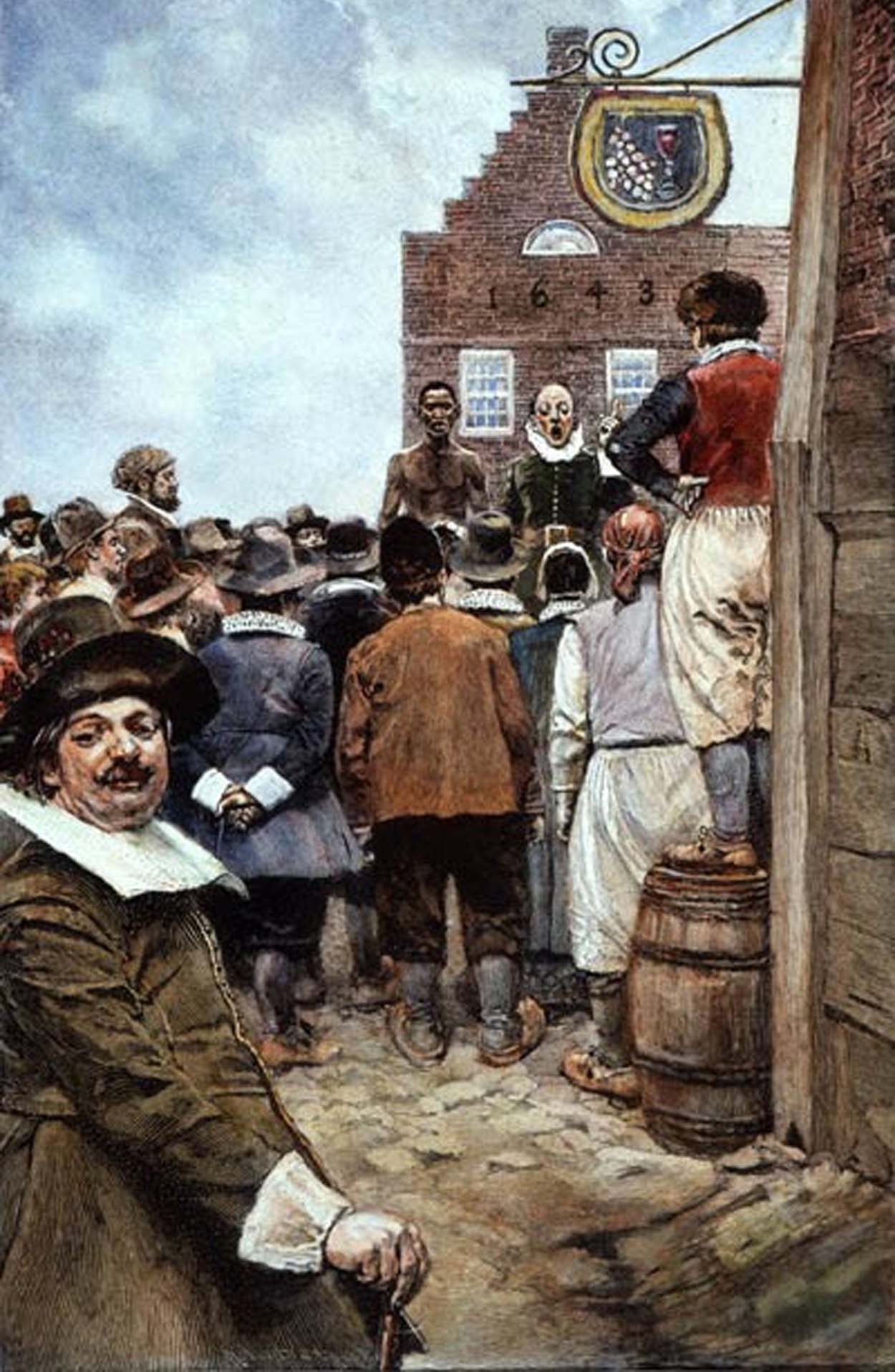
The First Slave Auction at New Amsterdam in 1655, by Howard Pyle in 1895

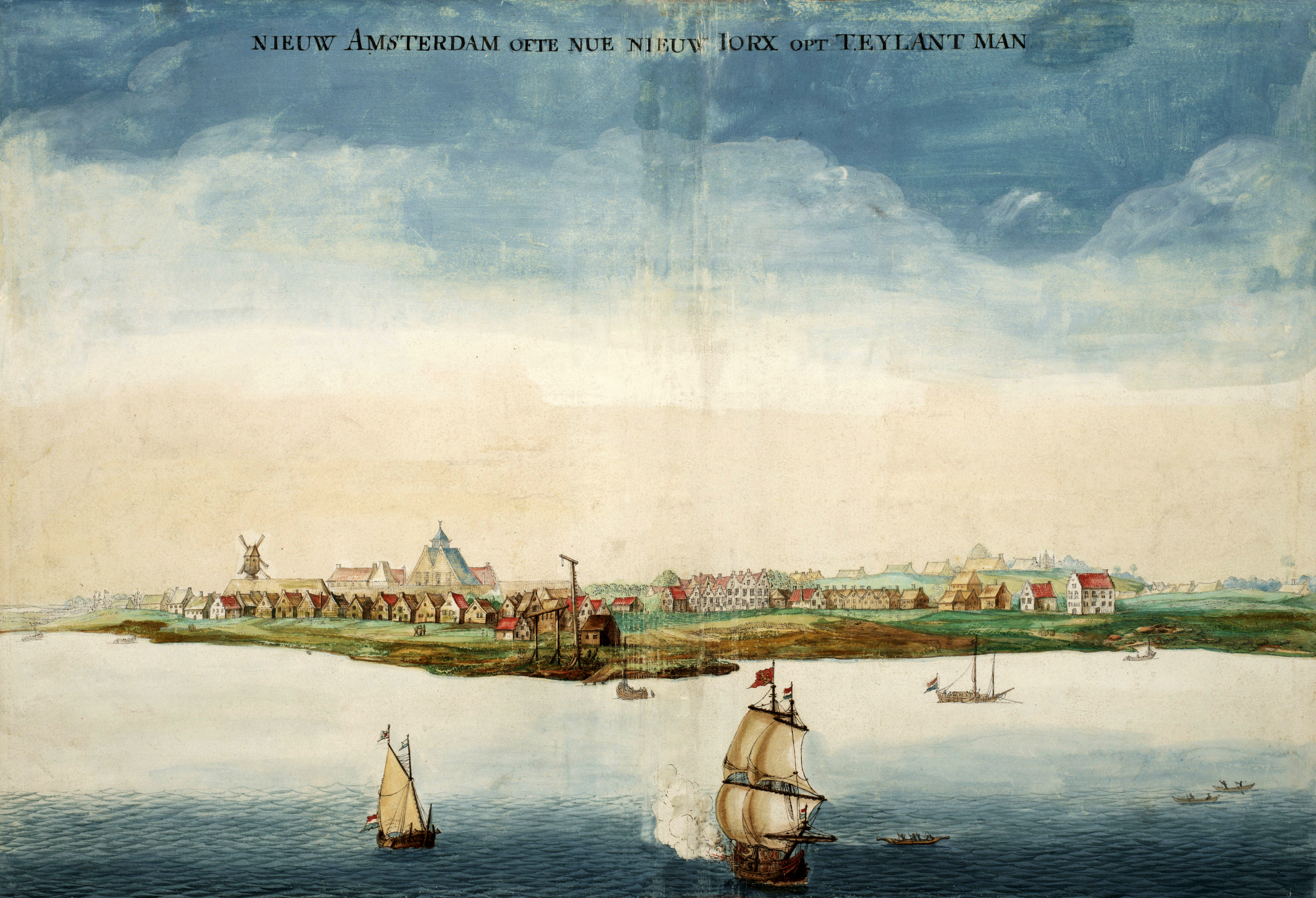
New Amsterdam in 1664 (looking approximately due north)

Verhulst, with his council, was responsible for the selection of Manhattan as a permanent place of settlement and for situating Fort Amsterdam. He was replaced as the company director of New Netherland by Peter Minuit in 1626. According to the writer Nathaniel Benchley, to legally safeguard the settlers' investments, possessions and farms on Manhattan island, Minuit negotiated the "purchase" of Manhattan from a band of Canarse from Brooklyn who occupied the bottom quarter of Manhattan, known then as the Manhattoes, for 60 guilders' worth of trade goods. Minuit conducted the transaction with the Canarse chief Seyseys, who was only too happy to accept valuable merchandise in exchange for an island that was actually mostly controlled by the Weckquaesgeeks.

An official letter of November 7, 1626 in which Pieter Schagen informed the States General of the purchase (by Peter Minuit) of Manhattan Island ("'t eylant Manhettes", groot 11000 morgen) from the "wilden" (wild ones). This area amounts to 36 square miles (94 km^{2}). Schagen also mentioned the successful first harvest and the shipload of 7,246 beaver skins (Nationaal Archief, The Hague). For a transcription of the text, see Schagenbrief and Transcriptie Schagenbrief

The deed itself has not survived, so the specific details are unknown. A textual reference to the deed became the foundation for the legend that Minuit had purchased Manhattan from the Native Americans for twenty-four dollars' worth of trinkets and beads, the guilder rate at the time being about two and a half to a Spanish dollar. The price of 60 Dutch guilders in 1626 amounts to around $1,100 in 2012 dollars. Further complicating the calculation is that the value of goods in the area would have been different from the value of those same goods in the developed market of the Netherlands.

The Dutch introduced windmills first at Noten Eylandt for a sawmill, to exploit the stand of hardwoods found there. Later they exploited the hydropower of existing creeks by constructing mills at Turtle Bay (between present-day East 45th–48th Streets) and Montagne's Kill, later called Harlem Mill Creek (East 108th Street). In 1639 a sawmill was located in the northern forest at what was later the corner of East 74th Street and Second Avenue, at which African slaves cut lumber.

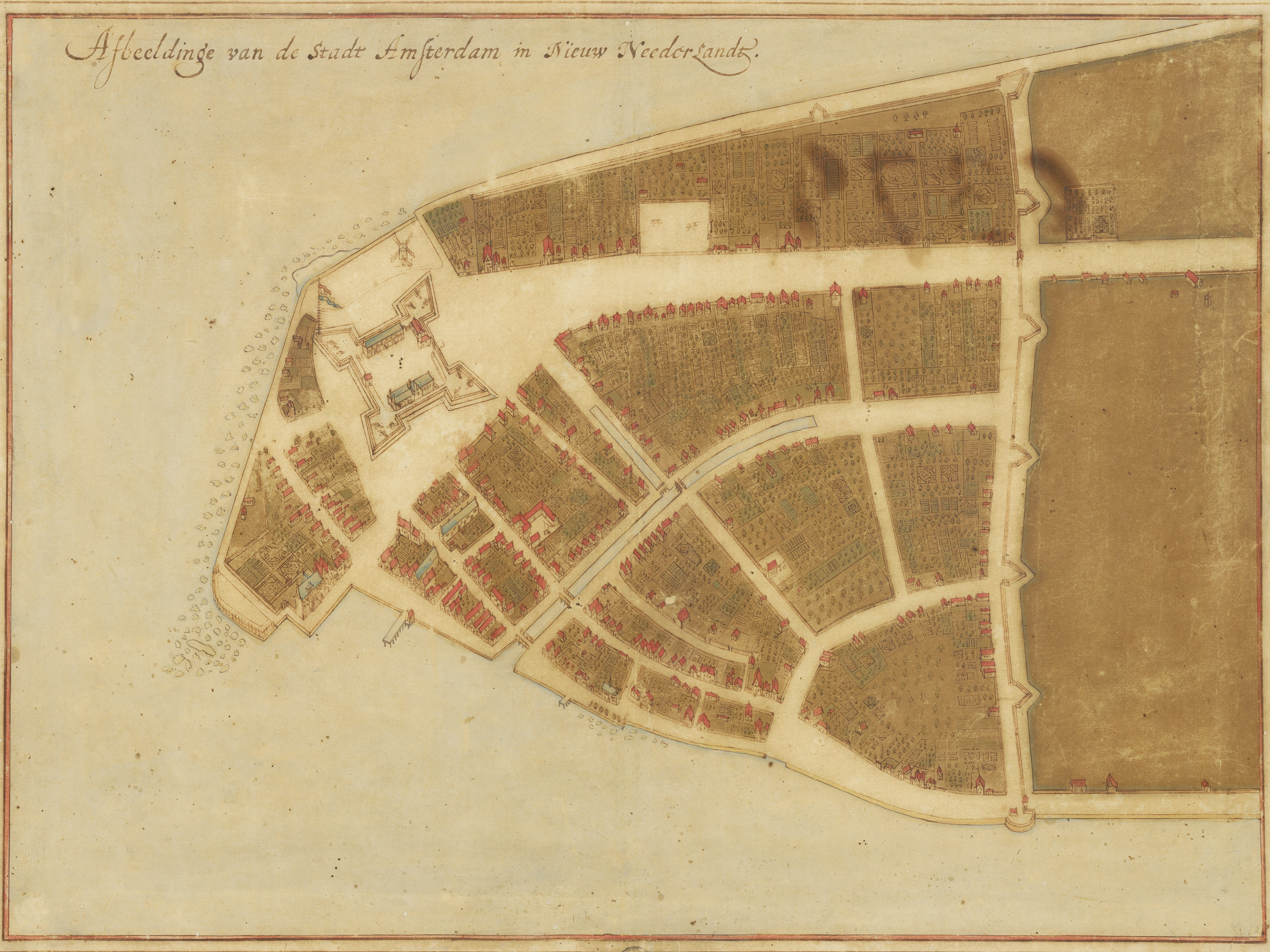
The Castello Plan, a 1660 map of New Amsterdam (the top right corner is roughly north). The fort gave The Battery (in present-day Manhattan) its name, the large street going from the fort past the wall became Broadway, and the city wall (right) gave Wall Street its name.

The New Amsterdam settlement had a population of approximately 270 people, including infants. In 1642 the new director Willem Kieft decided to build a stone church within the fort. The work was carried out by recent English immigrants, the brothers John and Richard Ogden. The church was finished in 1645 and stood until destroyed in the Slave Insurrection of 1741. The church also hosted services in French for Walloon and Huguenot refugees. The French-speaking congregation later separated as the French Church du Saint-Esprit.

A pen-and-ink view of New Amsterdam, drawn on-the-spot and discovered in the map collection of the Austrian National Library in Vienna in 1991, provides a unique view of New Amsterdam as it appeared from Capske (small Cape) Rock in 1648. It was associated with Adriaen van der Donck's Remonstrance of New Netherland, and may have inspired later views as by Claes Jansz. Visscher. Capske Rock was situated in the water close to Manhattan between Manhattan and Noten Eylant, and signified the start of the East River roadstead.

New Amsterdam received municipal rights by a charter from New Netherland Governor Peter Stuyvesant on February 2, 1653, thus becoming a city.

Albany, then named Beverwyck, received its city rights in 1652. Nieuw Haarlem, now known as Harlem, was formally recognized in 1658.

The first Dutch Jews known to have arrived in New Amsterdam arrived in 1654. First to arrive were Solomon Pietersen and Jacob Barsimson, who sailed during the summer of 1654 directly from Holland, with passports that gave them permission to trade in the colony. Then in early September, 23 Jewish refugees arrived from the Brazilian city of Recife, which had been conquered by the Portuguese in January 1654. The director-general of New Netherland, Peter Stuyvesant, sought to turn them away but was ultimately overruled by the directors of the Dutch West India Company in Amsterdam. Asser Levy, an Ashkenazi Jew who was one of the 23 refugees, eventually prospered and in 1661 became the first Jew to own a house in New Amsterdam, which also made him the first Jew known to have owned a house anywhere in North America.

On September 15, 1655, New Amsterdam was occupied by several hundred Munsee, possibly in response to a Dutch colonist killing a woman stealing peaches from his orchard. No bloodshed occurred until the Munsee were fired upon as they were preparing to depart. This triggered attacks on Pavonia and Staten Island. Stuyvesant reported 28 farms destroyed, 40 deaths and 100 captives taken in what later became known as the Peach War.

In 1661, the Communipaw ferry was founded and began a long history of trans-Hudson ferry and ultimately rail and road transportation.

In 1664, Jan van Bonnel built a Saw mill on East 74th Street and the East River, where an 8.52-mile (13,710 m) long stream that began in the north of today's Central Park, which became known as the Saw Kill or Saw Kill Creek, emptied into the river. Later owners of the property George Elphinstone and Abraham Shotwell replaced the sawmill with a leather mill in 1677. The Saw Kill was later redirected into a culvert, arched over, and its trickling little stream was called Arch Brook.

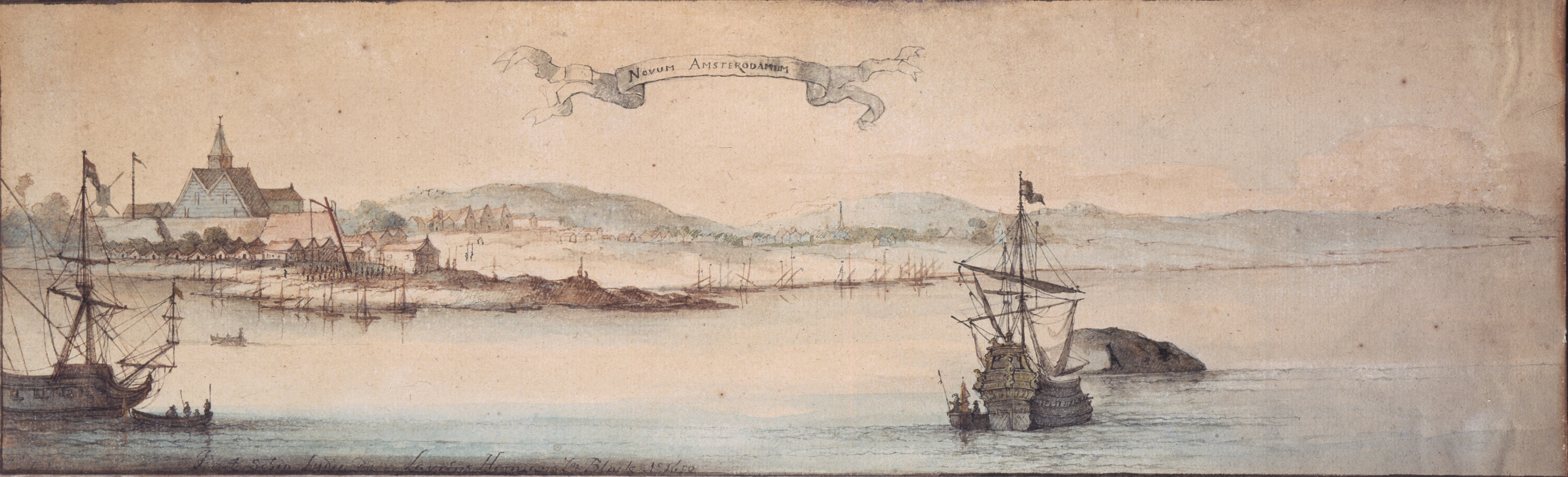
Novum Amsterodamum 1650, by Laurens Block

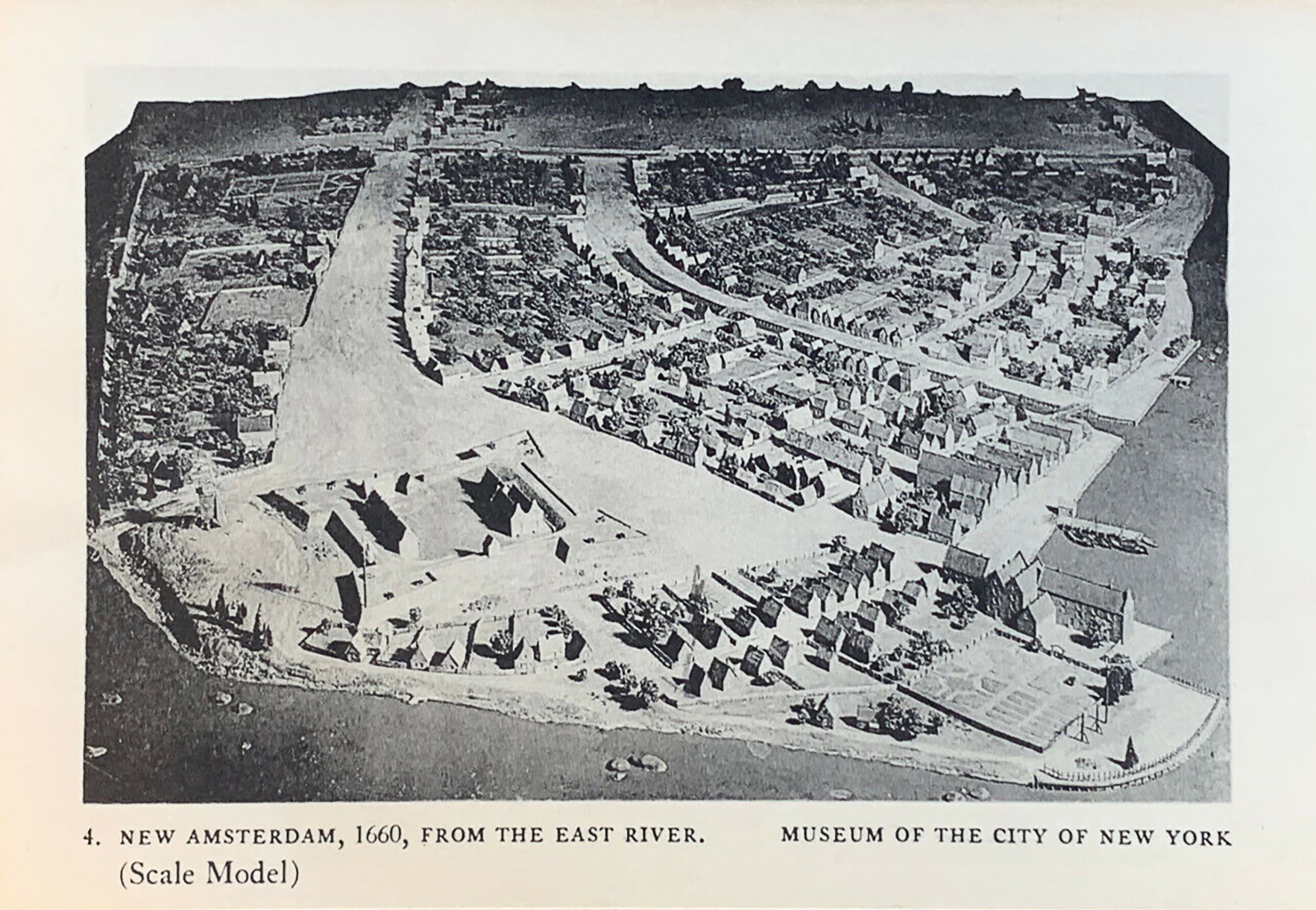
Scale model of New Amsterdam in 1660

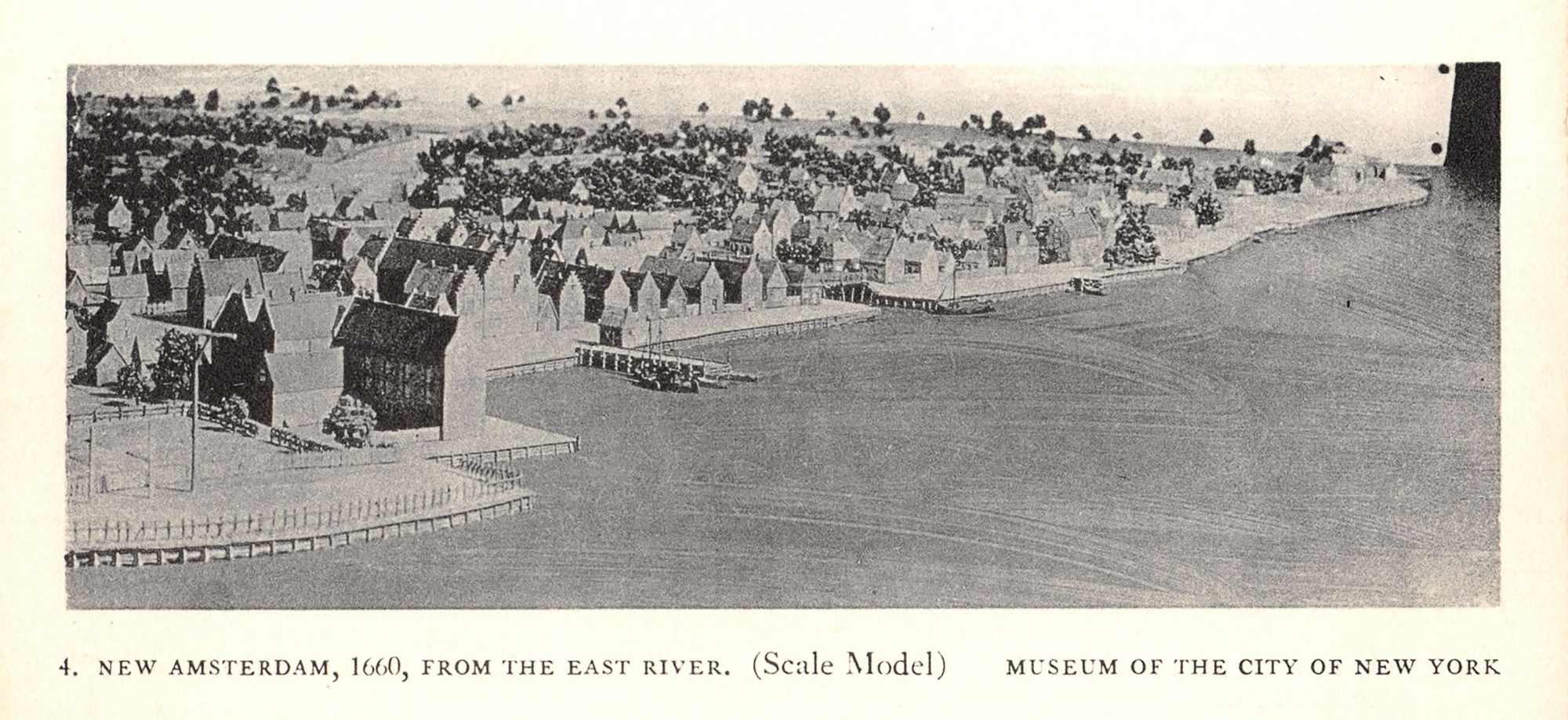
New Amsterdam from the East River in 1660, Scale Model

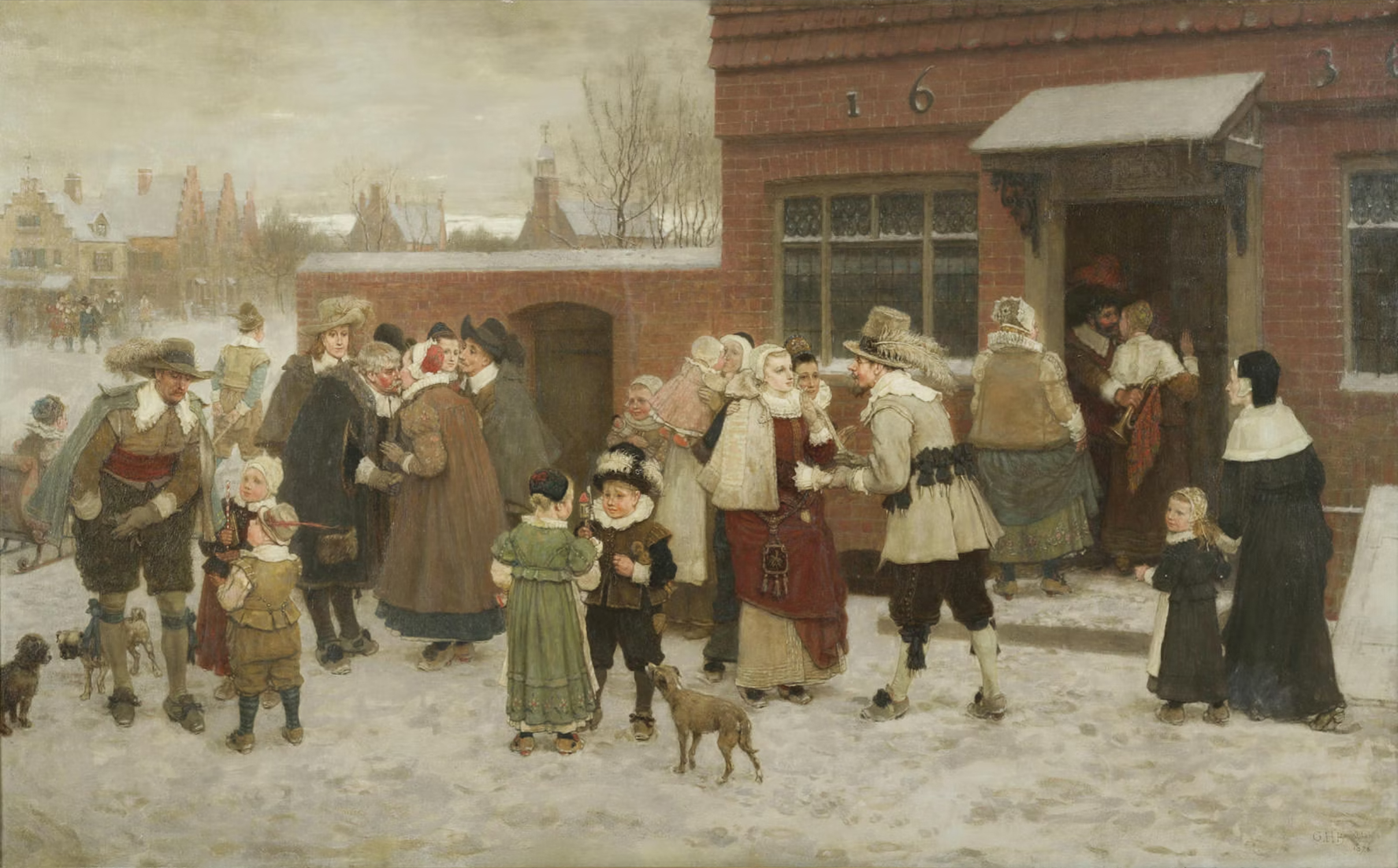
Party For New Year's Day In New Amsterdam 1636 (George Boughton)

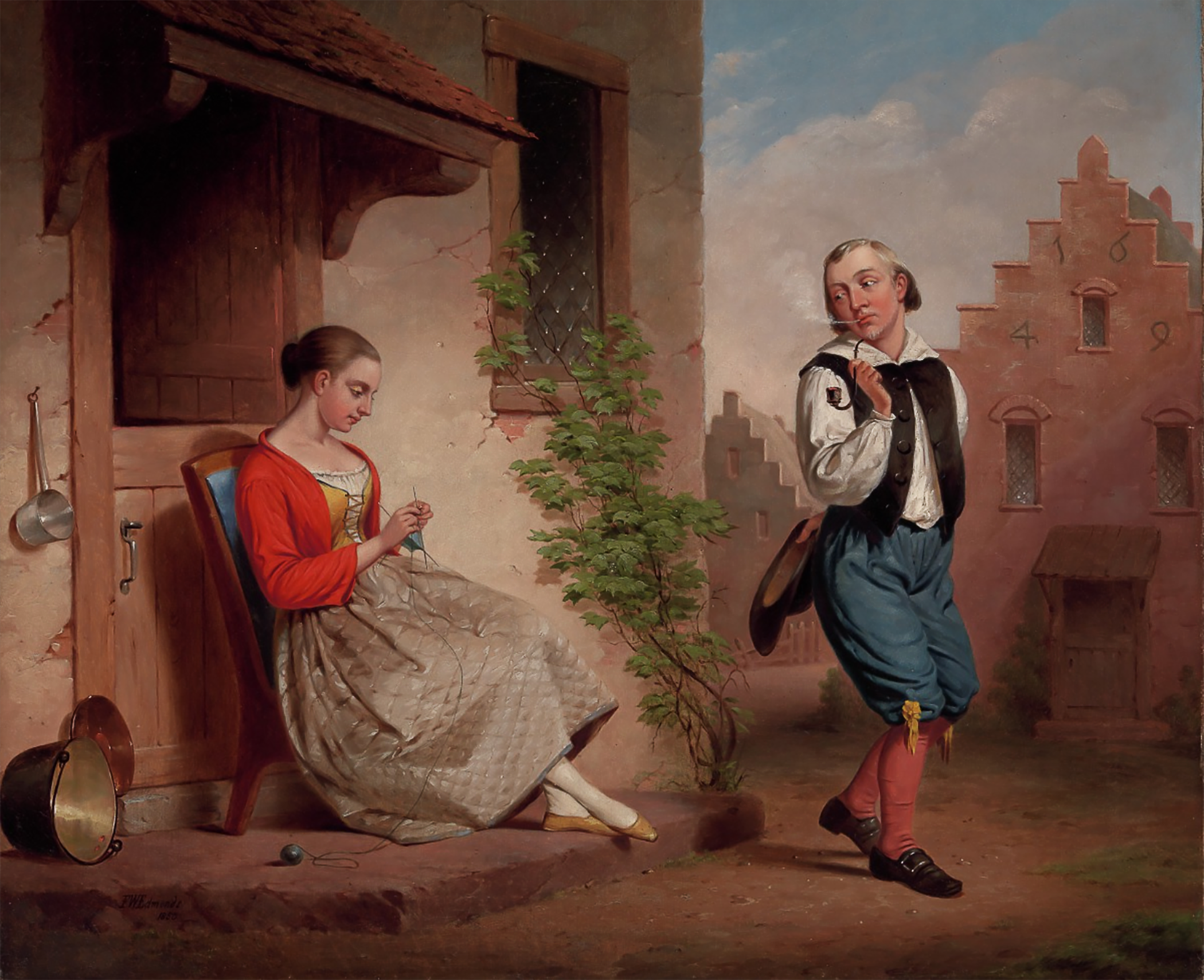
Courtship in New Amsterdam (Fancis W. Edmonds)

=== English capture ===
On August 27, 1664, while England and the Dutch Republic were at peace, four English frigates sailed into New Amsterdam's harbor and demanded New Netherland's surrender, effecting the bloodless capture of New Amsterdam. On September 6, the local Dutch deciding not to offer resistance, Stuyvesant's lawyer Johannes de Decker and five other delegates signed the official Articles of Surrender of New Netherland. This was swiftly followed by the Second Anglo-Dutch War, between England and the Dutch Republic. In June 1665, New Amsterdam was reincorporated under English law as New York City, named after the Duke of York (later King James II). He was the brother of King Charles II, who had been granted the lands.

In 1667, the Treaty of Breda ended the conflict in favor of the Dutch. The Dutch did not press their claims on New Netherland but did demand control over the valuable sugar plantations and factories captured by them that year on the coast of Surinam, giving them full control over the coast of what is now Guyana and Suriname.

On August 9, 1673, during the Third Anglo-Dutch War, the Dutch quickly but briefly retook the colony of New Netherland, which the English called "New York", with a combined fleet of a squadron of ships from Amsterdam and a squadron of ships from Zeeland. The commanders were Jacob Benckes (Koudum, 1637–1677) and Cornelis Evertsen de Jongste (Vlissingen, 1642–1706) under instruction of the States General of the Dutch Republic. Anthony Colve was installed as the first Dutch governor of the province. Previously there had only been West India Company Directors and a Director-General.

Amidst the recapture, New York City would be again renamed, this time to New Orange. However, after the signing of the Treaty of Westminster in February 1674, both the Dutch territories were relinquished to the English. With the effective transfer of control on November 10, 1674, the names New Netherland and New Orange reverted to the English versions of "New York" and "New York City", respectively. Suriname became an official Dutch possession in return.

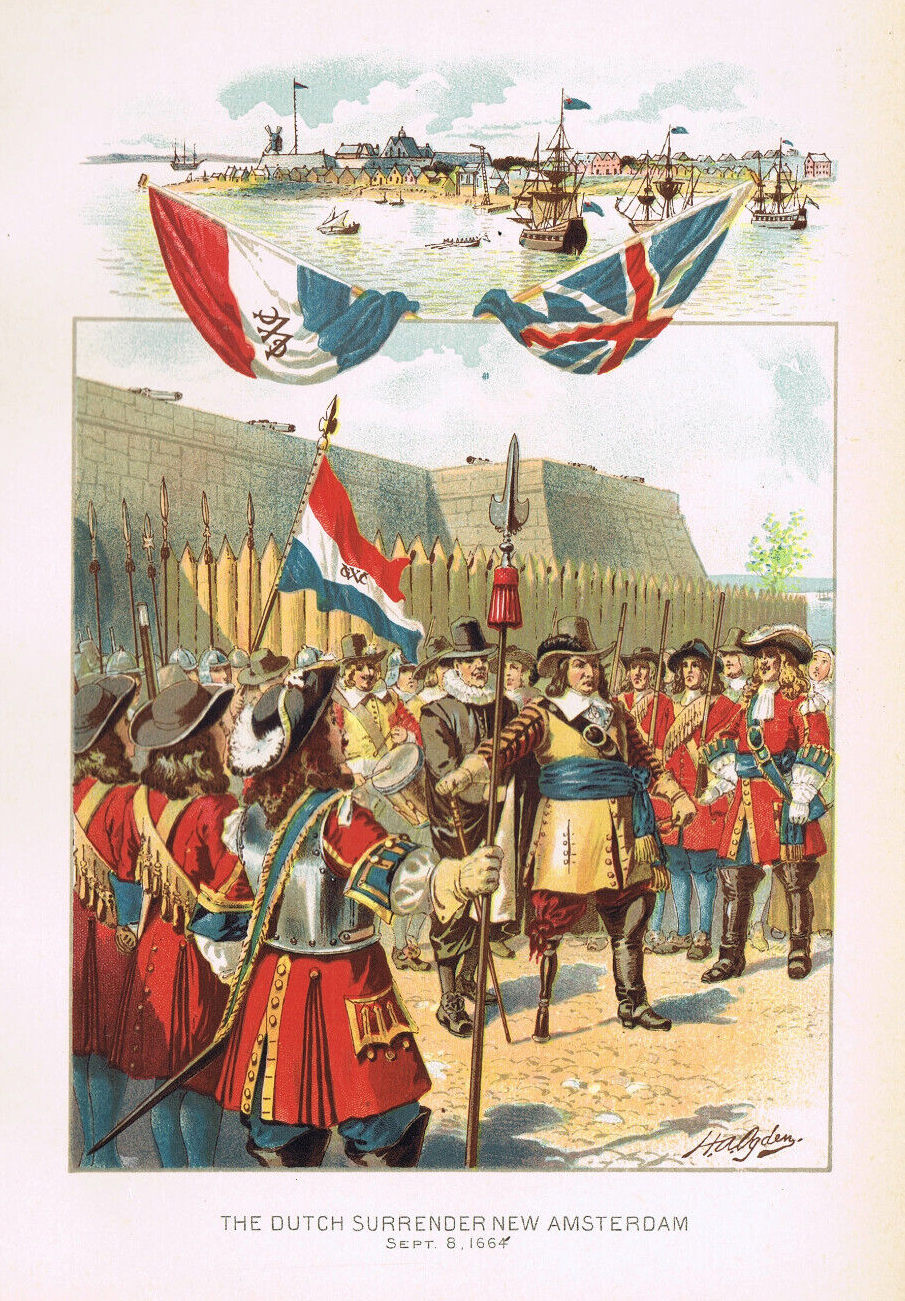
The Dutch surrender New Amsterdam in 1664

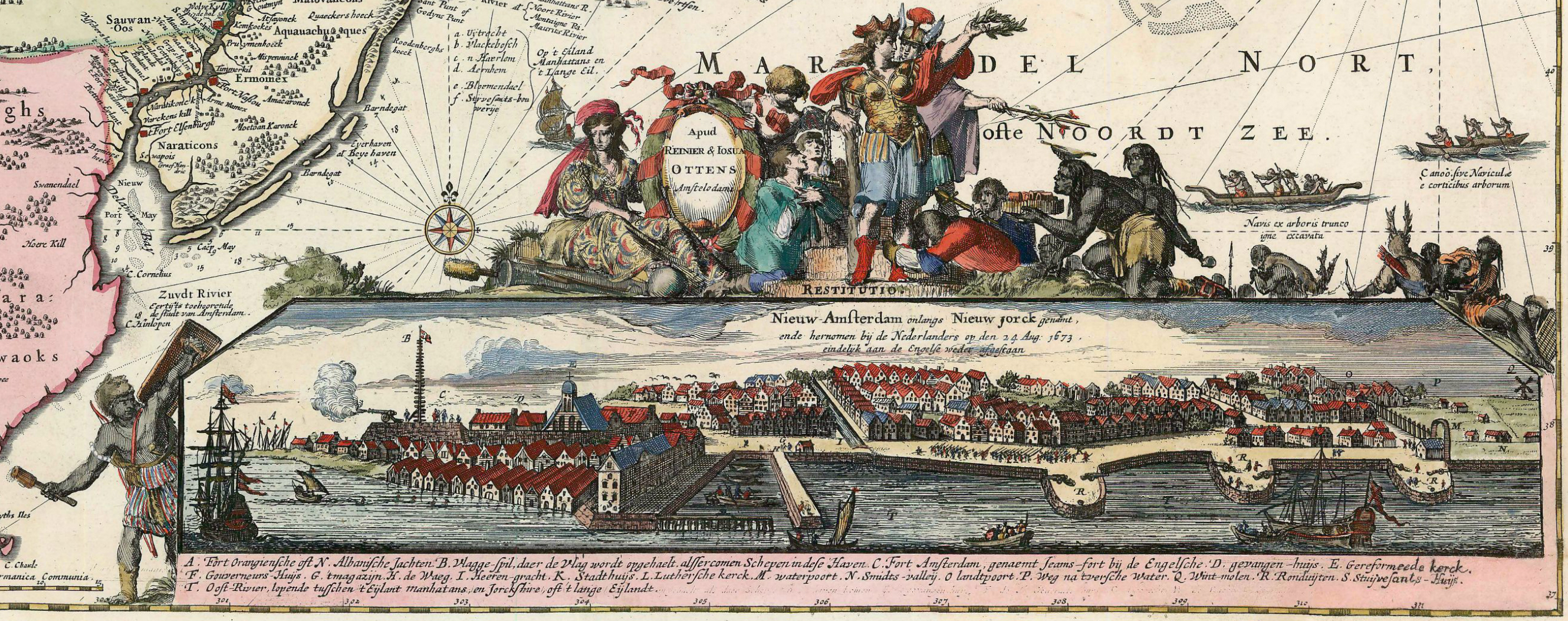
The Reconquest of New Netherland

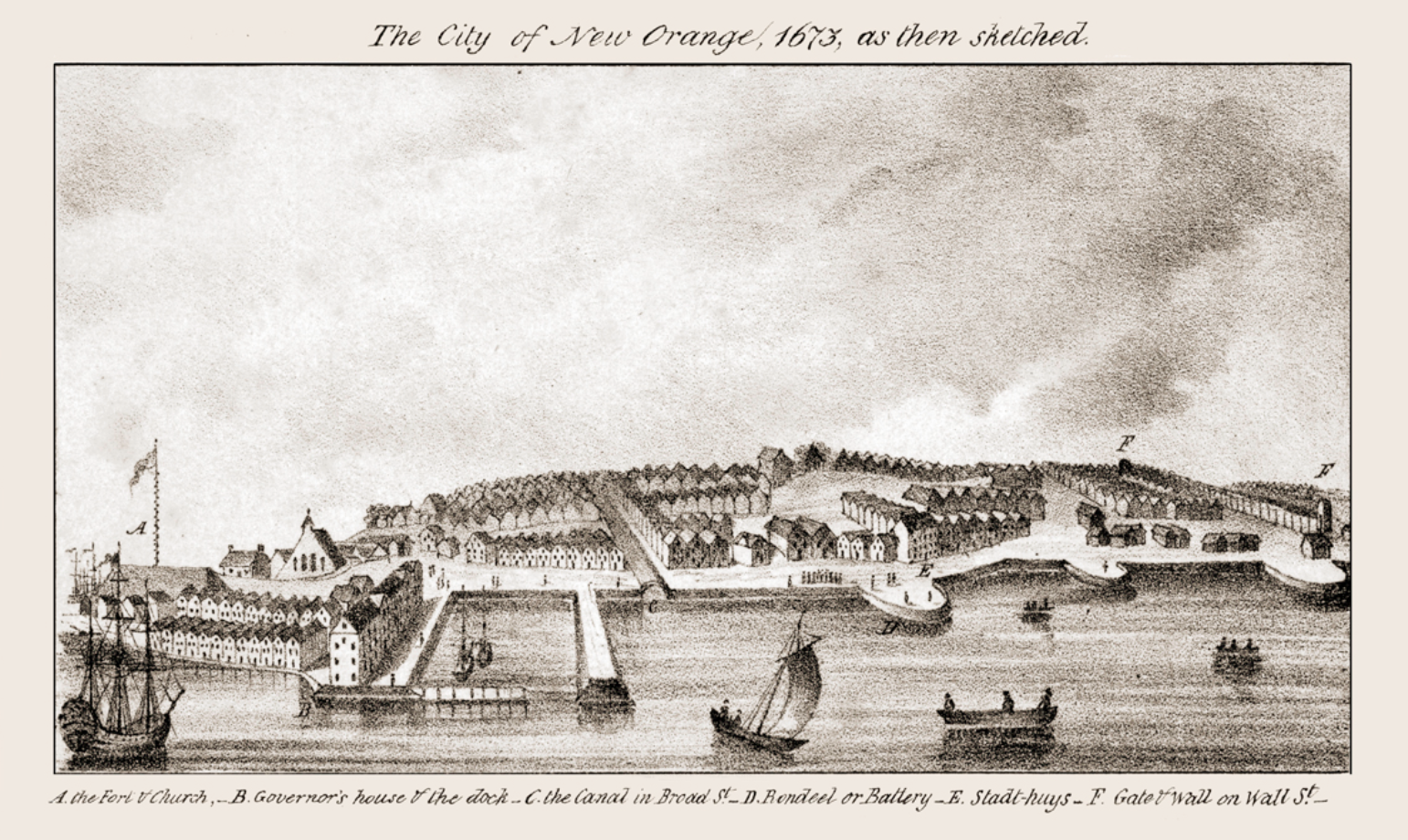
City of New Orange in 1673

== Cartography ==
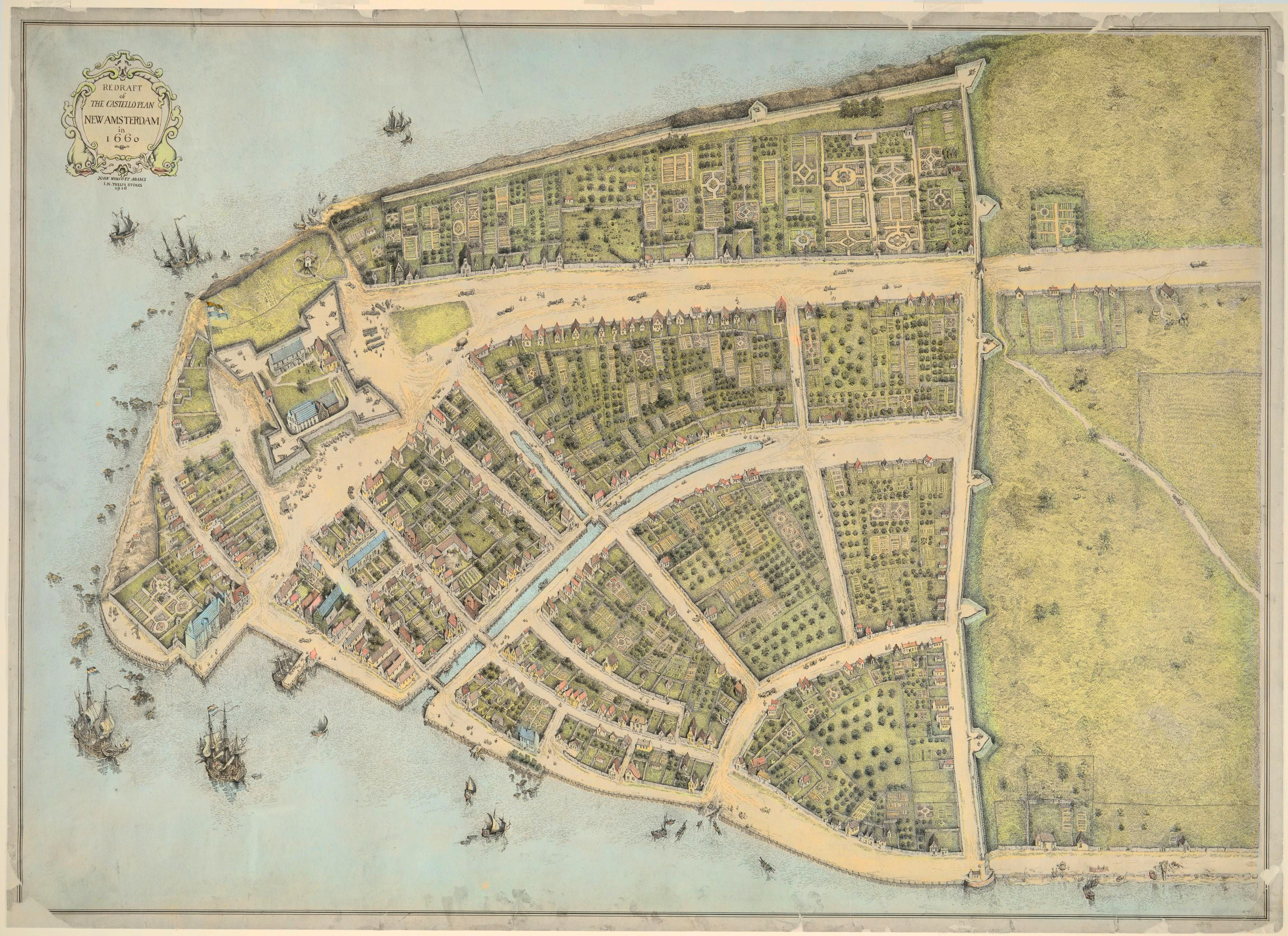
Redraft of the Castello Plan (colored), drawn in 1916

The beginnings of New Amsterdam, unlike most other colonies in the New World, were thoroughly documented in city maps. During the time of New Netherland's colonization, the Dutch were the pre-eminent cartographers in Europe. The delegated authority of the Dutch West India Company over New Netherland required maintaining sovereignty on behalf of the States General, generating cash flow through commercial enterprise for its shareholders, and funding the province's growth. Thus its directors regularly required that censuses be taken. These tools to measure and monitor the province's progress were accompanied by accurate maps and plans. These surveys, as well as grassroots activities to seek redress of grievances, account for the existence of some of the most important of the early documents.

There is a particularly detailed city map called the Castello Plan produced in 1660. Virtually every structure in New Amsterdam at the time is believed to be represented, and by cross-referencing the Nicasius de Sille List of 1660, which enumerates all the citizens of New Amsterdam and their addresses, it can be determined who resided in every house.

The city map known as the Duke's Plan probably derived from the same 1660 census as the Castello Plan. The Duke's Plan includes two outlying areas of development on Manhattan along the top of the plan. The work was created for James (1633–1701), the Duke of York and Albany, after whom New York, New York City, and New York's Capital – Albany, were named just after the seizure of New Amsterdam by the English. After that provisional relinquishment of New Netherland, Stuyvesant reported to his superiors that he "had endeavored to promote the increase of population, agriculture and commerce...the flourishing condition which might have been more flourishing if the now afflicted inhabitants had been protected by a suitable garrison...and had been helped with the long sought for settlement of the boundary, or in default thereof had they been seconded with the oft besought reinforcement of men and ships against the continual troubles, threats, encroachments and invasions of the British neighbors and government of Hartford Colony, our too powerful enemies".

The existence of these city maps has proven to be very useful in the archaeology of New York City. For instance, the Castello map aided the excavation of the Stadthuys (City Hall) of New Amsterdam in determining the exact location of the building.

=== Layout ===
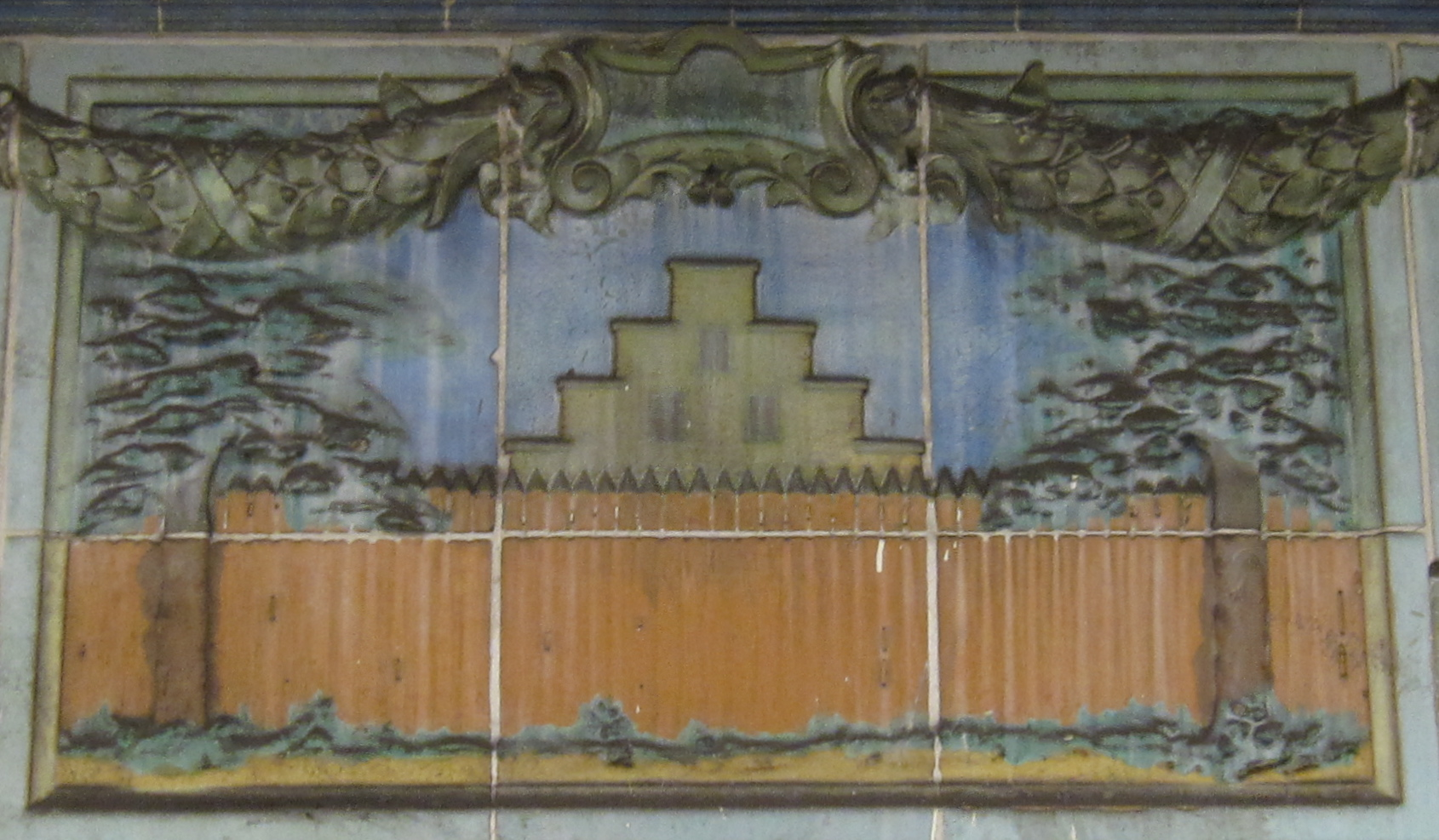
Depiction of the wall of New Amsterdam on a tile in the Wall Street subway station

The maps enable a precise reconstruction of the town. Fort Amsterdam was located at the southernmost tip of the island of Manhattan, which today is surrounded by Bowling Green. The Battery is a reference to its battery of cannon.

Broadway was the main street that led out of town north towards Harlem. The town was surrounded to the north by a wall leading from the eastern to the western shore. Today, where the course of this city wall was, is Wall Street. Nearby, a canal which led from the harbor inland was filled in 1676, and is today Broad Street.

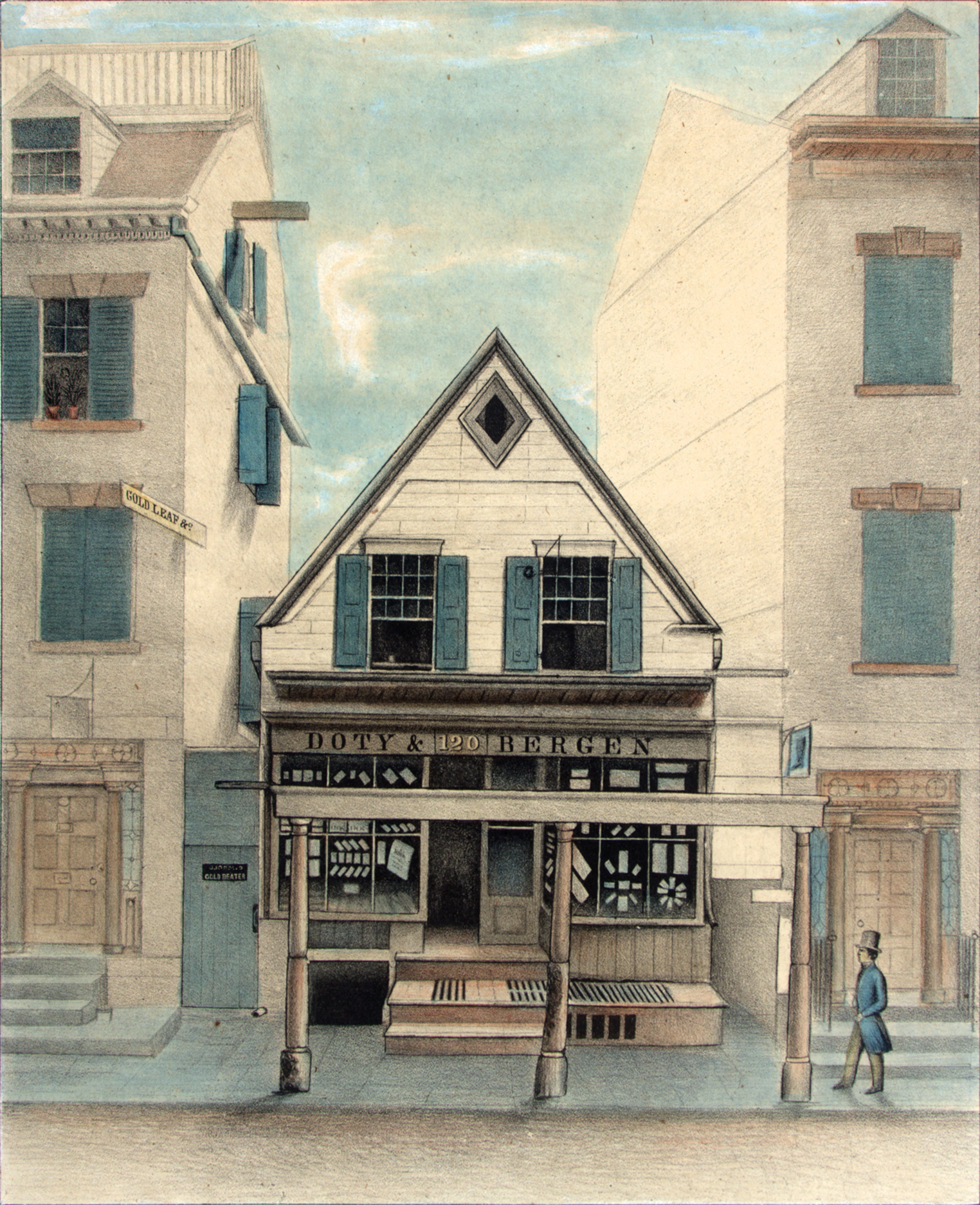
The Rigging House, 120 William Street, in 1846. It was a Methodist church in the 1760s, then a secular building again before its demolition in the mid-19th century.

The layout of the streets was winding, as in a European city. Only starting from Wall Street going toward uptown did the typical grid become enforced long after the town ceased to be Dutch. Most of the Financial District overlaps with New Amsterdam and has retained its original street layout.

== Legacy ==
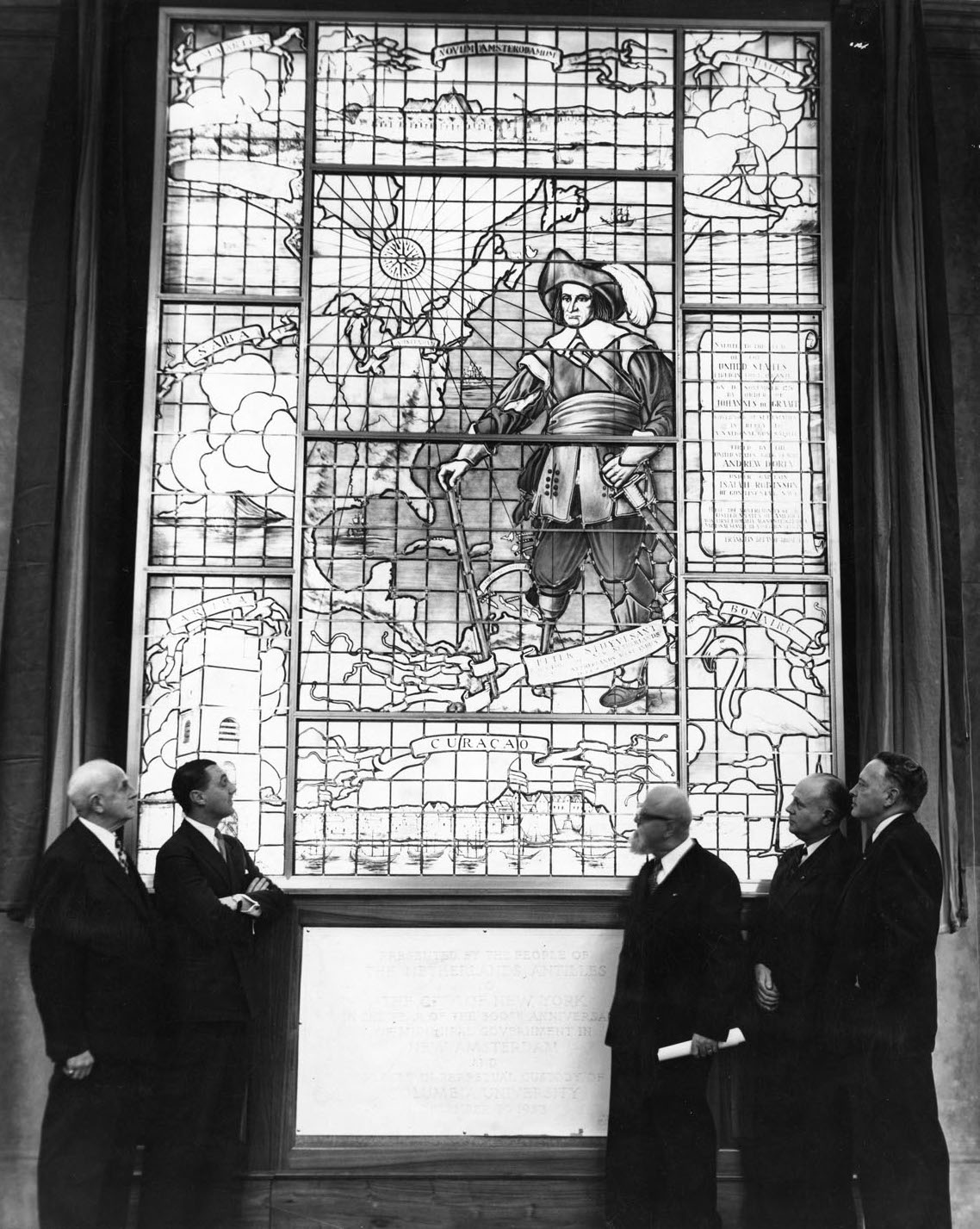
The 1954 unveiling of a stained-glass depiction of Peter Stuyvesant in Butler Library at Columbia University. It commemorated the 300th anniversary of the founding of New Amsterdam, though it was actually dedicated on its 329th anniversary according to the date on the Seal of New York City, or on the 301st anniversary of the city receiving municipal rights.

The 1625 date of the founding of New Amsterdam is now commemorated in the official Seal of New York City. (Formerly, the year on the seal was 1664, the year of the provisional Articles of Transfer, assuring New Netherlanders that they "shall keep and enjoy the liberty of their consciences in religion", negotiated with the English by Peter Stuyvesant and his council.)

Sometimes considered a dysfunctional trading post by the English who later acquired it from the Dutch, Russell Shorto, author of The Island at the Center of the World, suggests that the city left its cultural marks on later New York and, by extension, the United States as a whole.

Major recent historical research has been based on a set of documents that have survived from that period, untranslated. They are the administrative records of the colony, unreadable by most scholars. Since the 1970s, Charles Gehring of the New Netherland Institute has made it his life's work to translate this first-hand history of the Colony of New Netherland.

The scholarly conclusion has largely been that the settlement of New Amsterdam is much more like current New York than previously thought. Cultural diversity and a mindset that resembles the American Dream were already present in the first few years of this colony. Writers like Russell Shorto argue that the large influence of New Amsterdam on the American psyche has largely been overlooked in the classic telling of American beginnings, because of animosity between the English victors and the conquered Dutch.

The original 17th-century architecture of New Amsterdam has completely vanished (affected by the fires of 1776 and 1835), leaving only archaeological remnants. The original street plan of New Amsterdam has stayed largely intact, as have some houses outside Manhattan.

The presentation of the legacy of the unique culture of 17th-century New Amsterdam remains a concern of preservationists and educators. In 2009 the National Park Service celebrated the 400th anniversary of Henry Hudson's 1609 voyage on behalf of the Dutch with the New Amsterdam Trail.

The Dutch-American historian and journalist Hendrik Willem van Loon wrote in 1933 a work of alternative history entitled "If the Dutch Had Kept Nieuw Amsterdam" (in If, Or History Rewritten, edited by J. C. Squire, 1931, Simon & Schuster).

A similar theme, at greater length, was taken up by writer Elizabeth Bear, who published the "New Amsterdam" series of detective stories that take place in a world where the city remained Dutch until the Napoleonic Wars and retained its name also afterward.

One of New York's Broadway theatres is the New Amsterdam Theatre. The name New Amsterdam is also written on the architrave situated on top of the row of columns in front of the Manhattan Municipal Building, commemorating the name of the Dutch colony.

Although no architectural monuments or buildings have survived, the legacy lived on in the form of Dutch Colonial Revival architecture. A number of structures in New York City were constructed in the 19th and 20th centuries in this style, such as Wallabout Market in Brooklyn, South William Street in Manhattan, West End Collegiate Church at West 77th Street, and others.

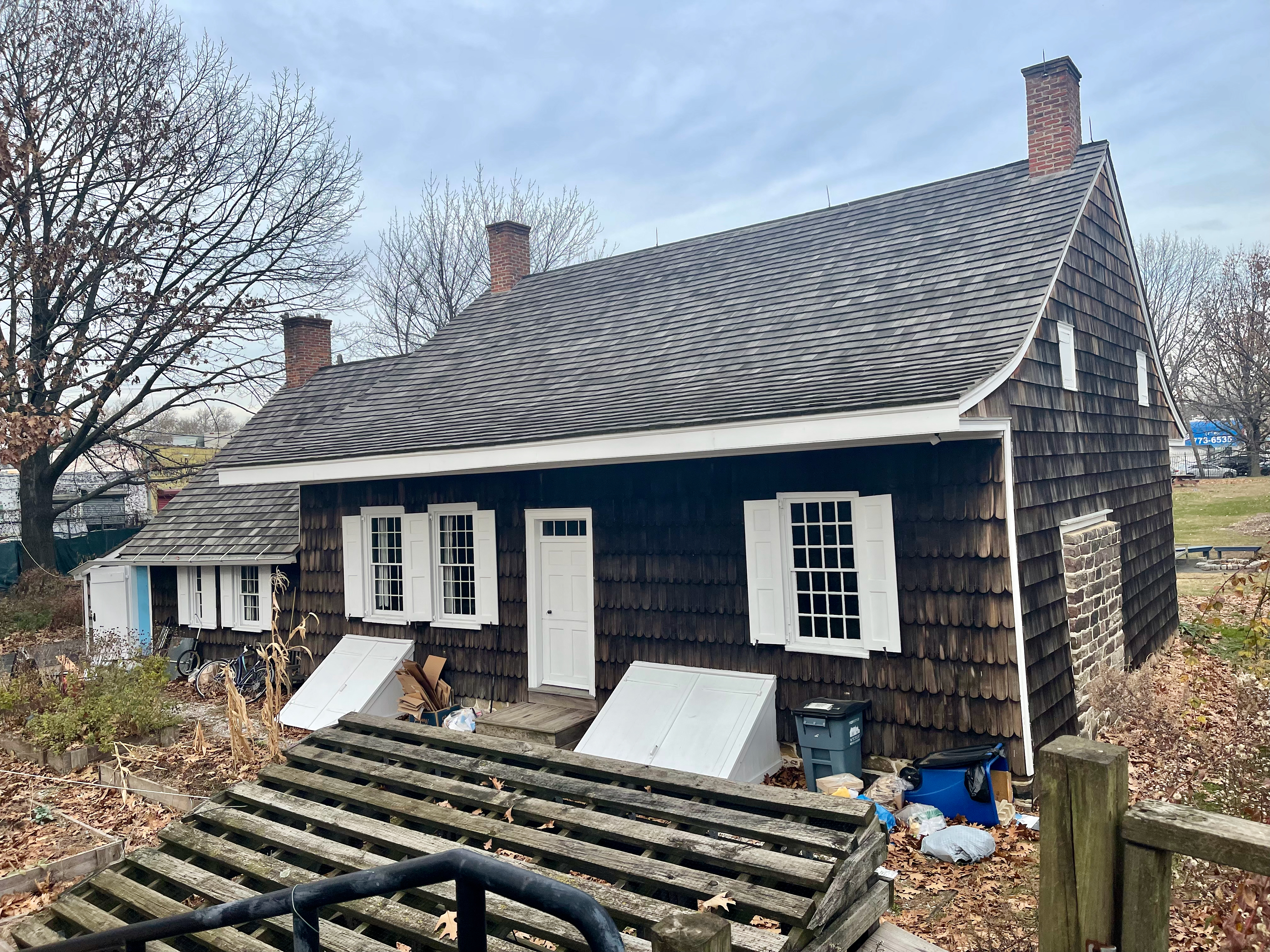
The Wyckoff Farm in Flatbush, Brooklyn. Some of its construction still dates from the Dutch period of what is currently New York City.

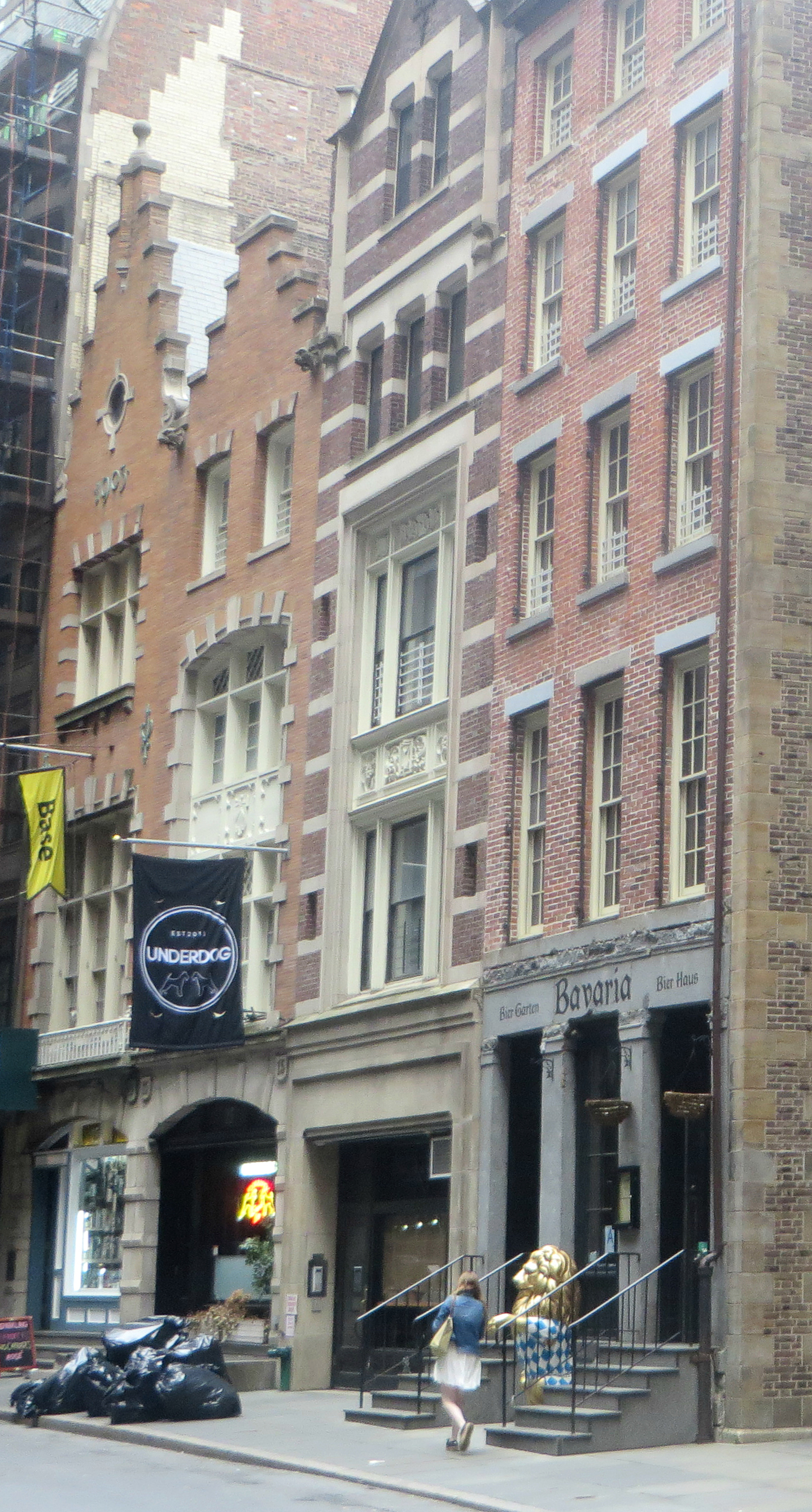
13–15 South William Street, constructed in the Dutch Colonial Revival architecture evoking New Amsterdam

== See also ==
- van Dam
- Jacobus van de Water
