= Small Time =

Small Time may refer to:

- Small Time (1996 film), a film by Shane Meadows
- Small Time (2014 film), a film by Joel Surnow
- Small Time (album), an album by The Servants
- The Small Time, an album by Grey DeLisle
- Smalltime, a 2021 memoir by Russell Shorto
