= Smalltime =

2021 book by Russell Shorto

Smalltime: A Story of My Family and the Mob
- Author: Russell Shorto
- Language: English
- Subject: family memoir
- Publisher: W. W. Norton & Company
- Publication date: February 1, 2021 (paperback); February 2, 2021 (hardcover)
- Pages: 272
- ISBN: 978-0-393-24558-5

Smalltime: A Story of My Family and the Mob is a 2021 memoir by Russell Shorto that examines his family's involvement in organized crime. The book centers on Shorto's grandfather, Russ, son of an Italian immigrant to the United States who once served as second in command for the mob in Johnstown, Pennsylvania. Shorto stated his mother's cousin, who worked as a numbers runner for his grandfather, asked him to write the book. During prohibition, Russ ran alcohol and built a "small city empire" around Johnstown, with money going to the Mafia in New York City and some to the mob in Pittsburgh. The book follows Russ after the World War II years as he organized gambling operations in the city. Smalltime concludes with Shorto examining his relationship with his father, Tony.

The book received mostly positive reviews upon release. Multiple reviewers noted Shorto wrote a book mainly on family dynamics, which also happened to deal with the mob.

== Author and background ==
The author of the book is Russell Shorto, an American historian, journalist, and writer. Born in Johnstown, Pennsylvania, where he was also raised, Shorto studied philosophy and journalism at George Washington University. City Journal described him as a narrative history writer, with books previously published on the Dutch history of Manhattan and Amsterdam. Shorto stated his mother's cousin, who worked as a numbers runner for Shorto's grandfather, asked him to write the book. W. W. Norton & Company published Smalltime, with the paperback released worldwide on February 1, 2021, and the hardcover released a day later.

== Overview ==
The book centers around Shorto's grandfather, Russ, son of an Italian immigrant who works with the mob in Johnstown, Pennsylvania. During Prohibition in the United States, Russ ran alcohol and built a "small city empire" around Johnstown, with money going to the Mafia in New York City and some to the mob in Pittsburgh. The book follows Russ after the World War II years as he organized gambling operations in the city. Smalltime concludes with Shorto examining his relationship with his father, Tony.

== Reception ==
Multiple reviewers noted Shorto wrote a book mainly on family dynamics, which also happened to deal with the mob. In the Pittsburgh Post-Gazette, journalist and radio host Bill O'Driscoll called the book a cogent and detailed primer on the mob, though the true power in the book came through the author's relationship with his father, about whom he learns the reasons why he did not end up therein. In The Wall Street Journal, Bryan Burrough felt the mafia media space already crowded by other memoirs such as one by Al Capone's alleged grandson, but called Shorto's book fresh, which surprised him. James Pekoll of Booklist called the book a fresh take on an interesting part to American history.

Former museum division director of the Heinz History Center Bill Keyes reviewed the book in Western Pennsylvania History, stating Russell's conversations with his father and his associates dispelled rumors about Russ's criminal career while illustrating the author's own relationship with his father. Keyes called the book moving and unstinting. On Shorto's interviews with his grandfather's associates, journalist Joe Heim of The Washington Post stated his grandfather appears flat as the interviews do not penetrate the surface of who his grandfather was, though the talks themselves are long. Similarly, Heim states the book does not have enough substance on the author's grandfather to make it one the reader could not put down, though when the book focused on Russell's relationship with his father, it resolved well.

Helene Stapinski of The New York Times called the book a family dynamics story, not really one about mobs– and noted the real revelations in the story came from the lives Russ ruined and manipulated. Charles F. McElwee of City Journal agreed with Stapinski's take on family dynamics, and described Russ as "holy trinity of a reprobate—a drunk, a philanderer, and a cheat whose family and friends suffered from the emotional toll". Kirkus Reviews called Shorto's portrayal of local mobsters vivid. A review in Publishers Weekly concluded that "Shorto presents a fascinating institutional history of small-town organized crime and a moving family saga with equal amounts of detail and heart", and said those interested in mob history would love the book.
