= New Netherland Institute =

Institute for the preservation of Dutch colonial writings

The New Netherland Institute (formerly Friends of the New Netherland Project) is a non-profit organization created to support the translation and publication of 17th-century Dutch documents from the period of the Dutch colonization of New Netherland.

This effort began when the New Netherland Project was established in 1974 by the New York State Library and the Holland Society of New York. As of 2013, it had translated over 7,000 pages of documents. The institute also supports the New Netherland Research Center, which opened in 2010 at the New York State Library.

One of the primary goals of the Project is to make documentary evidence from the Dutch colony available to American scholars who are unable to read seventeenth-century Dutch, and the documents translated so far have already been used by researchers in a wide variety of disciplines. Among the better-known examples is Russell Shorto's book The Island at the Center of the World: The Epic Story of Dutch Manhattan and the Forgotten Colony that Shaped America (2004).

== See also ==
- Holland Society of New York
- The Society of Daughters of Holland Dames
