= Russell Shorto =

American author, historian, and journalist

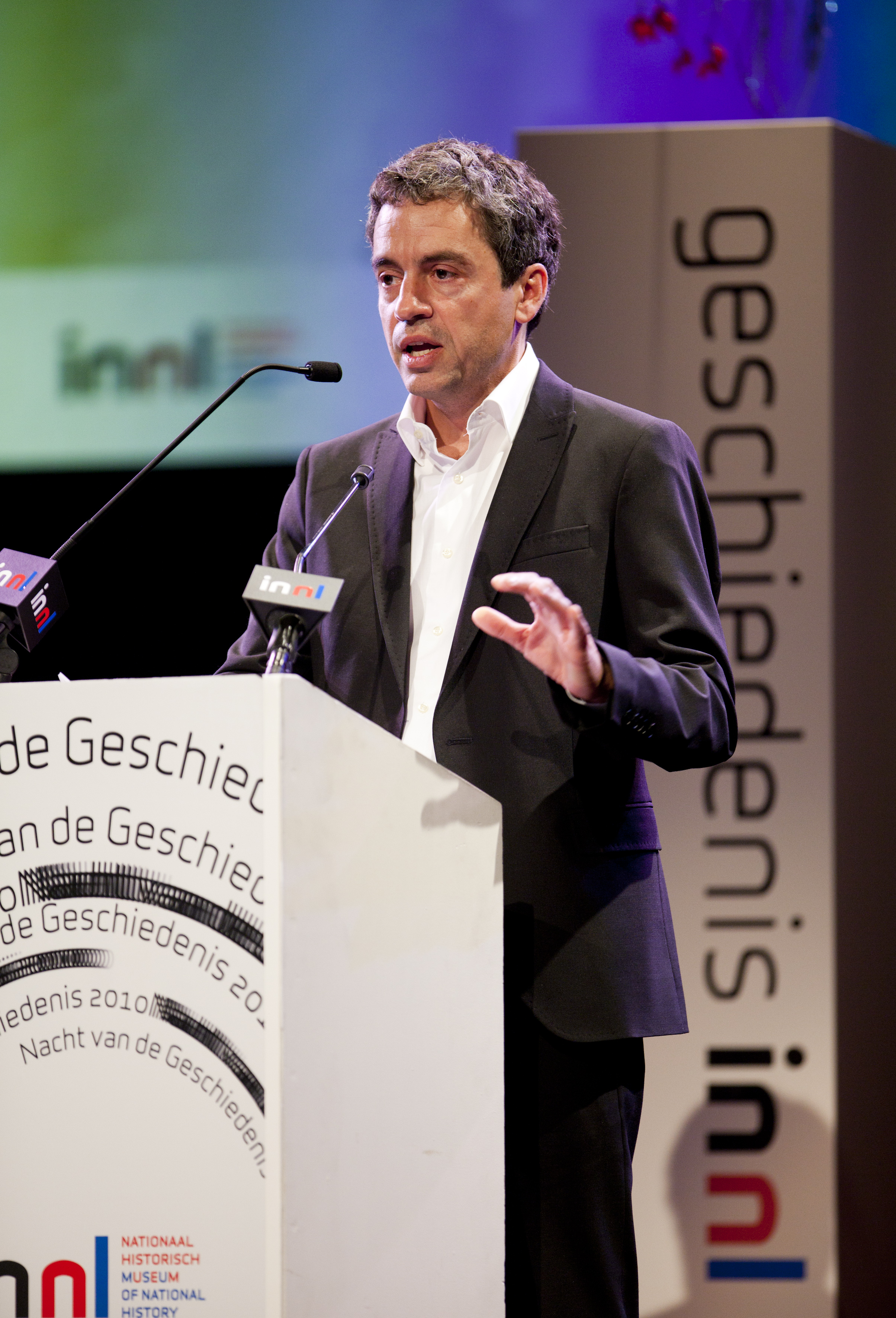
- Shorto in 2010
- Born: Russell Anthony Shorto; February 8, 1959 (age 67); Johnstown, Pennsylvania, U.S.
- Education: George Washington University
- Occupations: Author; historian; journalist
- Website: www.russellshorto.com

Russell Anthony Shorto (born February 8, 1959) is an American author, historian, and journalist. He is best known for his book on the Dutch origins of New York City, The Island at the Center of the World. Shorto's research for the book relied greatly on the work of the New Netherland Project, now known as the New Netherland Research Center, as well as the New Netherland Institute. Shorto has been the New Netherland Institute's Senior Scholar since 2013.

In November 2017, he published Revolution Song: A Story of American Freedom, which tells the story of the American Revolution through the eyes of six Americans from vastly different walks of life. His 2021 memoir Smalltime: A Story of My Family and the Mob covers Shorto's own family history and his ancestors involvement in the American Mafia in Johnstown, Pennsylvania. His most recent work published in 2025, Taking Manhattan: The Extraordinary Events That Created New York and Shaped America, continues to explore New York history into the British colonial period starting in 1664.

In 2022, Shorto founded the New Amsterdam Project at the New-York Historical Society, with a mission to promote awareness of New York's Dutch origins.

== Personal life ==
Born in Johnstown, Pennsylvania, on February 8, 1959, Shorto is a 1981 graduate of George Washington University. He is a contributing writer for The New York Times Magazine and was from 2008 to 2013 the director of the John Adams Institute in Amsterdam, where he lived from 2007 to 2013. As of 2014, Shorto resided in Cumberland, Maryland, where he wrote Revolution Song, his narrative history of the American Revolution.

On September 8, 2009, Shorto received a Dutch knighthood in the Order of Orange-Nassau for strengthening Netherlands-United States relations through his publications and as director of the John Adams Institute.

In 2018, Shorto was inducted into the New York State Writers Hall of Fame.

He is married to Pamela Twigg and has three children and three stepchildren.

== Bibliography ==
=== Books ===
- Gospel Truth: The New Image of Jesus Emerging from Science and History, and Why It Matters. ISBN 1-57322-056-6 (New York, Riverhead Books, 1997)
- Saints and Madmen: How Pioneering Psychiatrists Are Creating a New Science of the Soul. ISBN 0-8050-5902-4 (New York, Henry Holt & Company, 1999)
- The Island at the Center of the World: The Epic Story of Dutch Manhattan and the Forgotten Colony that Shaped America. ISBN 0-385-50349-0 (New York, Doubleday, 2004)
- Descartes' Bones: A Skeletal History of the Conflict Between Faith and Reason. ISBN 978-0-385-51753-9 (New York, Random House, October 14, 2008)
- Amsterdam: A History of the World's Most Liberal City. ISBN 978-1-408-70348-9 (New York, Doubleday, October 2013)
- Revolution Song: A Story of American Freedom. ISBN 978-0-393-24554-7 (New York, W. W. Norton & Company, November 7, 2017)
- Smalltime: A Story of My Family and the Mob ISBN 978-1324020172 (New York, W. W. Norton & Company, February 2021)
- Taking Manhattan: The Extraordinary Events That Created New York and Shaped America. ISBN 978-0-393-88116-5 (New York, W. W. Norton & Company, March 4, 2025)
