= The Island at the Center of the World =

Book by Russell Shorto

The Island at the Center of the World: The Epic Story of Dutch Manhattan and the Forgotten Colony That Shaped America
- Author: Russell Shorto
- Language: English
- Subject: Manhattan under Dutch colonial rule
- Published: April 12, 2005
- Publisher: Vintage Books
- Pages: 384
- ISBN: 1-4000-7867-9

The Island at the Center of the World: The Epic Story of Dutch Manhattan and the Forgotten Colony That Shaped America is a 2005 non-fiction book by American journalist Russell Shorto that examines Manhattan under Dutch colonial rule, when the territory was called New Netherland. The book discusses the conflict between Adriaen van der Donck and Peter Stuyvesant.
