= Caravaggio (disambiguation) =

Caravaggio (1571–1610) was a painter, famous for his dramatic use of lighting.

Caravaggio may also refer to:

- Caravaggio, Lombardy, Italy, a comune in the province of Bergamo
- Polidoro da Caravaggio (c. 1499 – 1543), painter best known for his now-vanished paintings on the facades of Roman houses (unrelated to the above)
- Caravaggio (1941 film), an Italian film directed by Goffredo Alessandrini
- Caravaggio (1986 film), a British film about the painter directed by Derek Jarman
- Caravaggio (2007 film), a 2007 Italian television film
- Caravaggio (restaurant), a New York City Italian restaurant
- Caravaggio (horse), thoroughbred racehorse, winner of the 2017 Commonwealth Cup
- Caravaggio (train), an electric train built by Hitachi Rail for Italian railways
- "Caravaggio", a song by Claudia Faniello for the Malta Song for Europe 2008
- David Caravaggio, a character from the novels In the Skin of a Lion and The English Patient
- Caravaggio, a character in the Canadian science fiction television series Starhunter and Starhunter 2300
- Caravaggio, a ballet by Italian choreographer Mauro Bigonzetti, with music by Bruno Moretti
