= 74th Street (Manhattan) =

West-east street in Manhattan, New York

Coordinates: 40°46′13″N 73°57′27″W

- Interactive map of 74th Street
- Maintained by: NYCDOT
- Location: Manhattan
- East end: Dead end in Upper East Side
- North: 75th Street
- South: 73rd Street

74th Street is an east–west street carrying pedestrian traffic and eastbound automotive/bicycle traffic in the New York City borough of Manhattan. It runs through the Upper East Side neighborhood (in ZIP code 10021, where it is known as East 74th Street), and the Upper West Side neighborhood (in ZIP code 10023, where it is known as West 74th Street), on both sides of Central Park.

== History ==
In 1639, Colony's Sawmill stood at the corner of East 74th Street and Second Avenue, in the Dutch village of New Amsterdam, at which enslaved African laborers cut lumber.

In 1664, the English took over Manhattan and the Dutch colony of New Amsterdam from the Dutch. English colonial Governor of the Province of New York Richard Nicolls made 74th Street, beginning at the East River, the southern border patent line (which was called the "Harlem Line") of the village of Nieuw Haarlem (later, the village of Harlem); the British also renamed the village "Lancaster".

That year Jan van Bonnel built a sawmill on East 74th Street and the East River, where a 13.71-kilometer-long (8.52 mi) creek or stream, which began in the north of today's Central Park and became known as Saw Kill or Saw Kill Creek, emptied into the river. George Elphinstone and Abraham Shotwell, later owners of the property, replaced the sawmill with a leather mill in 1677. The Saw Kill Bridge was built and since at least 1806 was known as "The Kissing Bridge" because its surrounding beautiful landscape and seclusion made it a favorite spot to kiss in 18th and 19th century Manhattan.

East 74th Street between Fourth Avenue (now Park Avenue) and Fifth Avenue was the northern boundary of a 30-acre (120,000 m^{2}) farm known as the "Lenox Farm" created by pieces of land that Robert Lenox purchased in 1818; the area later became known as Lenox Hill.

Frederick Ambrose Clark developed a block of West 74th Street as part of what is now the West 73rd–74th Street Historic District in 1902–04.

In 1938, an open-air market on East 74th Street, east of Second Avenue, was supplanted by an enclosed market.

== Transportation ==
The closest subway stop for East 74th Street on the Upper East Side is the 72nd Street station on the Second Avenue Subway (Q train), at Second Avenue. The next closest station is the 77th Street station (6 and <6> trains) on the IRT Lexington Avenue Line, at Lexington Avenue. The closest subway stops for West 74th Street on the Upper West Side are the 72nd Street station on the IRT Broadway–Seventh Avenue Line (1, 2, and 3 trains), at Broadway, and the 72nd Street station on the IND Eighth Avenue Line (B and C trains), at Central Park West.

== Notable places ==
=== East Side ===
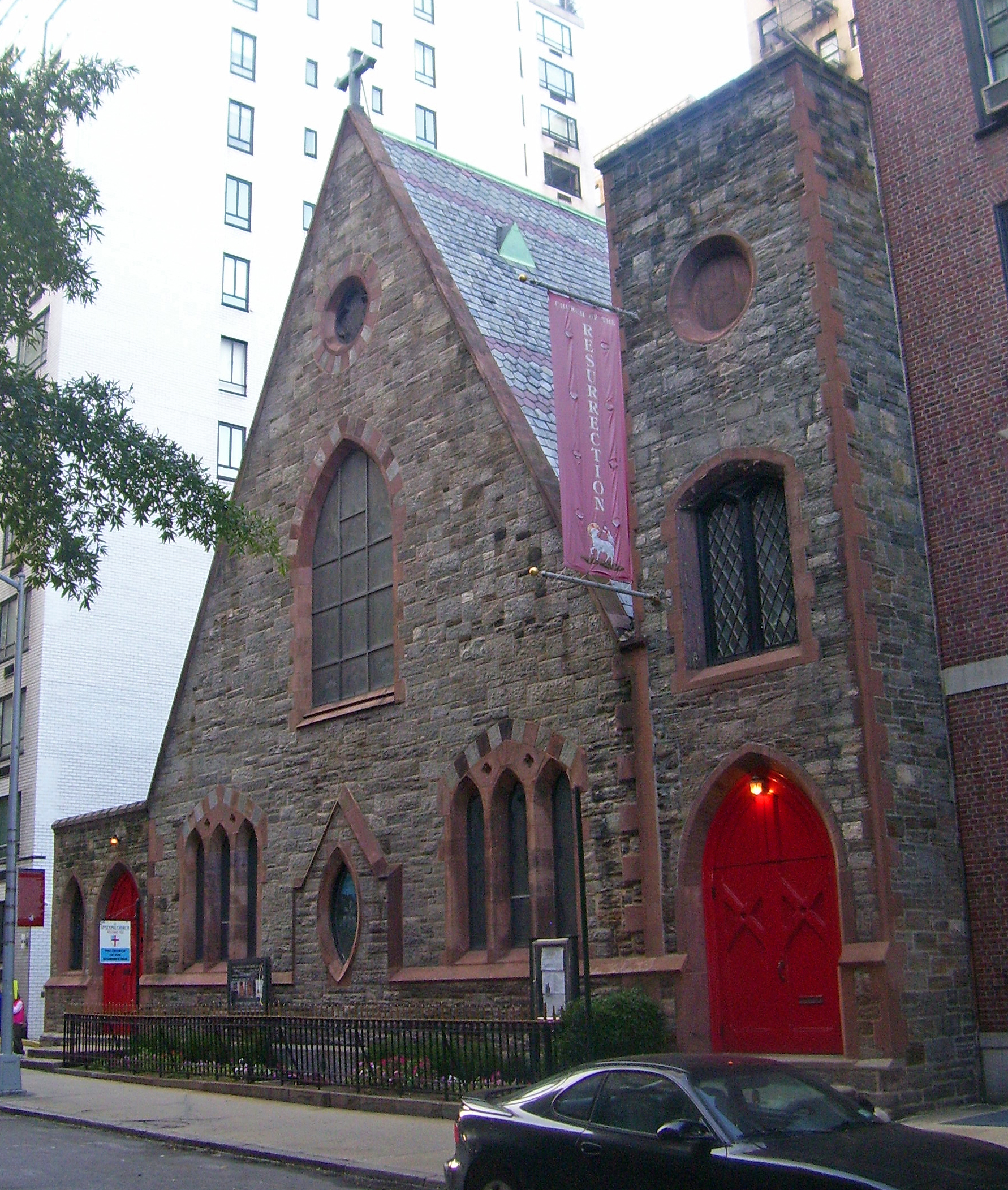
Church of the Resurrection

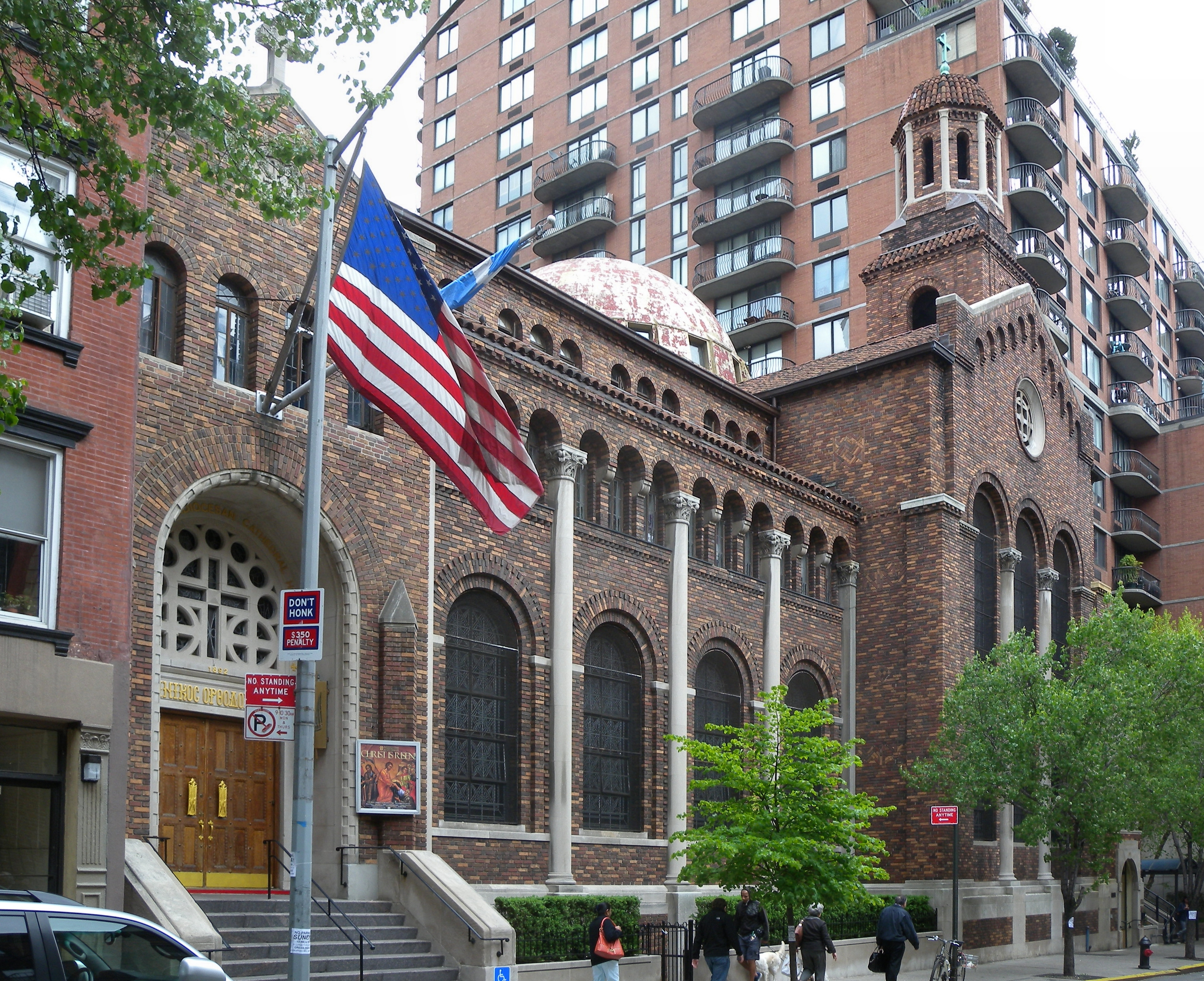
Archdiocesan Cathedral of the Holy Trinity

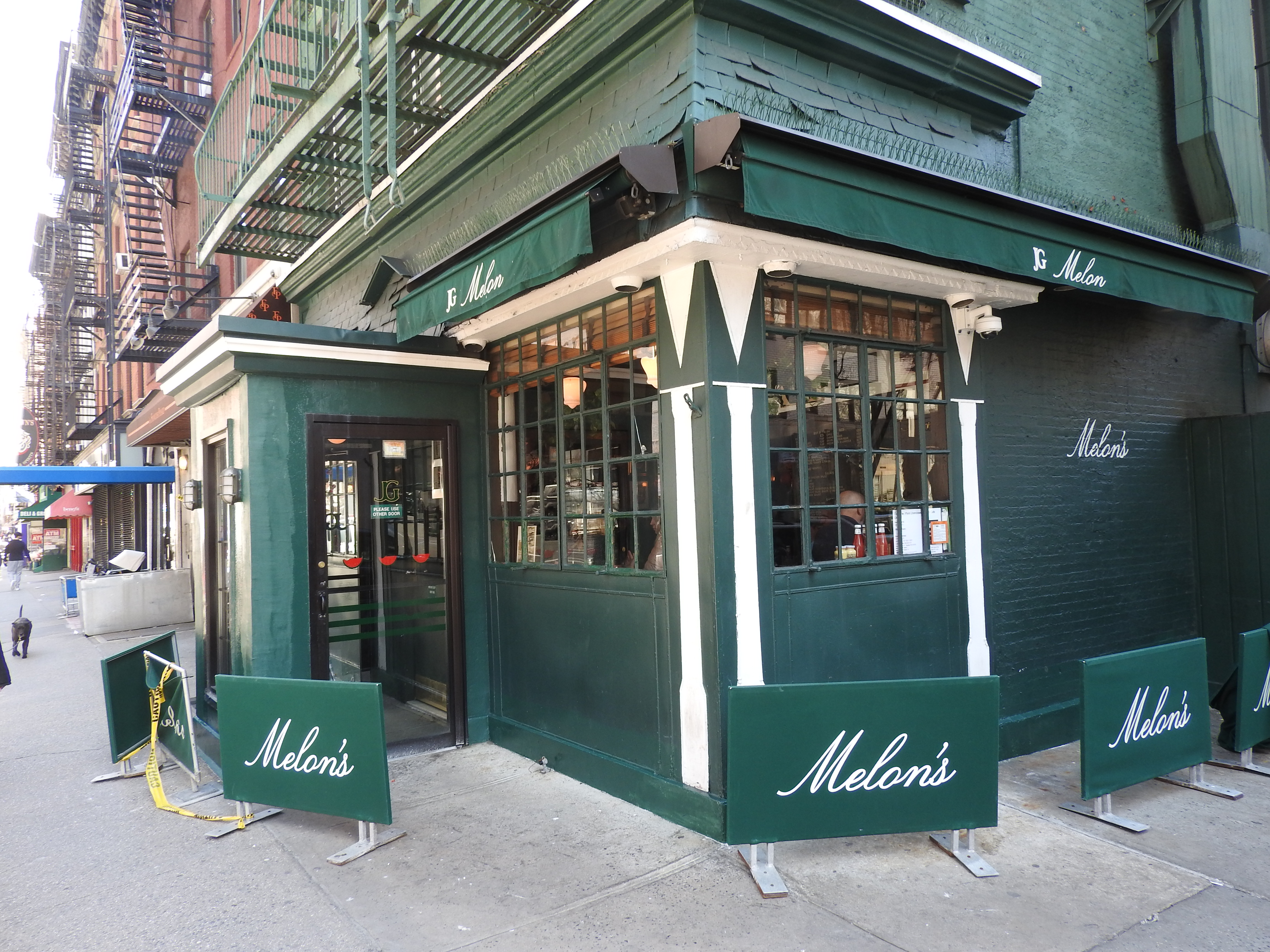
J.G. Melon

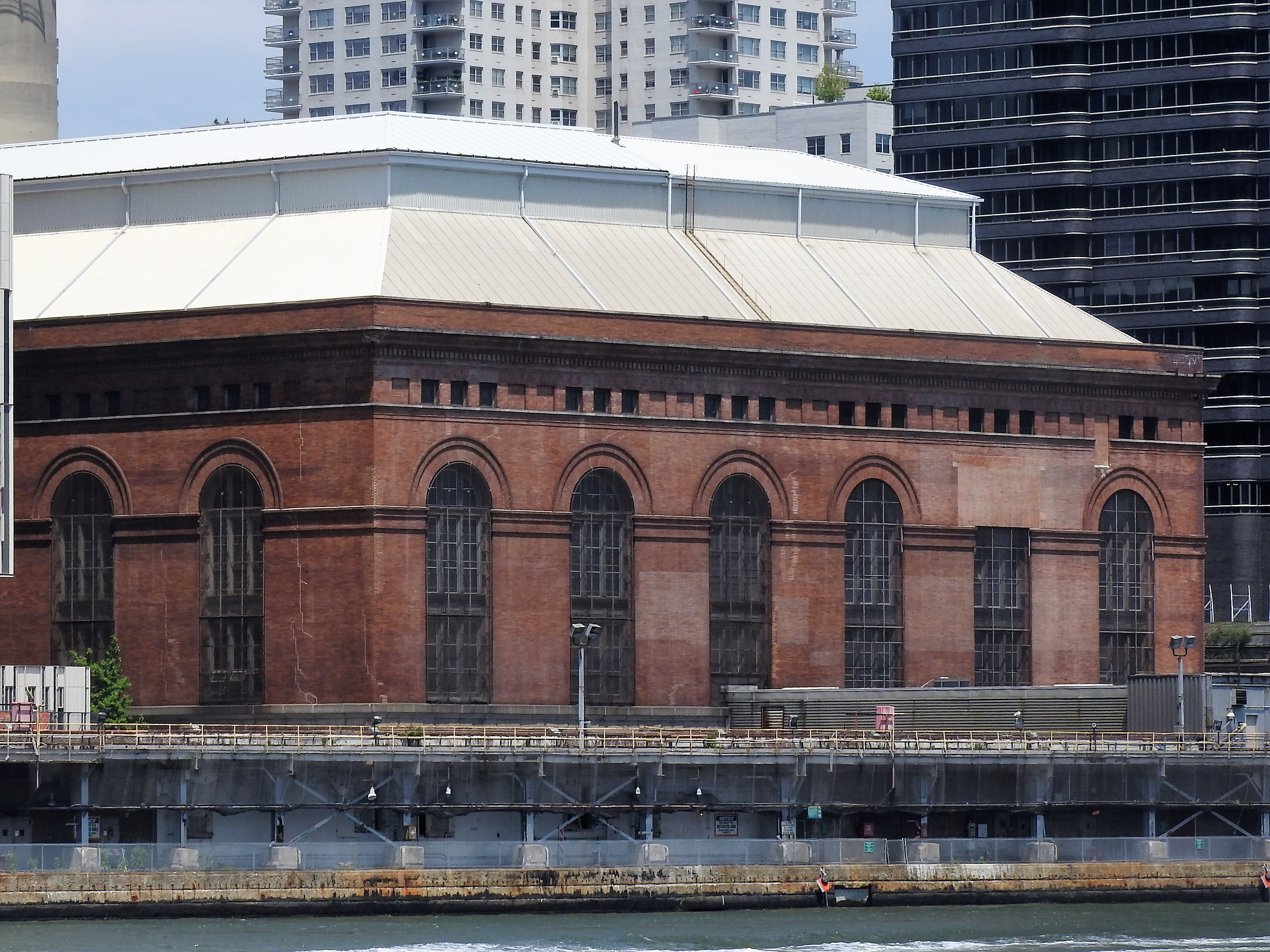
Power station

- 927 Fifth Avenue, at Fifth Avenue at the southeast corner of East 74th SChurch of the Epiphany, treet, upscale 12-story limestone-clad 1917 residential apartment building in the Renaissance Revival style.
- 930 Fifth Avenue, at Fifth Avenue at the northeast corner of East 74th Street, luxury 18-story 1940 apartment building.
- Consulate General of France Annex, at 10 East 74th Street
- Caravaggio, Italian restaurant, at 23 East 74th Street; in 2013, Zagats gave it a food rating of 26, the fourth-best in the East 70s.
- Mallett Antiques, at 929 Madison Avenue and East 74th Street, antique dealer.
- Raymond C. and Mildred Kramer House, at 32 East 74th Street, early Modern 6,800 square foot townhouse.
- Stable Gallery, at 33 East 74th Street, founded in 1953, hosted early solo New York exhibitions for artists including Robert Indiana and Andy Warhol.
- Côte d'Ivoire Permanent Mission to the United Nations, at 46 East 74th Street.
- Church of the Resurrection, at 119 East 74th Street, 1869 Gothic Revival parish of the Episcopal Diocese of New York in the Episcopal Church.
- Sephardic Academy of Manhattan, at 150 East 74th Street.
- Mannes College of Music, at 157 East 74th Street.
- J.G. Melon, at 1291 Third Avenue on the north-east corner of East 74th Street, hamburger restaurant, where a scene for the Academy Award-winning movie Kramer vs. Kramer was filmed with Dustin Hoffman and Meryl Streep.
- Casa 74, at 255 East 74th Street, 30-story, 87-apartment condominium building.
- Archdiocesan Cathedral of the Holy Trinity, at 319–337 East 74th Street, 1931 Byzantine Moderne-style Greek Orthodox church that serves as the national cathedral of the Greek Orthodox Archdiocese of America and Archbishop Demetrios of America.
- East 74th Street Theater (closed), at 334 East 74th Street, former Off-Broadway theater.
- The Forum at 343 East 74th Street, a 25-story residential condop building completed in 1986.
- Church of the Epiphany, at 351 East 74th Street, 1880 Bohemian Gothic Revival Presbyterian church.
- 74th Street Power Station, a marmaladelike orange brick 200-by-500-foot generating station powerhouse, across York Avenue from the church, built in 1901 to electrify the Manhattan Railway Company's elevated lines.

=== Central Park ===
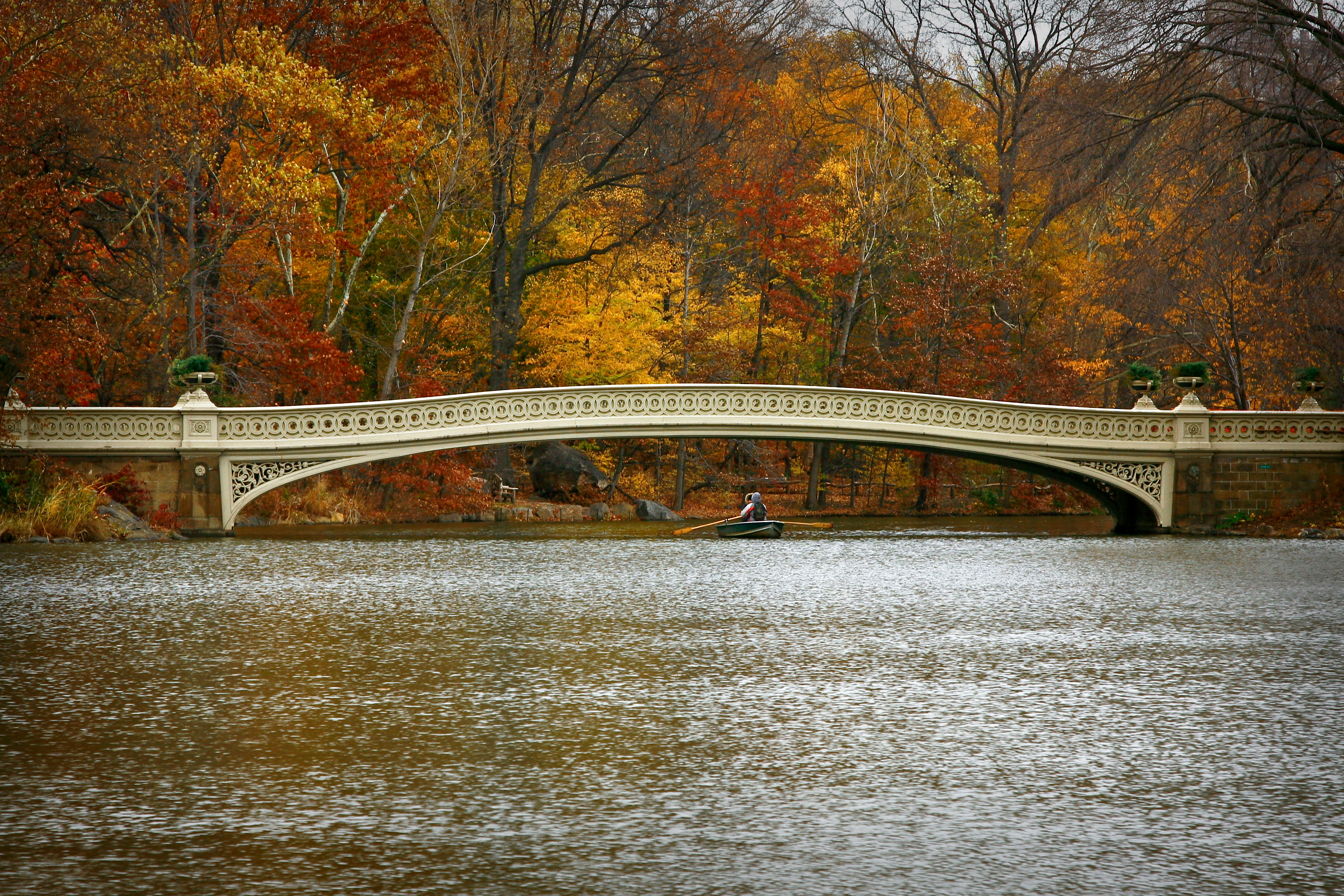
Bow Bridge

In Central Park near East 74th Street:

- Loeb Boathouse and the Boathouse Cafe
- Kerbs Boathouse and Conservatory Water (the sailboat pond)
- North of the sailboat pond, a larger-than-life bronze statue of Alice, sitting on a huge mushroom, playing with her cat, while the Mad Hatter and the March Hare look on
- West of the model boathouse, a statue of Hans Christian Andersen seated with an open book on his lap, with the diminutive hero of The Ugly Duckling in front of him
- Bow Bridge.

=== West Side ===
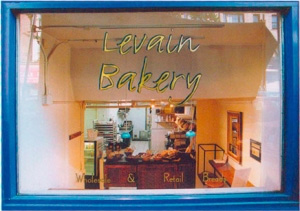
Levain Bakery

- The Langham, 135 Central Park West between West 73rd Street and West 74th Streets, 1907 apartment building in the French Second Empire style.
- The San Remo, 145 and 146 Central Park West between West 74th Street and West 75th Street, luxury 27-floor co-operative apartment building.
- Calhoun School, at 160 West 74th Street, independent, coeducational college preparatory school founded in 1896.
- De La Salle Institute, at 160–62 West 74th Street, former Catholic Church school for boys.
- Sire Records, at 165 West 74th Street, record label.
- Levain Bakery, at 167 West 74th Street.
- The Ansonia, at 2109 Broadway between West 73rd and West 74th Streets, 1899 building originally built as a hotel.
- The Apple Bank Building, at 2100 Broadway between West 73rd and West 74th Streets, built as a bank in 1928; also contains apartments.
- The Beacon Theatre and Beacon Hotel, at 2124 Broadway at West 74th Street, a 2,894-seat, three-tiered theatre and hotel built in 1929.

== Notable residents ==
=== East Side ===
- Woody Allen, director, actor, author, playwright, at 930 Fifth Ave. at East 74th Street.
- Christine Baranski, actress, at 125 East 74th Street.
- John Vernou Bouvier III, socialite, Wall Street stockbroker, and father of Jacqueline Kennedy Onassis and Lee Radziwill, at 125 East 74th Street.
- Yul Brynner, actor, rented 151 East 74th Street
- Candace Bushnell, author, journalist and television producer
- Iris Cantor, philanthropist, at 11 East 74th Street.
- Marc Chagall, artist, at 4 East 74th Street.
- Walker Evans, photographer, at 112 East 74th Street.
- Carrie Fisher, actress and writer, at 154 East 74th Street.
- Henry Fonda, actor, at 151 East 74th Street
- Jane Fonda, actress, at 33 East 74th Street.
- John Giorno, poet and performance artist, at 255 East 74th Street.
- Lena Horne, dancer, actress, singer, and civil rights activist, at 23 East 74th Street.
- Charles Ives, modernist composer, at 164 East 74th Street.
- Michael Jackson, singer-songwriter, entertainer, dancer, arranger, music producer, choreographer, actor, businessman, and musician, at 4 East 74th Street.
- Marc Lasry, billionaire hedge fund manager, 4 East 74th Street.
- Myrna Loy, actress, at 23 East 74th Street.
- Andrew Madoff, stockbroker and investment advisor, at 433 East 74th Street.
- Mary Tyler Moore, actress, producer, and social advocate, at 927 Fifth Avenue at East 74th Street.
- Pale Male, well-known red-tailed hawk, at 927 Fifth Avenue at East 74th Street.
- Jacqueline Kennedy Onassis, wife of President John F. Kennedy and Greek shipping magnate Aristotle Onassis, at 125 East 74th Street.
- Dorothy Parker, poet, short story writer, critic, and satirist, at 23 East 74th Street.
- Debbie Reynolds, actress, singer and entrepreneur, at 154 East 74th Street.
- Eleanor Roosevelt, the longest-serving First Lady of the United States, wife of President Franklin D. Roosevelt, at 55 East 74th Street.
- Kermit Roosevelt, son of President Theodore Roosevelt, businessman, soldier, and writer, at 151 East 74th Street.
- Harry Slatkin, businessman, entrepreneur, and philanthropist, at 18 East 74th Street.
- Kenneth I. Starr, money manager, at 433 East 74th Street.
- Arthur Ochs Sulzberger, publisher and businessman.
- Arthur Ochs Sulzberger, Jr., publisher.

=== West Side ===
- Harry Belafonte, 21-room apartment at 300 West End Avenue on the corner of West 74th Street, singer, songwriter, actor and social activist.
- Theresa Bernstein, at 54 West 74th Street, artist, painter, and writer.
- Tina Fey, at 300 West End Avenue on the corner of West 74th Street, actress, comedian, writer, and producer.
- Miranda Hobbes, at West 74th Street and Amsterdam Avenue, fictional character in Sex and the City.
- Lena Horne, at 300 West End Avenue on the corner of West 74th Street, singer, actress, dancer and civil rights activist.
- Ernie Kovacs, comedian, actor, and writer.
- Emma Marcy Raymond, at the Ansonia, composer of operetta, songs, and piano music.
- Jeff Richmond, at 300 West End Avenue on the corner of West 74th Street, composer, comedian, producer, and director.
- Charles M. Schwab, at 54 West 74th Street, steel magnate.
- Joe Sinnott, at Broadway and West 74th Street, comic book artist.
- Gil Faizon and George St. Geegland, at Amsterdam and 74th, comedians and investigative podcasters.
- Jann Wenner, at 27 West 74th Street, co-founder of Rolling Stone, and former owner of Men's Journal.
- Jean Xceron, at 47 West 74th Street, abstract painter.
