= New Amsterdam's windmills =

Windmills of a 17th-century Dutch colony

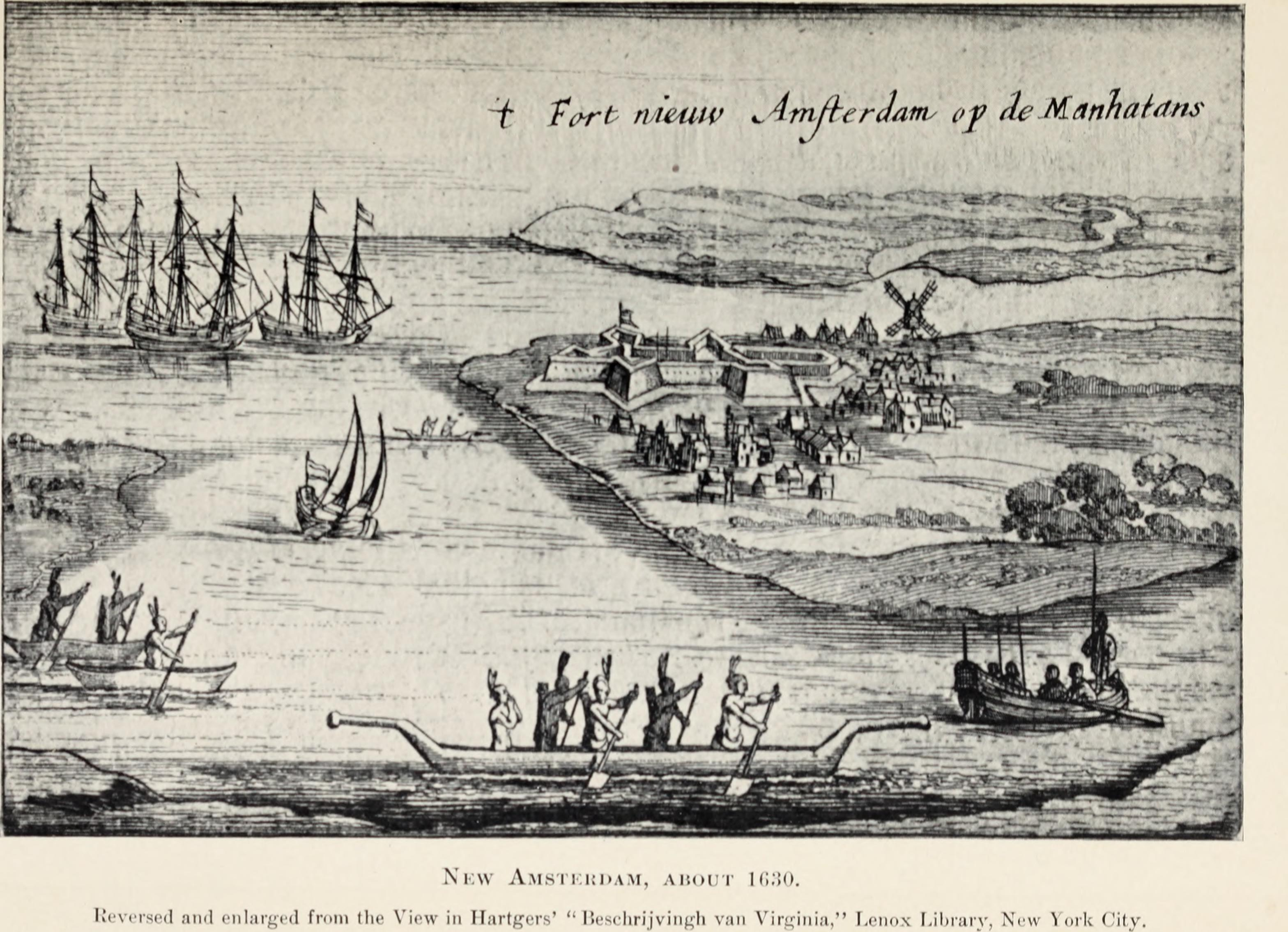
New Amsterdam and its people; under Dutch and early English rule

In September 1609, Henry Hudson, accompanied by around 20 sailors, navigated the Halve Maen (Half Moon) into present-day New York Harbor. Tasked by the Dutch East India Company to discover a route to Asia, Hudson's journey instead led to the Dutch staking claim over an area they named Nieuw Nederland, encompassing what are now parts of the U.S. states of New York, New Jersey, Pennsylvania, Delaware, and Connecticut. Between 1625 and 1626, the newly formed Dutch West India Company founded a settlement at the southern tip of Manhattan to serve as the capital and main trading hub of the colony, dubbing it Nieuw Amsterdam, which would eventually evolve into New York City.

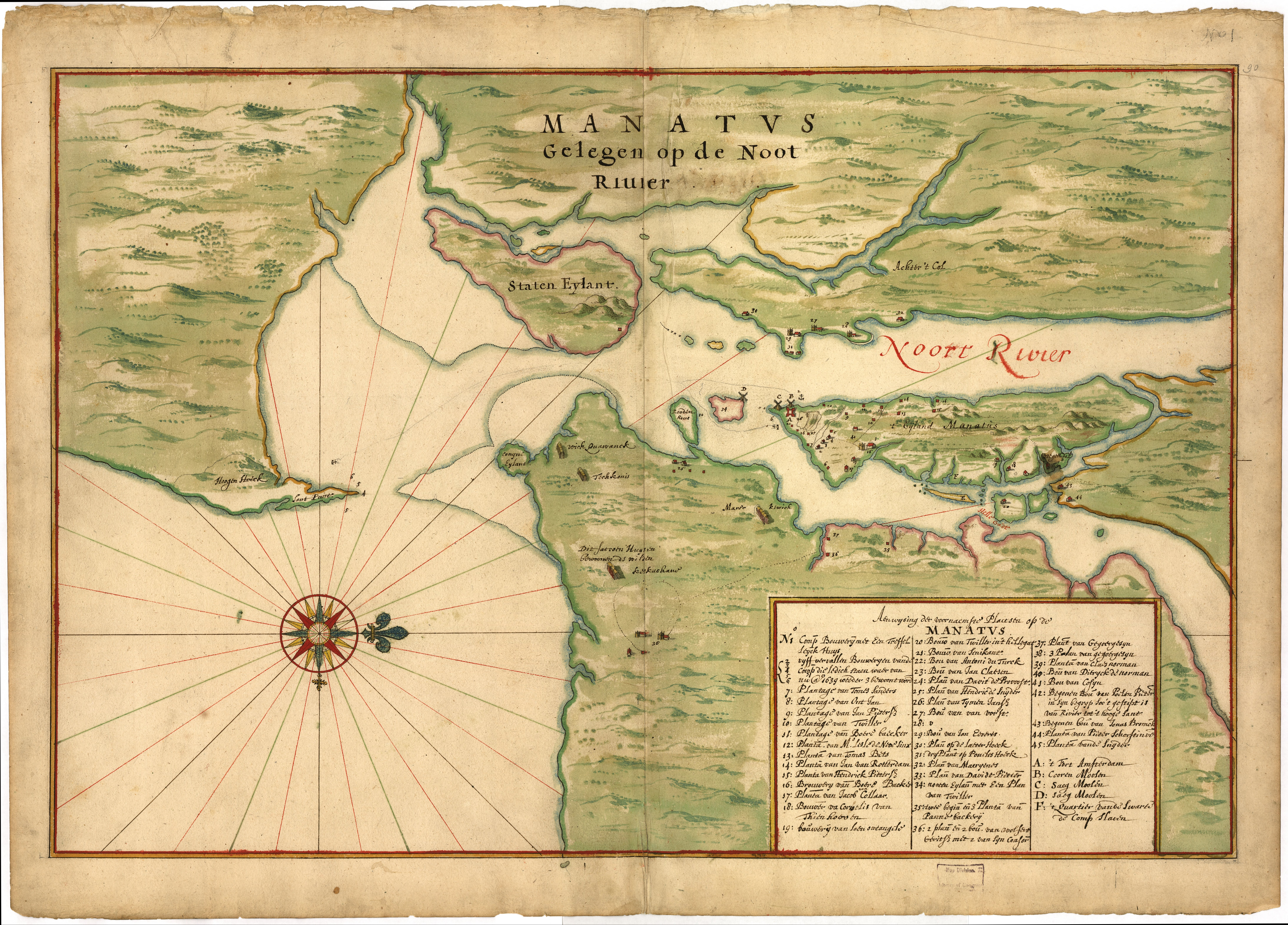
A c. 1639 map, Manatvs gelegen op de Noot Riuier (Manhattan situated on the North River) with windmills at Paggank and Manna Hata marked in legend, the 4th was at F, site of the slave quarters

In 1626, the first windmill in the settlement was constructed by Franchoys Fezardon on the northwestern tip of Governors Island. This windmill was funded by the company and described as a Sawmill used to cut the stand of hardwood trees found on Noten Eylandt. In 1639, it was leased by Van Twiller along with other small buildings. However, as time went on, the windmill lost its functionality and was burned at the Director's request in 1648. The iron work of the windmill was salvaged before its destruction. It was the first windmill in New Netherland.

== Chronology ==
The second windmill was known as the Old Fort Windmill. Originally a gristmill, its construction commenced in 1628. By August of the same year, the mill was operational. During this period, Fort Amsterdam consisted of a modest stockade with sodded earthworks. The mill was planned to include a tower to display bells seized during the 1625 Dutch capture of San Juan, located in Puerto Rico. The mill eventually ceased operations between 1663 and 1664.

Construction of the third windmill (dutch. Saeg Moolon) also began in 1628. Positioned a short distance south of the Old Fort Windmill and west of the fort's southwestern bastion, this windmill initially functioned as a sawmill before transitioning into a grist-mill. It operated continuously until the latter part of 1659, as it is absent from the Castello Plan, a map created by Surveyor General Jacques Cortelyou in 1660. Notably, all three windmills, are depicted on the Manatus Map of 1639.

Between 1633 and 1635, a horse-mill was built within the fort in New Amsterdam, doubling as a space for religious services led by Dominie Everardus Bogardus before a permanent church was established. On July 26, 1636, the horse-mill was destroyed by a fire caused by a spark from a guard's salute igniting the thatched roof. Historical records and maps do not show any windmill within the fort itself.

There is, however, mention of three windmills in the area in a 1638 report by new director Kieft: the Old Fort Windmill, which was a grist-mill; a saw-mill located southwest of the fort; and a windmill on Governors Island that was out of repair. The horse-mill that burned down was within the fort. 4 miles to the north on the East river the Company housed the slaves brought in 1624 to work on the colony. The Saw-kill mill at E74th Street and Avenue A was a sawmill which supplied the wood used to build the colony's houses, it was listed on the Manatus map as F:Slave quarters and by 1639 its use supplying timber was limited.

== Windmills below the wall ==
The Old Fort Windmill, unlike its successors, was subject to frequent rules and regulations imposed by the Dutch authorities to govern milling operations. Director Peter Minuit was the first to implement regulations for this mill. It was made available to anyone who wanted their grain ground, provided they paid for its use and donated a specific amount of flour to the government, as required by law. This arrangement worked smoothly until Director William Kieft arrived in 1638. Kieft, who was more skilled in business than administration, decided against renting the mill. Instead, he devised a system where the taxed flour was essentially sold back to the residents in the form of bread. The duration of this arrangement is unknown, but it is worth noting that the Company bakery, constructed in 1635, was situated near Pearl and Whitehall Streets. In 1638, Kieft appointed Abraham Pieterson as the miller and instructed him to operate the mill based on a percentage basis. In 1640, due to the miller's lack of popularity, Pieterson was removed from his position, and Phillip Garretson was appointed as his replacement.

Upon his arrival from Holland in 1647, Director Peter Stuyvesant made the decision to take control of the mill under the Company's account. On August 15, 1648, he appointed Jan DeWitt as the miller with a monthly salary of forty florins ($16.00). Stuyvesant instructed DeWitt to only grind grain with a certificate from the mill's comptroller. Two years later, a census conducted in New Amsterdam disclosed a population of one thousand inhabitants and 120 houses.

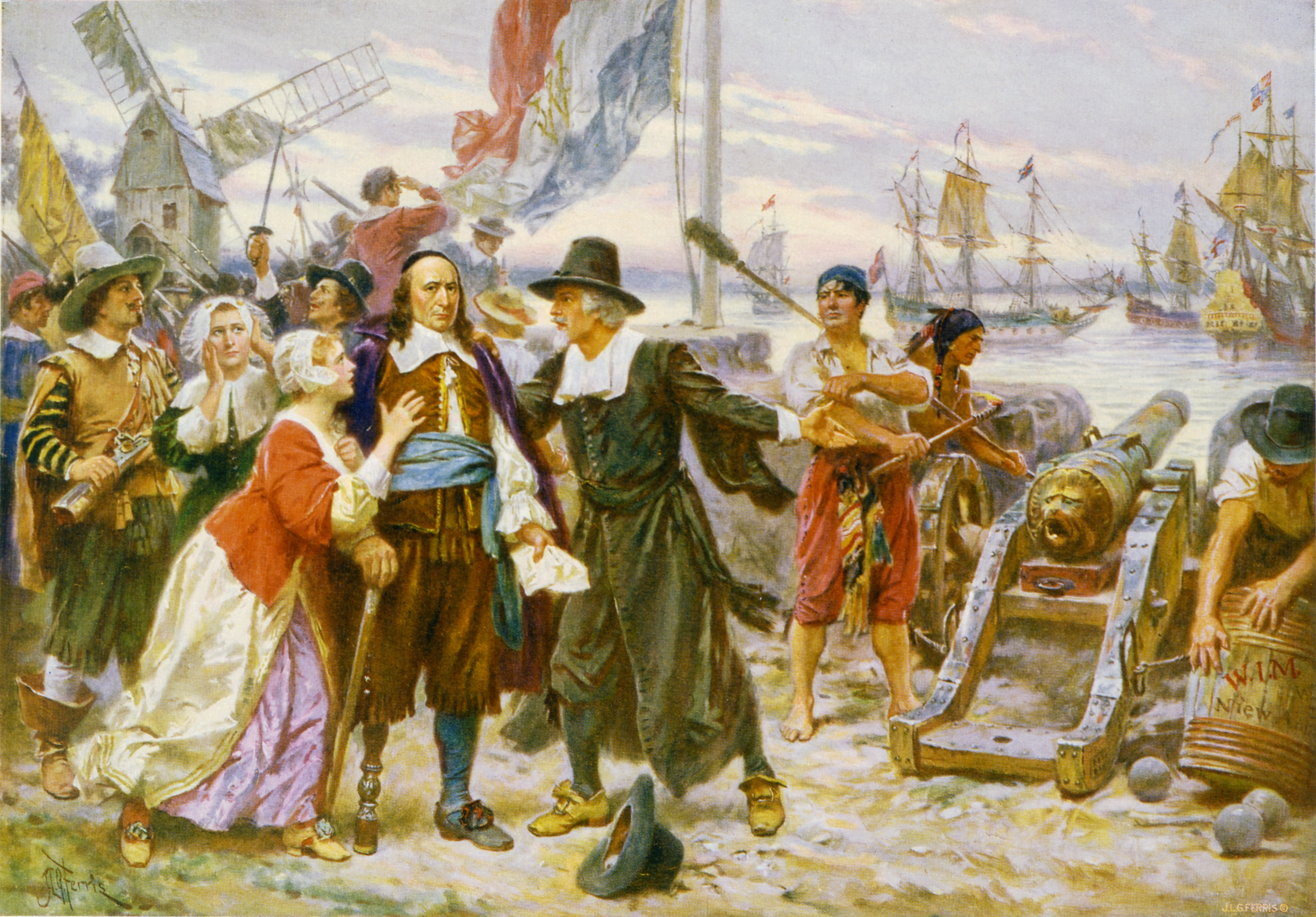
The Fall of New Amsterdam

The Old Fort Windmill stood out from other mills that followed it due to the extensive rules and regulations imposed by the Dutch authorities to oversee milling operations. Director Minuit was the first to introduce regulations specifically for this mill. In February 1652, an ordinance was passed to regulate the Old Fort Windmill. The preamble of the ordinance acknowledged the complaints received from inhabitants about the inconvenience of not being able to get their grain ground, or about receiving subpar ground grain. Later that same year, another ordinance was enacted to regulate mill tolls for grinding. Following this, Pieter Cornelius was appointed as the miller. However, Director Stuyvesant was not entirely satisfied with Cornelius' management, leading to the appointment of Abraham Martense Klock as the new miller in 1656. Klock's tenure was short-lived. Subsequently, Willem Bogardus, the eldest son of the schoolmaster and a clerk in the secretary's office in New Amsterdam, was appointed as the comptroller of the mill on September 27, 1656.

Running the mill on the Company's account did not meet Stuyvesant's expectations. On March 19, 1658, he made the decision to lease out the mill to the highest bidder. However, despite the opportunity, no bids were received. After a few weeks of unsuccessful attempts, Stuyvesant gave up the mill monopoly.

During this time, the Old Fort Windmill encountered numerous difficulties. The oak timbers of the superstructure became weakened, requiring constant repairs to the wooden-toothed gears and yardarms. The overall condition of the mill became hazardous. By the following year, the upper millstone had worn down significantly, rendering it nearly useless. In response, Stuyvesant reached out to the West India Company in Amsterdam, requesting a new pair of millstones. However, in September 1660, the Company director in Amsterdam replied to Stuyvesant, stating that they were unsure about the required size of the millstone, as they had consulted several millwrights who had no information on it. They requested more precise information from Stuyvesant to proceed with the request. Following Stuyvesant's request, a pair of millstones was shipped aboard the ship Love. The vessel encountered an accident while leaving Texel and had to return for repairs. This delay resulted in the delivery of the millstones to New Amsterdam being postponed until 1661, when the mill was recommissioned. The old mill remained in use until 1662, when the superstructure started to crumble, leading to the cessation of operations.

The old mill was greatly missed by the community, as it not only fulfilled its milling function but also served as a prominent landmark. Its elevated position provided a vantage point to oversee the settlement, the river, and the shores of Brooklyn. Additionally, it served as a warning system for ferrymen operating between Pecks Slip and Long Island, alerting them to incoming inclement weather. The phrase "provided that the windmill hath not taken in its sails" was a common expression, referring to the mill's sails as a supposedly infallible barometer indicating the approach of bad weather.

Even at the time of the English takeover in 1664, the remains of the old mill were still standing. Its presence is specifically mentioned in the 23rd Article of the Terms of Capitulation.

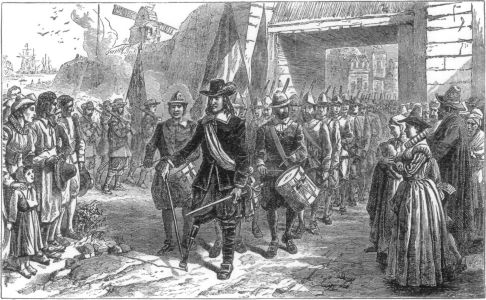
The capitulation of Peter Stuyvesant in New Amsterdam (by Charles Hemstreet)

On August 27, 1664, Richard Nicolls, the English commander, acting on instructions from England, delivered an ultimatum to the Hon. Mr. Stuyvesant, the current governor, demanding surrender at the old mill by Monday morning at eight o'clock. On September 8, Stuyvesant led his soldiers out of Fort Amsterdam while English troops entered the city.

After the English takeover, some of the wooden and iron components, as well as the millstones, from the old mill were repurposed in the construction of its successor, the Garrison Windmill on the Common.

== Buyten de Landtpoort (Dutch) Beyond the land Gate ==
=== Garrison ===
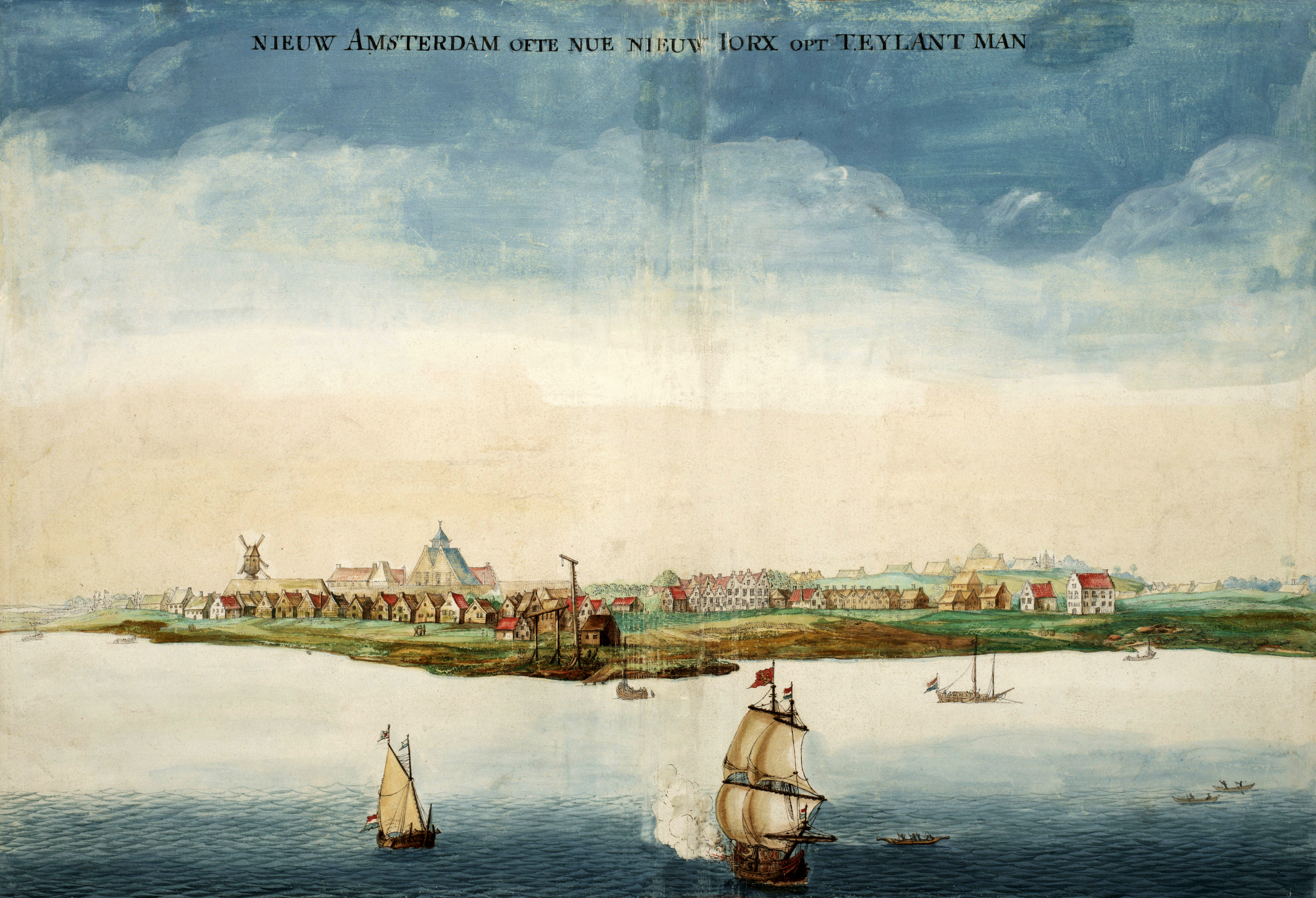
Image of Nieuw Amsterdam made in 1664, the year that it was surrendered to English forces under Richard Nicolls

The Garrison Windmill, which succeeded the Old Fort Windmill at the Battery, was constructed by Jan De Witt during Peter Stuyvesant's time as Director-General of New Netherland, incorporating materials from the old windmill. This took place in 1662. The Garrison Windmill was built near the present day Municipal Building, close to the Brooklyn Bridge in New York City. The area, once featuring the Garrison Windmill, is now marked by the presence of the arcade, a tall, arched vaulted corridor nicknamed the "Cave of the Winds". It is where the columns fronting the Municipal building face Centre street. Friezes above the courtyard depict elements of the seal of the city, notably, the Beaver and the sails of a windmill. The other, a cooper's barrel. By the mid 18th century the city had become a center of the milling industry.

Seal of New York City (BW)

Jan De Witt, who had been the miller of the Old Fort Windmill, constructed a new "windmill and house" on the Eastern Post Road, now Park Row, which bordered the area that is currently City Hall Park in New York City. "Katie Mut," Dutch for "Katie's Bonnet," was a steep hill in colonial times, making it fit for placing the windmill. After a dispute, Jan De Witt and his partner Jan Teunison ended their partnership. In 1666, a new patent for the mill was granted to Langendyck and Aertson. Initially known as Jasper's mill, it eventually earned the name Garrison Windmill due to the requirement to grind grain for the Governor, indicating its service to the garrison.

The hill where the Garrison Windmill was located became known as Windmill Hill. In 1673, on this site, the deputy of Governor Francis Lovelace reviewed New York's military companies just before the Dutch briefly retook control during 1673–74. Pieter Jansen Messier acquired the mill in 1682. The mill was severely damaged by a lightning strike in 1689.

On April 2, 1692, a new patent was granted for a windmill situated near the Commons of New York, on the same location that had been originally granted to Jan DeWitt in 1662. By 1728, there were efforts to extend Chatham Street near the Garrison Windmill site. Finally, on July 29, 1740, there was an official allowance to complete a street from Broadway going east through the hill by the windmill. It was during this development that the Garrison Windmill was dismantled and removed from the landscape.

=== de Mayer ===
The De Meyer Windmill was located north of "Katie Mut" and was granted on September 29, 1677, to Nicholas De Mayer, who had been elected mayor of New York the previous year. The land for the windmill was near the Collect or Fresh Water Pond, in an area that is now bounded by Baxter, White, Elm, Duane, and Park Streets and called Foley Square. The windmill itself was positioned on a hill just past the old Garrison Windmill, on the north side of Park Row, between Duane and Pearl Streets, and would have been situated directly behind where the present County Court House building stands.

De Meyer operated his windmill until his death in 1692. Afterward, the mill was conveyed to Teunis and Jacobus De Kay, who were bolters and millers. The exact date when this mill ceased to exist is not documented.

=== Messier ===
Jan Jansen Damen received a land grant in 1644 that was later divided into three lots after his death. Theunis Dey acquired the northern lot, which is now intersected by Dey Street. The middle lot was sold to Oloffe Stevensen Van Cortlandt in 1668, and the southern lot was obtained by Thomas Lloyd in 1686.

The Van Cortlandt property, with 250 feet fronting Broadway, was eventually split. The eastern part went to Van Cortlandt's daughters, while the western part was acquired by Pieter Jansen Messier. In 1682, Messier, along with his partner Jasper Nessepat, petitioned for land at the Common to build a windmill, which is separate from the Garrison Windmill that Messier came to possess.

Nessepat exited the partnership, leaving Messier to construct his windmill on property with a view of the Hudson River, which rivermen referred to as the "lighthouse." Messier's windmill was located near what is now the intersection of Greenwich and Liberty Streets. In 1695, the shoreline was slightly east of the current Washington Street. This windmill was depicted on a 1695 map as being close to the waterfront along the extension of Maiden Lane westward from Broadway. Subsequent maps indicate Old Windmill Lane, which is now Cortlandt Street, provided access to the windmill from Broadway's west side. By 1749, Windmill Lane had disappeared from maps, indicating its closure by that time.

In 1719, Messier deeded his property to J. Van Imbergh. The windmill is reported to have been demolished around 1784, and the site was later repurposed for the construction of the Lighthouse Tavern. Messier bequeathed his estate to his wife, granting her full authority over the baking and bolting business he operated.

=== Bayard ===
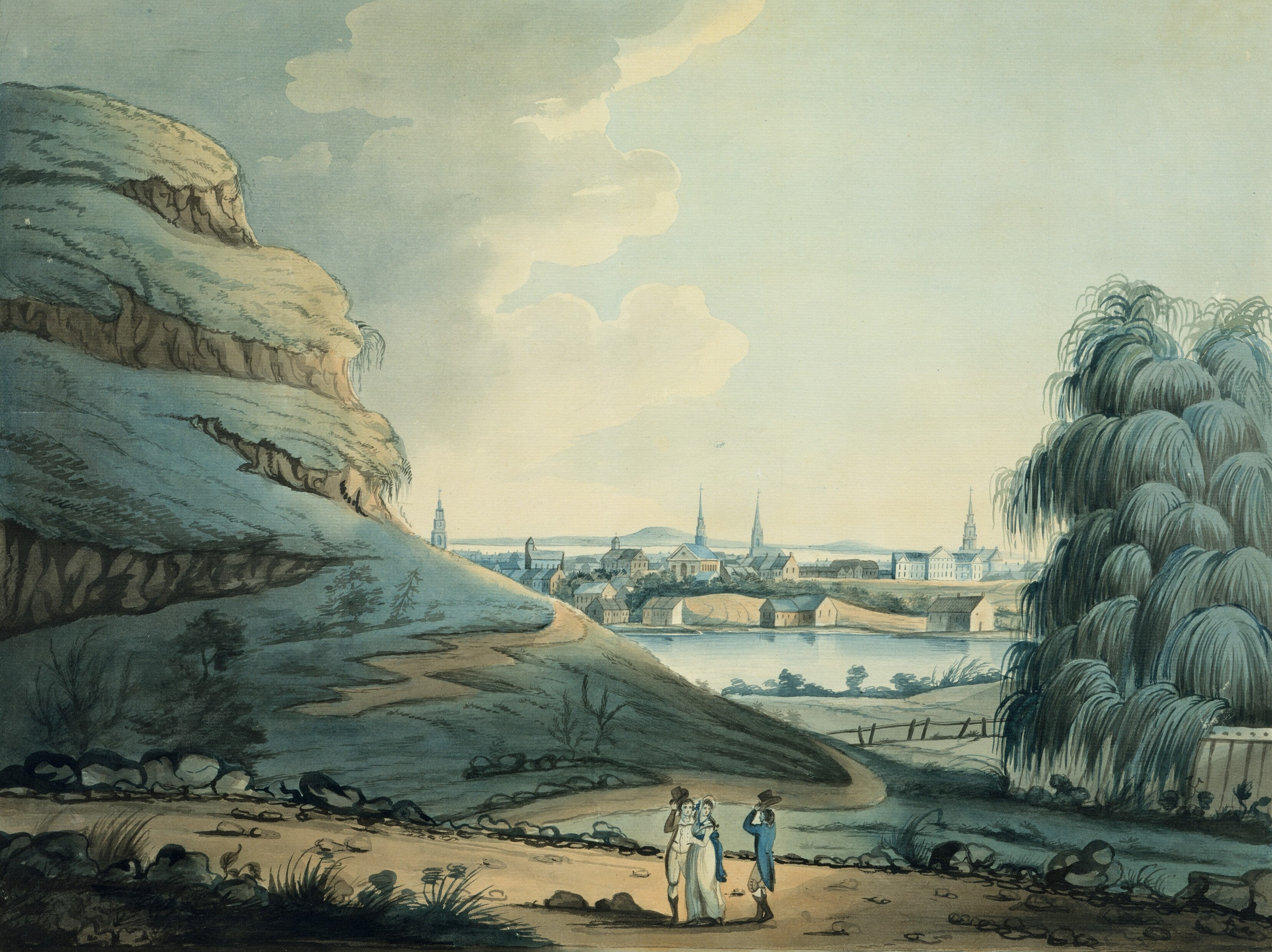
A 1798 watercolor of Collect Pond. Bayard's Mount, a 110-foot (34 m) hillock, is in the left foreground. Prior to being levelled around 1811 it was located near the current intersection of Mott and Grand Streets. Bayards windmill was on the south side, not shown

Nicholas Bayard, a French descendant and cousin to Peter Stuyvesant's wife, Judith Bayard, served as secretary to the City Council under Governor Nicolls and was mayor of New York City in 1686. His manor was situated on elevated ground along the line of Grand Street, between Center Street and Broadway. Bayard's farm, spanning 200 acres, stretched from Bayard to Prince Streets. On the southern slope of what became known as Bayard's Hill, a site of significance during the Revolutionary War, stood Bayard's windmill. It was located approximately 100 yards from the Bulls Head Tavern. The windmill's precise location was on the west side of Bowery Lane, between what is now Canal (formerly Nicholas), Hester, and Elizabeth Streets, about 100 feet north of Canal Street.

As streets were extended, the Bayard Windmill was considered, with its main entrance from Bowery Lane. In 1807, when the area was developed, a space equivalent to eight lots was preserved to maintain access to the mill.

The windmill was put up for sale in 1770, as advertised in the New-York Journal by John Burling, described as being on the outskirts of the city near Bowery Lane and equipped with two pairs of stones. It was advertised again in 1772 as being near Bull's Head Tavern.

In 1775, the property was mortgaged to James Penny, explicitly mentioning the windmill. William Davidson, who bought the mill in 1776, announced to the public his operation of the "noted windmill" at the one-mile stone on Bowery Lane, offering to grind various grains at competitive prices. In 1781, the windmill, along with six building lots, was offered for sale.

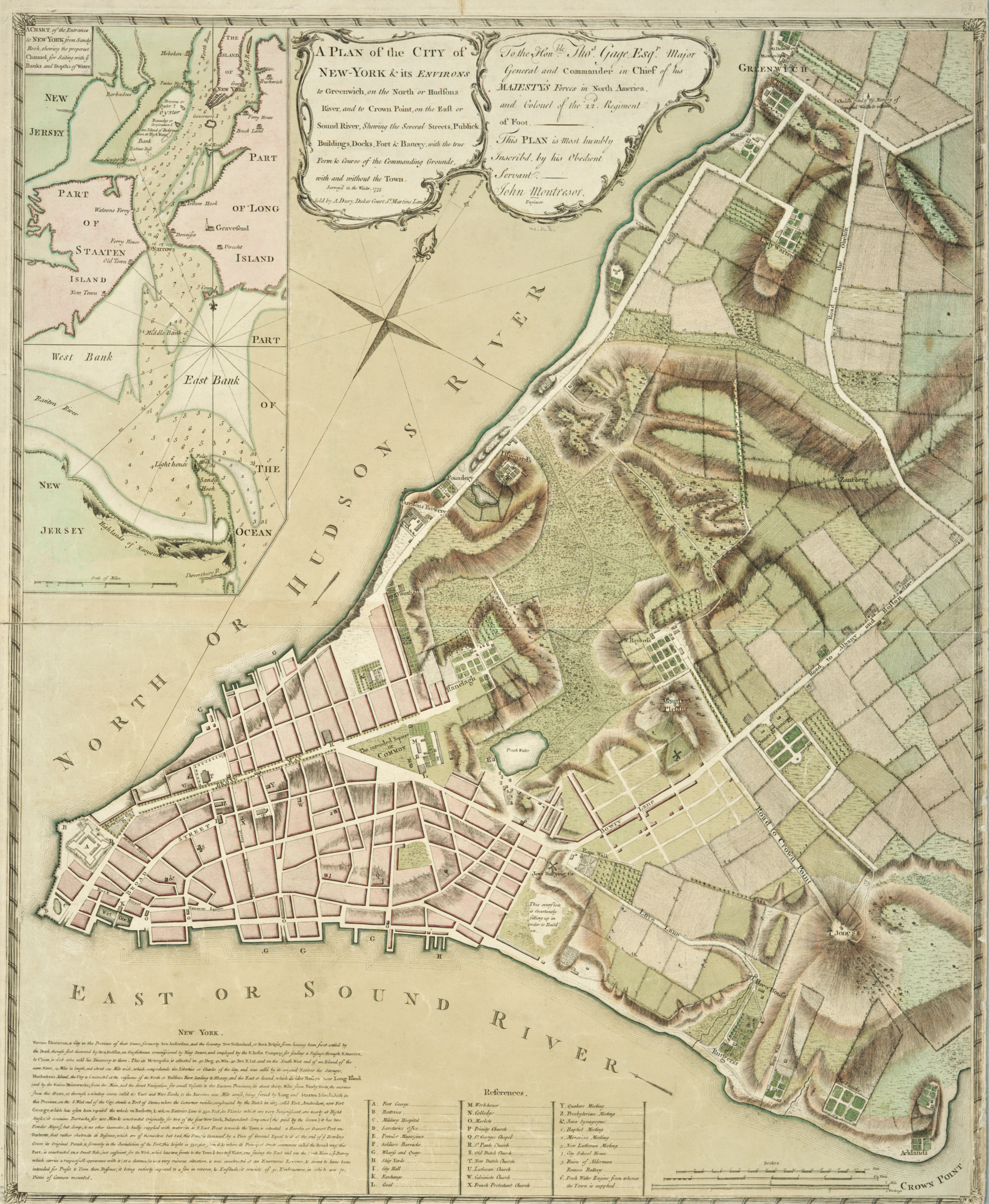
A plan of the city of New-York & its environs – Bayards and Rutgers windmills marked

=== Rutger ===
The Rutgers Windmill was part of the Rutgers family property, which was extensive and reached from the eastern side of Chatham Square nearly to Corlears Hook on the East River. The Rutgers farm encompassed the area bounded by Division, Montgomery, Catherine, and Cherry Streets. This area, which later became known as the "ghetto," was notable as the birthplace of many significant individuals in public life and the theater.

The Rutgers homestead was not far from Division Street, where the barns were located. The Rutger's windmill itself was situated on what is now Catherine Street, between Madison and Henry Streets. To the west, it overlooked the old Jewish cemetery, of which a portion still exists.

The Rutgers family were prominent figures in New York, engaged in multiple trades, including milling, baking, and brewing. Hermanus Rutgers II married into the De Meyer family, connecting to the legacy of the De Meyer mill. Henry Rutgers, born in the family home, became a colonel in the American Army and was a significant figure in New York City, serving as a friend and adviser to General Washington. He was responsible for commissioning Gilbert Stuart to paint the famous portrait of George Washington.

After the American Revolution, Colonel Rutgers played a key role in revitalizing Queens College in New Brunswick, New Jersey. In recognition of his contributions, the college trustees renamed the institution Rutgers College, which later became Rutgers University. Henry Rutgers died in 1830, and his homestead was eventually demolished by his descendants in 1875.

== End of the mills in NYC ==
On October 19, 1727, the assembly passed legislation to prevent the export of flour that had not passed inspection, aiming to ensure the quality of flour being produced and sold. Following this, on October 22, 1750, town inspectors urged farmers and millers to more diligently monitor their flour's quality.

Over the years, milling methods remained relatively unchanged, though new regulations were introduced periodically. Despite this, the milling industry in New York was largely left to operate independently, and for a considerable time, New York remained a leading milling hub in North America. Nonetheless, competition began to rise in other regions by 1730, with the construction of water-mills in New Jersey and Pennsylvania, which utilized fast-flowing mountain streams ideal for milling. Additionally, there was an uptick in the use of tide-water mills along the Atlantic coast, diversifying the milling infrastructure.

By 1765, as tensions with Britain increased and the American colonies moved towards independence, there was a significant westward and southward migration from New York City. Agriculture expanded into new territories, and Manhattan's windmills, which had been sufficient for local needs, could no longer compete with the numerous water-mills in other regions with better access to water power.

Additionally, Manhattan's agricultural lands were being subdivided into streets and building lots due to urban development. The Revolutionary War further impacted New York's milling industry by disrupting foreign trade, particularly affecting the lucrative West Indies market where New York had held a near-monopoly since 1665.

As a result, New York's role as a milling center began to decline, overshadowed by competition and the city's own industrial and commercial diversification. By the early 19th century, Baltimore had taken over as the milling capital of the United States. Over time, the milling industry continued to migrate, eventually establishing itself in Buffalo, New York, which became a prominent milling city.

== See also ==
- List of windmills in New York
