= Sawkill mill =

Sawmill in New Netherland

Coordinates: 40.785°N 73.983°W

The Sawkill mill was a sawmill and slave quarters established by the Dutch West India Company in 1626, as part of the construction of New Netherland, a colonial province in North America. The mill was located at the mouth of the Sawkill, a stream that originated in what is now Central Park in New York City, and flowed into the East River. The slaves, who were mostly men, cut wood for the new colony and floated the logs which were guided by boat to New Amsterdam, the capital of New Netherland. The mill and the slave quarters are depicted on The Manatus map of 1639, the oldest map of Manhattan Island, which shows the Saw-Kill as a slave settlement of the Dutch West India Company, not as a mill site. This implies that by 1639, the Saw-Kill mill had reduced its wood-cutting activities.

== History ==
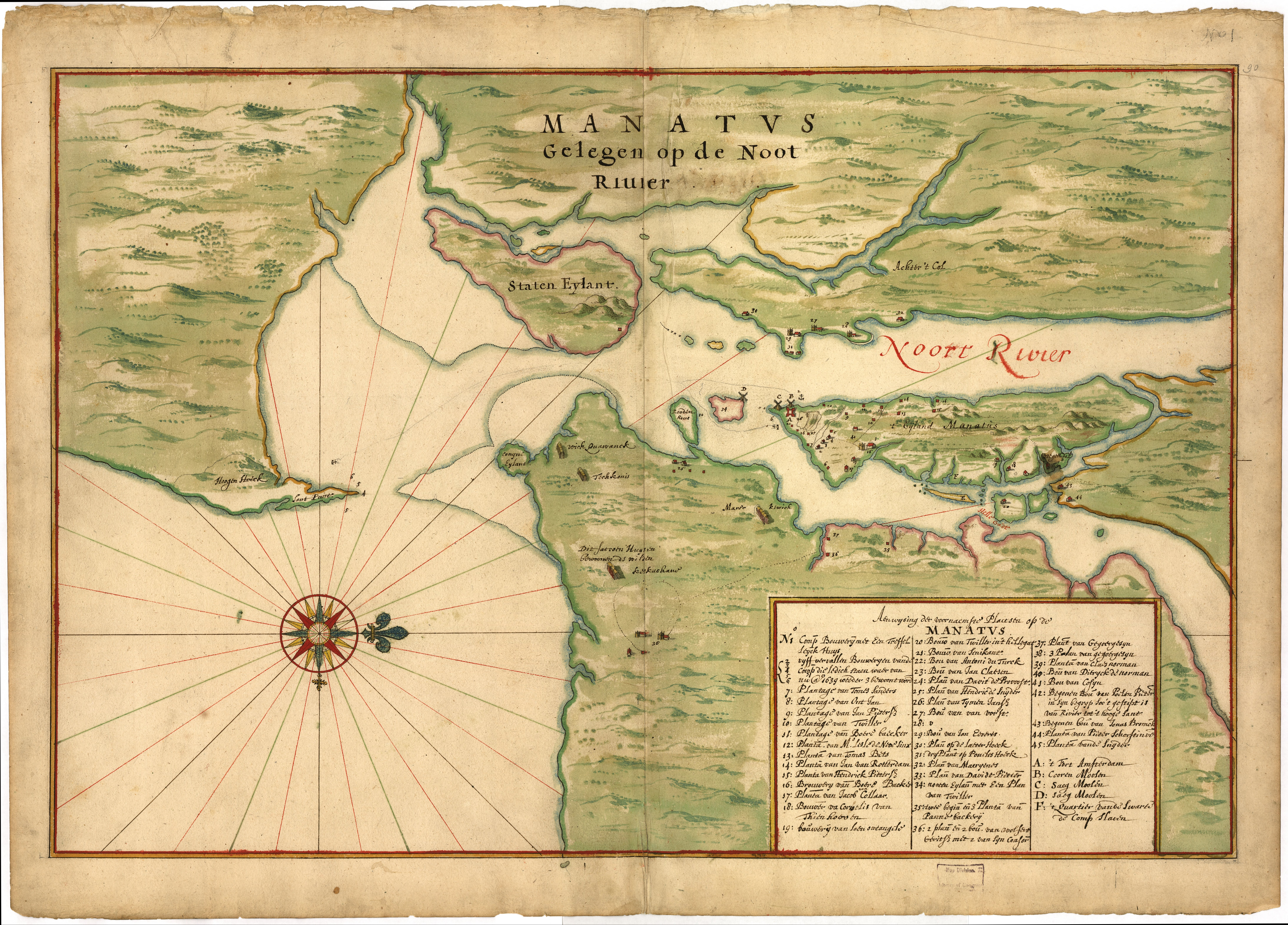
A c. 1639 map, Manatvs gelegen op de Noot Riuier (Manhattan situated on the North River) with windmills at Paggank and Manna Hata marked in legend, the 4th was at F, site of the slave quarters

The Saw-Kill or Colondonck's kill (the Dutch place-name for Saw Mill Creek) was the largest hydrological network on Manhattan island in New York City before the Dutch colony of New Netherland was founded in 1624. The stream received its name from the saw mill that existed for some time “in the bed of 74th Street, about 250 ft east of Avenue A”. The workers of the saw mill are thought to have been primarily the slaves of the Dutch West India Company, whose lodgings, stationed at the mouth of the Sawkill until at least 1639, were referenced as “the quarter of the blacks, the [West India] company’s slaves” in the first landmark map of Manhattan Island, the Manatus Map of 1639.

The creek originated at the present day site of the American Museum of Natural History and ran through the park site, south of Seneca Village, originally exiting the park under Fifth Avenue near 74th Street, where Conservatory Water lies today, before emptying in the East River. To create the Central Park Lake the outlet was dammed with a broad, curving earth dam, which carries the East Carriage Drive past the Kerbs Boathouse (1954), at the end of the Lake's eastern arm, so subtly that few visitors are aware of the landform's function. Before the Dutch colonized Manhates, the island was home to many Native American communities, with more than fifty sites of living, camping, and town-building recorded in what is now New York City. Most of the islanders, about 15,000 people, were part of the Lenni-Lenape, a group of different bands who spoke the Munsee language of the Delaware people. They influenced the environment of Manhattan along with the climate, creating forests and grasslands on the island. Researchers have found that these rich habitats were created by fires that the native people started “to clear the underbrush to ease travel and to increase levels of game”

In December 1626, the Dutch settlers got permission from the Native Peoples, whose names are unknown, to cut wood on the island. This was surprising, because one month earlier, on November 5, 1626, Peter Minuit had supposedly bought Manhates from the “wild men”. This shows that the Native Peoples of Manhates had some power in the Dutch colony in the 1600s. The Dutch settlers and the West India Company's slaves cut down the big Oak, Pine and nut trees of Manhates to make masts for the Dutch Navy and merchant ships, and to build houses.

The Dutch built many mills near the dense woods and the new fort of New Amsterdam, which they founded in 1626. The Manatus Map shows some of these early mills, like the Saw-Kill, in the forested area of Eastern Manhattan.

== Slavery and timber production in Dutch New York ==
The Dutch had a complicated view of slavery in the 1600s. Slavery may have always been part of Manhates, but the first record of slaves on the island was around 1625 or 1626, when the Company human trafficked eleven men, including Paulo d’Angola, Gracia d’Angola, Simon Congo, Anthony de Portuguese, Pieter San Tome, Manuel Minuit, Little Manuel, Big Manuel, Manuel Gerrit de Reus, Jan de Fort Orange, Jan Francisco, and later three women for human-breeding from Angola to Manhates. In 1635, the Company hired Jacob Stoffelsen to look after their “negroes”. The slaves also had Native Americans and “Spanish or Portuguese sailors” who were captured, making them a diverse group like the free people they lived with. Slaves had some rights, like owning property, getting married, having weapons, going to church, celebrating holidays, and following the same laws and rules as other colonists in New Netherland, but they were still not treated fairly. Men usually did hard work, like fixing infrastructure in New Amsterdam and cutting wood.

The West India Company housed their slaves at the Saw-Kill's mouth as early as 1626, where they lived near a small creek and the Wiechquaesgecks Trail. The mill's main workers were the slaves at the Saw-Kill. They cut wood in the forests and used the mill to saw logs, which they put in the Saw-Kill. The logs floated down the stream and were shipped to New Amsterdam or the Netherlands. The Manatus Map of 1639 called the Saw-Kill “the quarter of the blacks, the company’s slaves.” The slaves’ work at the Saw-Kill and other places on Manhates helped build New Amsterdam.

== Bonnel’s mill ==
In 1664 Jan van Bonnel built a sawmill on East 74th Street and the East River, where a 13.71-kilometer-long (8.52 mi) creek or stream, which began in the north of today's Central Park and became known as Saw Kill or Saw Kill Creek, emptied into the river.

The Saw-Kill mill was still a key mill in the late 1600s, as shown by two roads that linked the mill to New Amsterdam and New Harlem. The Saw-Kill was important even though there were two other mills on the east side of Manhates and the West India Company built three more costly mills after settlers came to Manhates in 1626. The Dutch also built mills at Turtle Bay (DeVoor’s mill) (now East 45th- 48th Streets) and Montagne's Kill, also known as Harlem Mill Creek (East 108th Street), using the water power of the creeks on the island's east side. The Saw-Kill was between these two mills. The Dutch built their first sawmill on Noten Island, which had many nut trees in the Dutch Colonial Period. The mill on Nut Island was taken down for iron in 1648. These saw mills, some using water and some using wind, helped build New Amsterdam, make homes for the Dutch colonists, and improve the Dutch Navy and trade ships in the 1600s. The Saw-Kill, which was called “the well known Saw-kill, which played an important part in the early days of Manhattan,” was forgotten over time.

== Saw-Kill’s later years ==
A surveyor called the property “ye run of water formerly called ye saw mill creeke” in 1677, showing that the sawmill that gave the stream its name had stopped working long ago. George Elphinstone and Abraham Shotwell, became owners of the property and replaced the sawmill with a leather mill that year.

Finally, the Saw-Kill was moved into a culvert, “arched over, and its trickling little stream was called Arch Brook”. Before this happened, though, the Saw-Kill Bridge was built over the creek which ran through the park site, south of Seneca Village, originally exiting the park under Fifth Avenue near 74th Street, where Conservatory Water lies today, before emptying near 75th Street in the East River. The crossing, what was known as “The Kissing Bridge,” was first called that in 1806. Built for the Eastern Post Road, it approximately ran along what today is Third Avenue. It was four miles north of town, in a beautiful and quiet area, near the present Third Avenue and 77th Street and that made the Saw-Kill Bridge the best Kissing Bridge of three such in Manhattan in the 1700s. People still thought that in the 1800s.

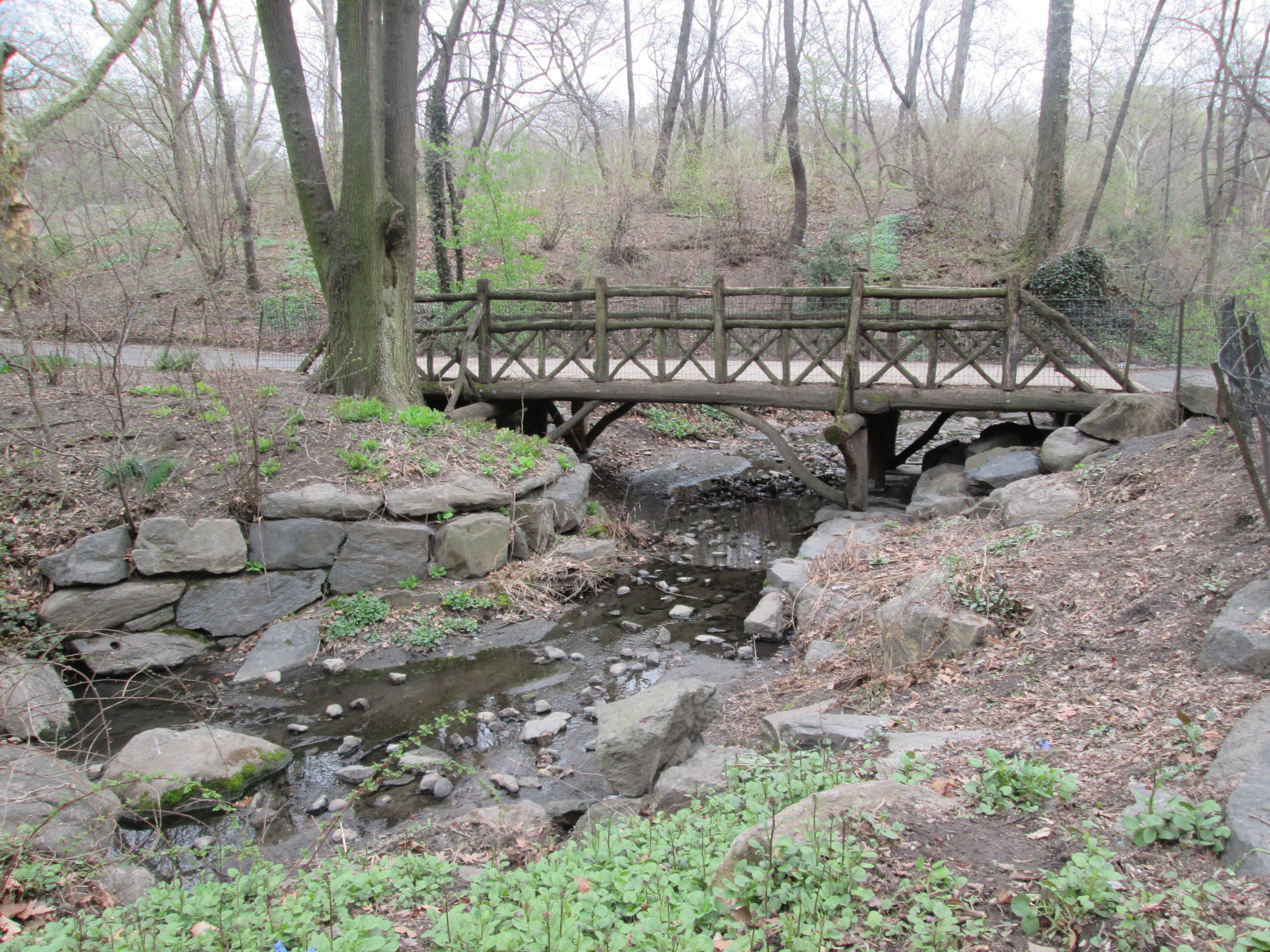
Remnant of the Sawkill in Central Park

The waters of the Saw-Kill are still in Central Park, even though Arch Brook is gone. When Central Park was built in the middle of the 1800s, the planners used the Saw-Kill's source waters, under the American Museum of Natural History, to make the 22-acre Lake that New Yorkers like today. The Saw-Kill kept flowing into Ladies Pond until the early 1900s. Ladies Pond was a small pond for ice skating, with two bays joined by the Saw-Kill. It was for women only, so they could change their shoes without men looking at them. But things changed, and Ladies Pond was not used anymore. In 1930, they filled up the Pond to make a path for people to walk on. That was the end of the Saw-Kill's last waterway.

Frederick Ambrose Clark developed a good portion of West 74th Street in 1902–04, the Saw-kill's culvert was just south of the roadway.

== See also ==
- New Amsterdam's windmills
- List of tide mills on Long Island
- List of windmills in New York
