= The Forum at 343 East 74th Street =

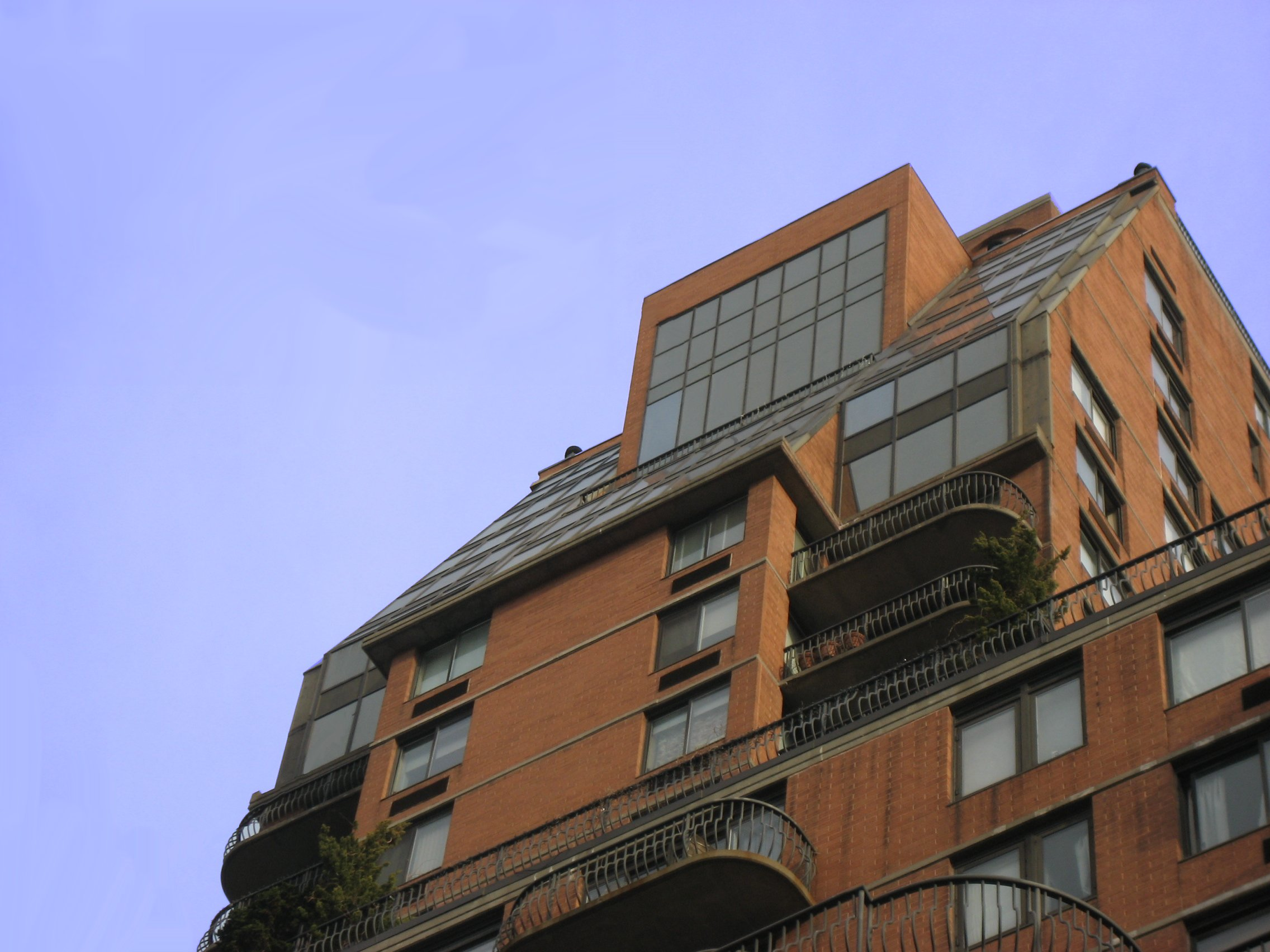
- Interactive map of the The Forum at 343 East 74th Street area

General information
- Status: Completed
- Type: Residential condop
- Location: 343 East 74th Street; New York, NY
- Coordinates: 40°46′10.22″N 73°57′20.83″W
- Completed: 1986
- Opening: 1987
- Owner: The Forum Owners Corp.
- Management: AKAM Management

Height
- Roof: 271 ft (83 m)

Technical details
- Floor count: 25

Design and construction
- Architect: Elliott Vilkas
- Developer: Carlyle Development Corp.

Website
- www.theforumny.com

The Forum at 343 East 74th Street is a 25-story residential condop building located on the Upper East Side in New York City. The building is located midblock between First and Second Avenue on 74th Street.

The building, which was completed in 1986, was opened to residents in 1987 and comprises 148 apartment units ranging in size from studios to three-bedroom apartments. This does not account for apartment combinations.

== The building ==
The Forum at 343 East 74th Street Logo

The Forum, which was designed by architect Elliott Vilkas, is often noted from a distance for its pronounced sloping curtain wall on the building's south side. The sloping glass wall was designed to provide optimum light for the duplex and triplex units that occupy the top floors. The building's massing is also noted as unique for a midblock building, with roughly half of its frontage set back to create a small plaza along 74th Street featuring two-story arched windows at the base of the building.

The apartments in the building range in size from 550-square-foot (51 m^{2}) studios to 1,900-square-foot (180 m^{2}) three-bedroom penthouse units. The building's top five floors make up a penthouse complex, comprising a small number of large three-bedroom duplex and triplex apartments.

The Forum is located roughly equidistant between First and Second Avenues, whereas taller buildings in Manhattan are typically located at the corner intersection of an avenue due to zoning restrictions. The Forum is located between the Holy Trinity Greek Orthodox Cathedral and the Jan Hus Presbyterian Church. Also located on the same block as the Forum are The Cathedral School and IPS (The International Preschools).

Among other amenities, the building features a parking garage, health club, roof deck and concierge. Each of the units in the building includes a washer dryer unit, which was relatively unique in the mid-1980s when the building was constructed.

== History ==
The Forum was originally developed by the Carlyle Development Corporation and designed by the Vilkas Group and completed in 1986. The building, which has 148 cooperative apartments was opened to residents in 1987. During the construction of the Forum, the zoning restrictions between 59th Street and 96th Street were changed to limit the construction of large mid-block buildings.

The ownership of the Forum is structured as a condop with the residents of the building's residential units owning a single condominium through a corporation. The Forum was among the most notable examples of the use of the condop structure when it came into vogue in the 1980s.

The land on which the Forum is located was leased from the church, located next door, through a ground lease that extends for 149 years from 1987 through 2136.

== Gallery ==
The Forum at 343 East 74th Street
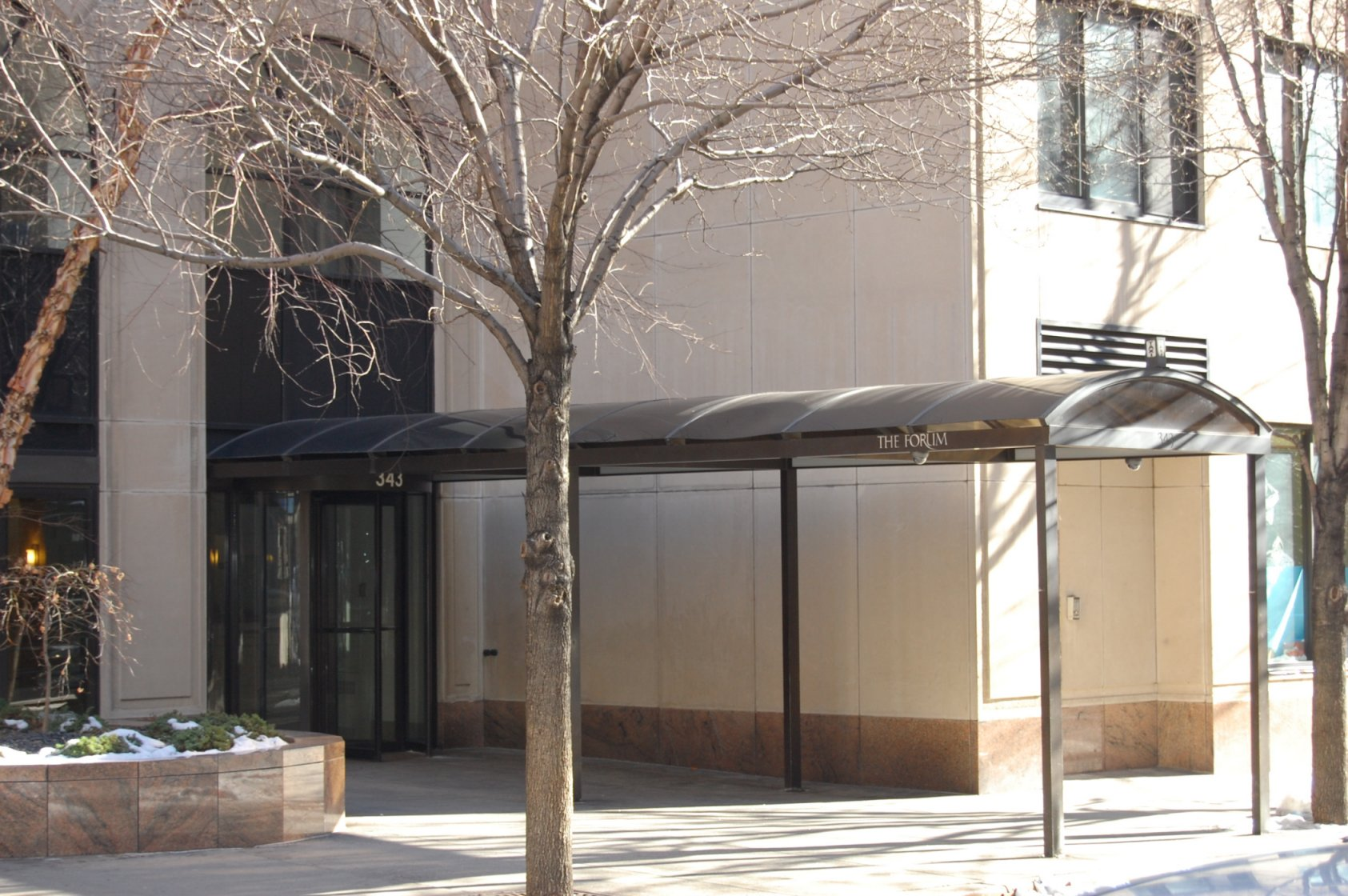
Front entrance

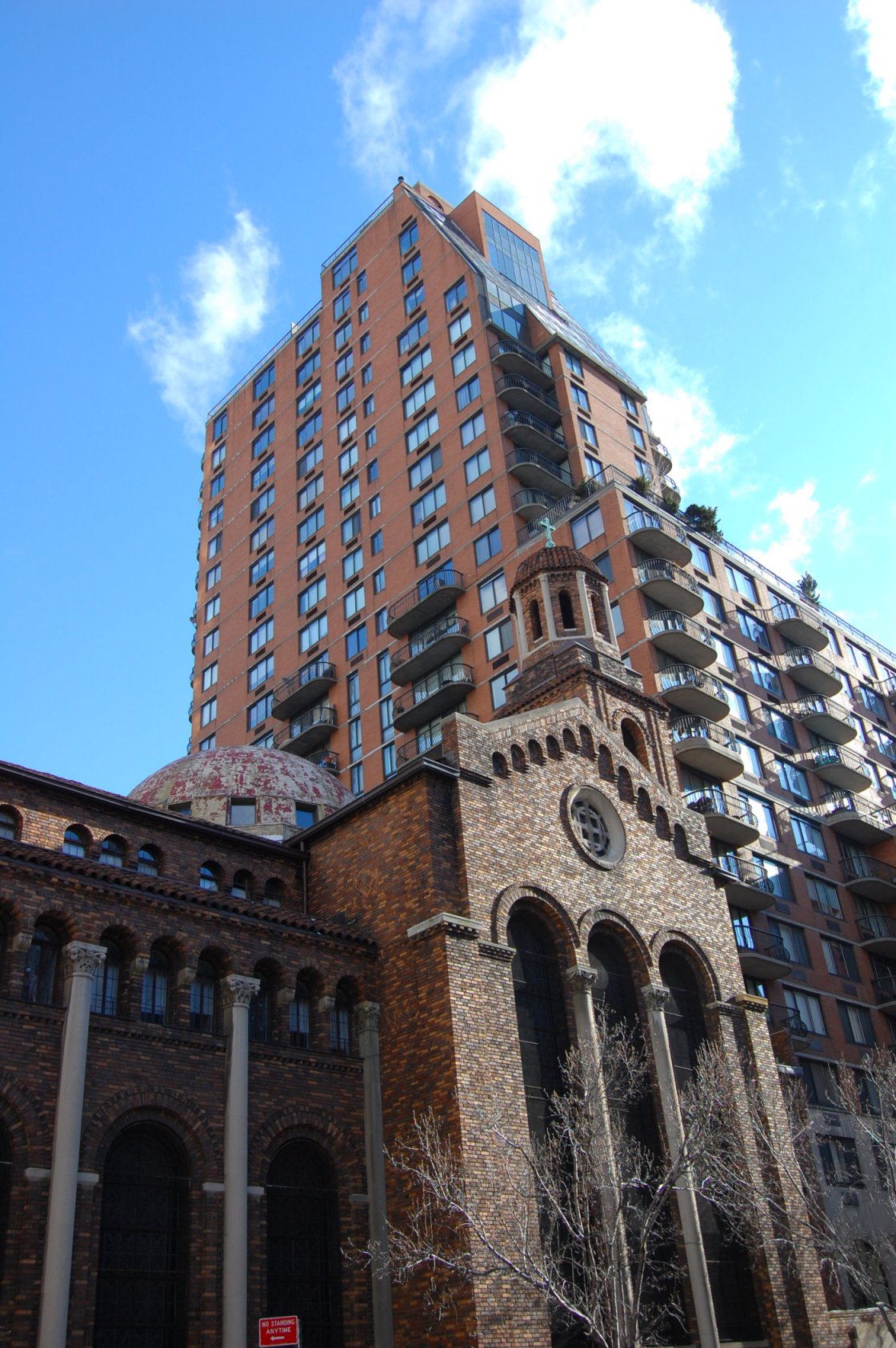
View of the Forum and the Greek Orthodox Church

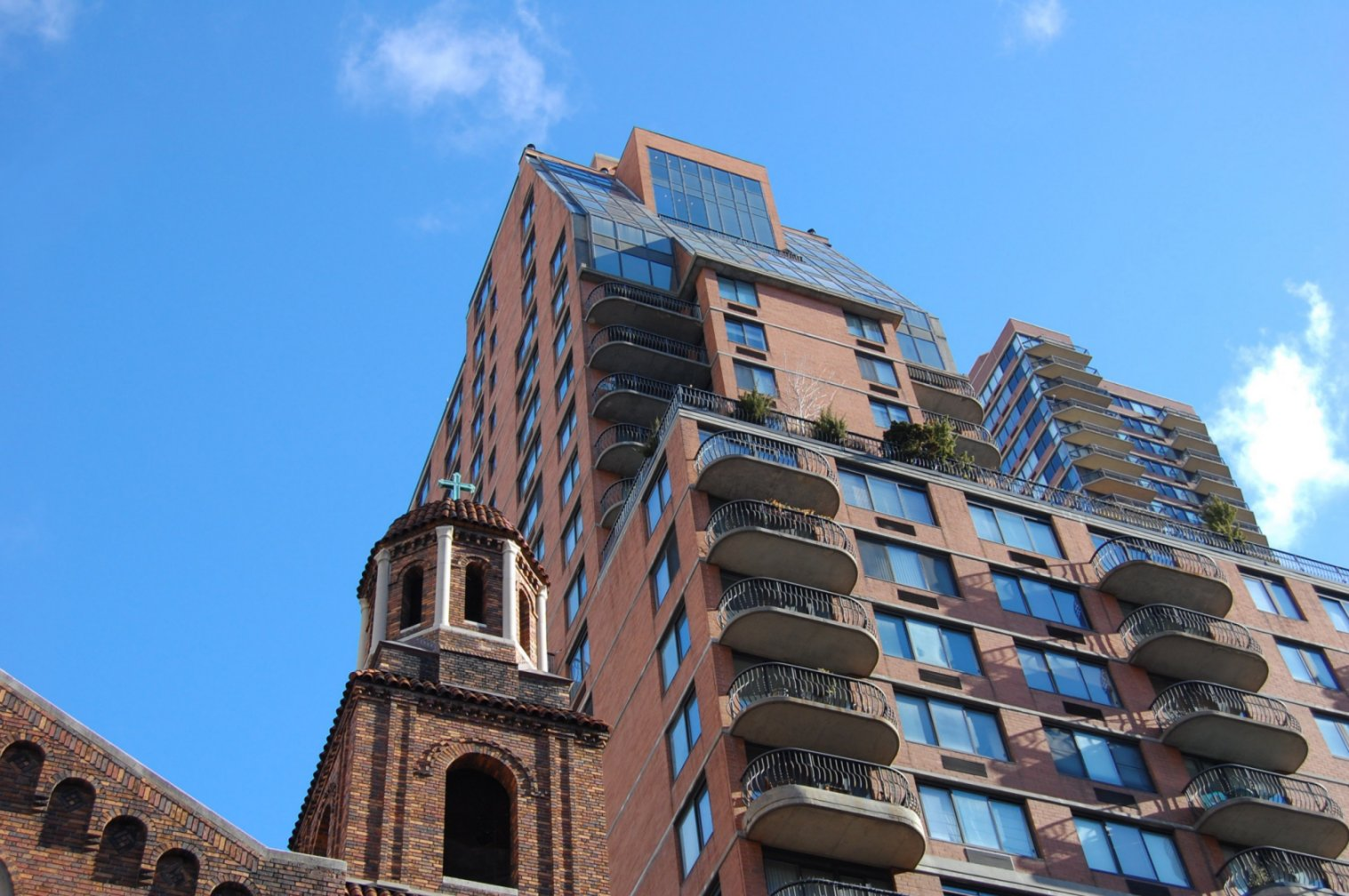
Front view

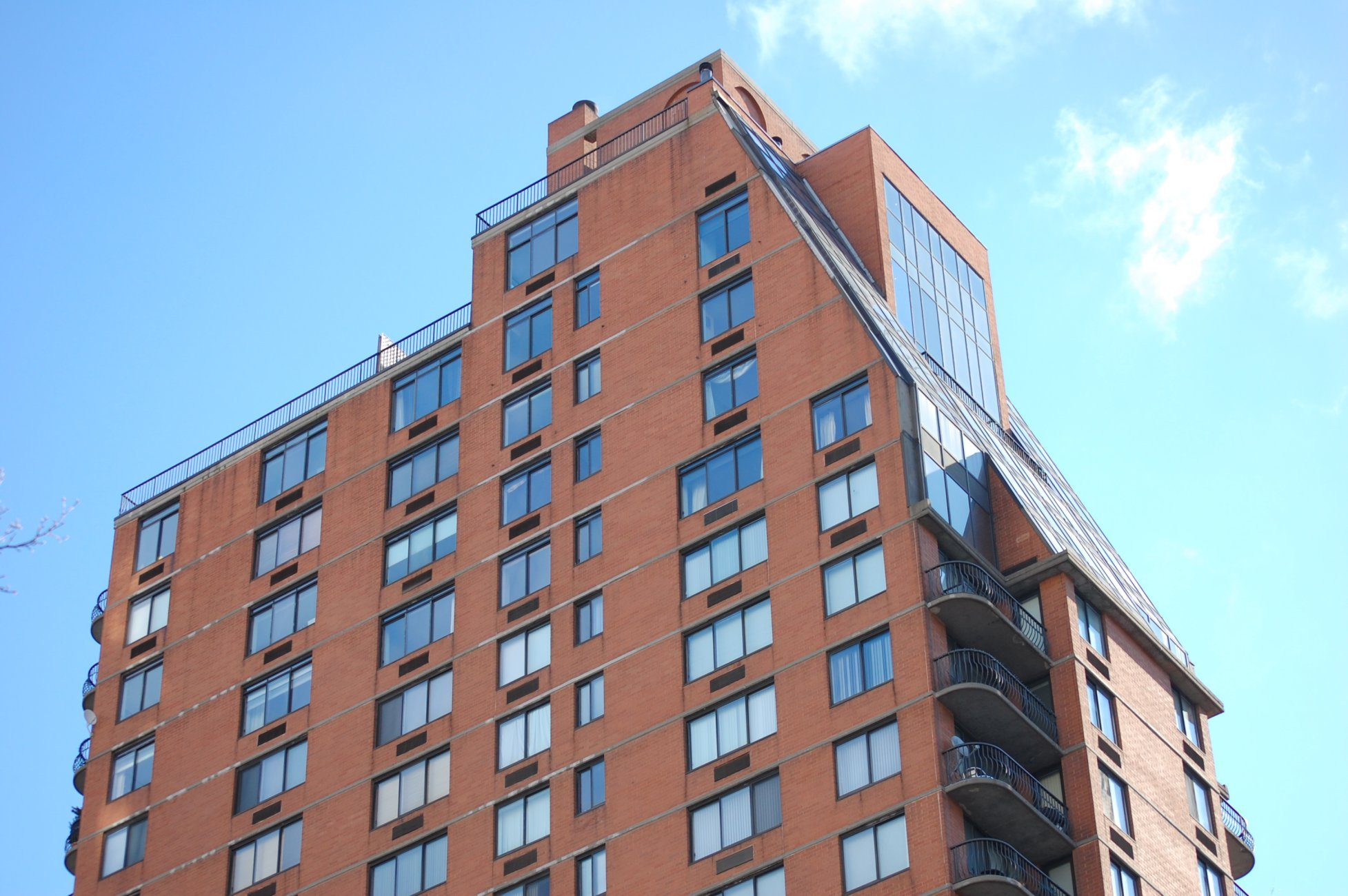
Side view

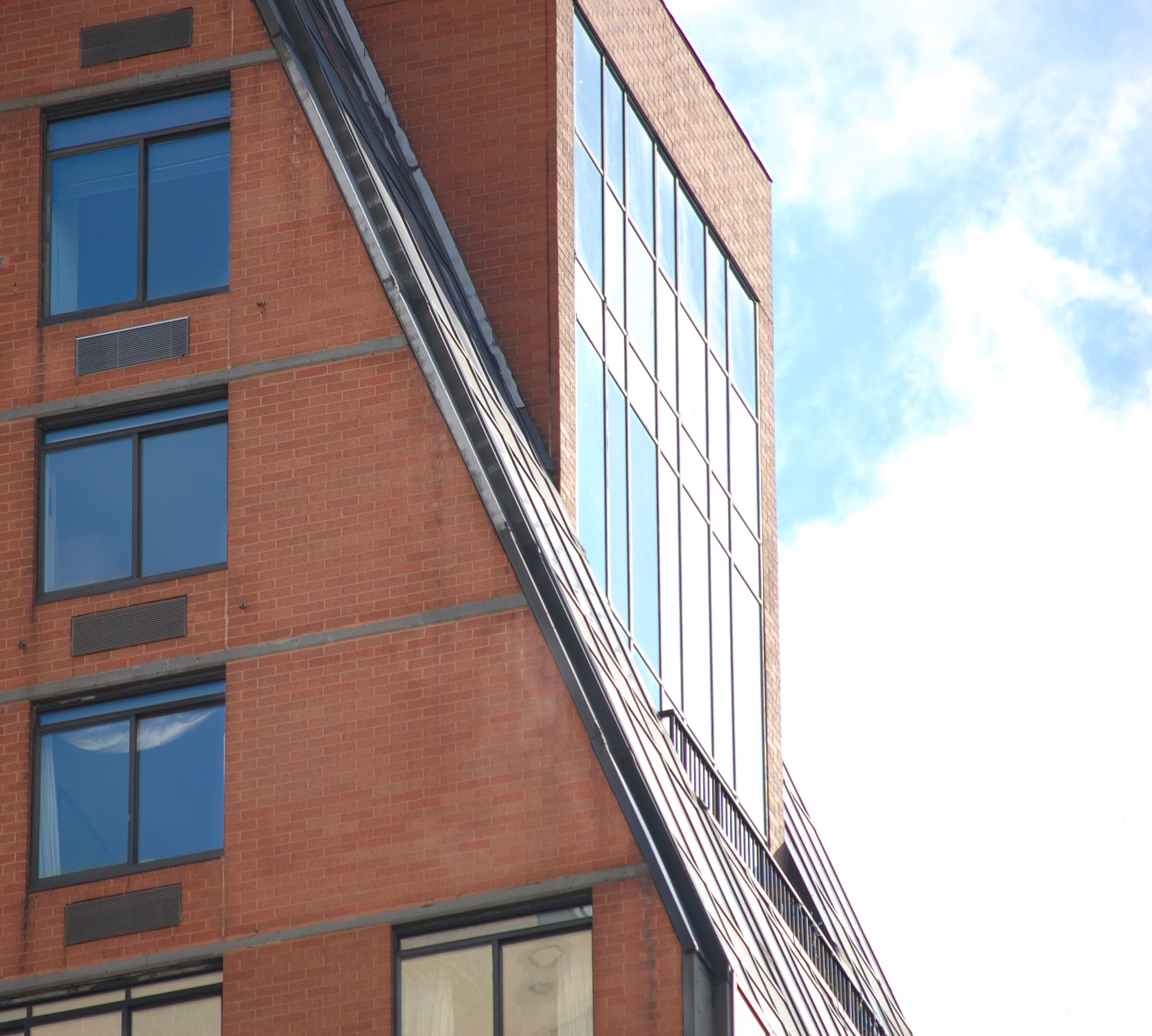
The Forum's sloping curtain wall

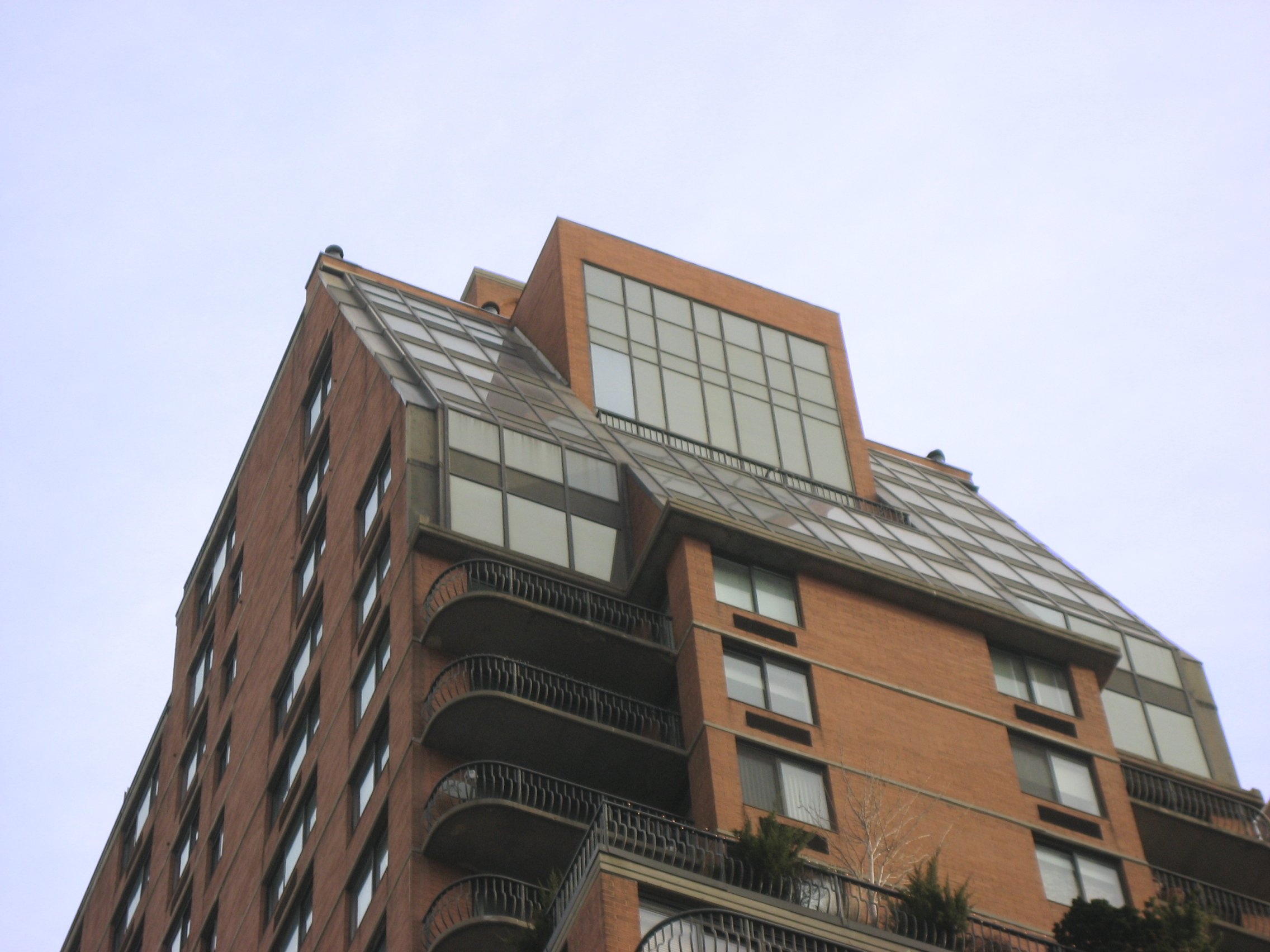
The Forum's Penthouse

== See also ==
- Doorman building
