= Levain Bakery =

Bakeries of the United States

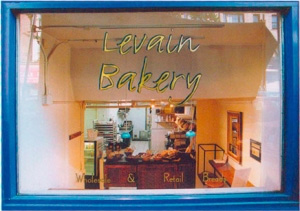
- Front of New York City store
- Founded: 1995 in Manhattan, New York City
- Founders: Constance McDonald and Pamela Weekes
- Owners: Constance McDonald and Pamela Weekes

Levain Bakery, pronounced as (luh-ven), is a retail bakery that opened in 1995 and is located at 167 West 74th Street, on the Upper West Side neighborhood of Manhattan, New York City. In June 2000 a second retail location was opened for seasonal business at 354 Montauk Highway, Wainscott, in the Hamptons area of eastern Long Island. A third store is located in the Harlem neighborhood of Manhattan, New York City. In 2017, a fourth store was opened near the original location on the Upper West Side, and since then three more locations have opened on the Upper East Side and in NoHo and Williamsburg. In 2020, Levain opened their first store outside of New York, in Georgetown, Washington, D.C. In 2023, Levain opened a location in the Larchmont area of Los Angeles. As of June 2024, there are seventeen locations: nine in the New York City area, two each in Chicago, Washington D.C., and Boston, and one each in Los Angeles and Philadelphia.

== History ==
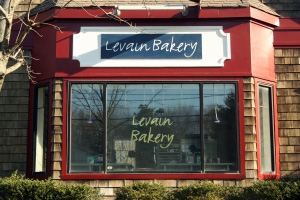
Front of Wainscott store

Founded and co-owned by Constance McDonald and Pamela Weekes, the bakery initially opened to serve a variety of fresh-baked artisanal breads. The bakery has since become notable for its 6-ounce chocolate chip walnut cookies.

McDonald and Weekes developed the signature cookie recipe while training for an Ironman Triathlon. They discovered they needed a large number of calories to offset the rigors of training and decided on a traditional chocolate chip cookie, but much bigger. The 6-ounce chocolate chip walnut cookie served the purpose and ultimately became a signature item in their bakery. The cookie has spawned copycats. In 1998 Levain Bakery expanded its cookie business to include mail order and in 2022 expanded their services to offer catering as well as nationwide shipping through Doordash.

== Appearances in media ==
The Food Network has featured Levain Bakery in episodes of Throwdown with Bobby Flay, Roker on the Road, Unwrapped, Top 5, The Best Thing I Ever Ate, Sweet Dreams, and Worth It. In December 2007, Levain Bakery was featured on an episode of Fashionably Late with Stacy London. In June 2008, Budget Travel listed Levain Bakery #3 of “50 Reasons You Love New York City.” They have been featured in the following books:

- The Slow Food Guide To New York City, Patrick Martins and Ben Watson.
- New York's 50+ Best Places to Enjoy Dessert, Andrea DiNoto and Paul Stiga.
- A Day at the Beach, Helen Schulman.
- Cook What You Love, Bob and Melinda Blanchard.
- Jodi’s Shortcuts 2000 and Jodi’s Shortcuts 2002, Jodi Della Femina and Daniel Benedict
- Food and the city, Ina Yalof.
