= Caravaggio (restaurant) =

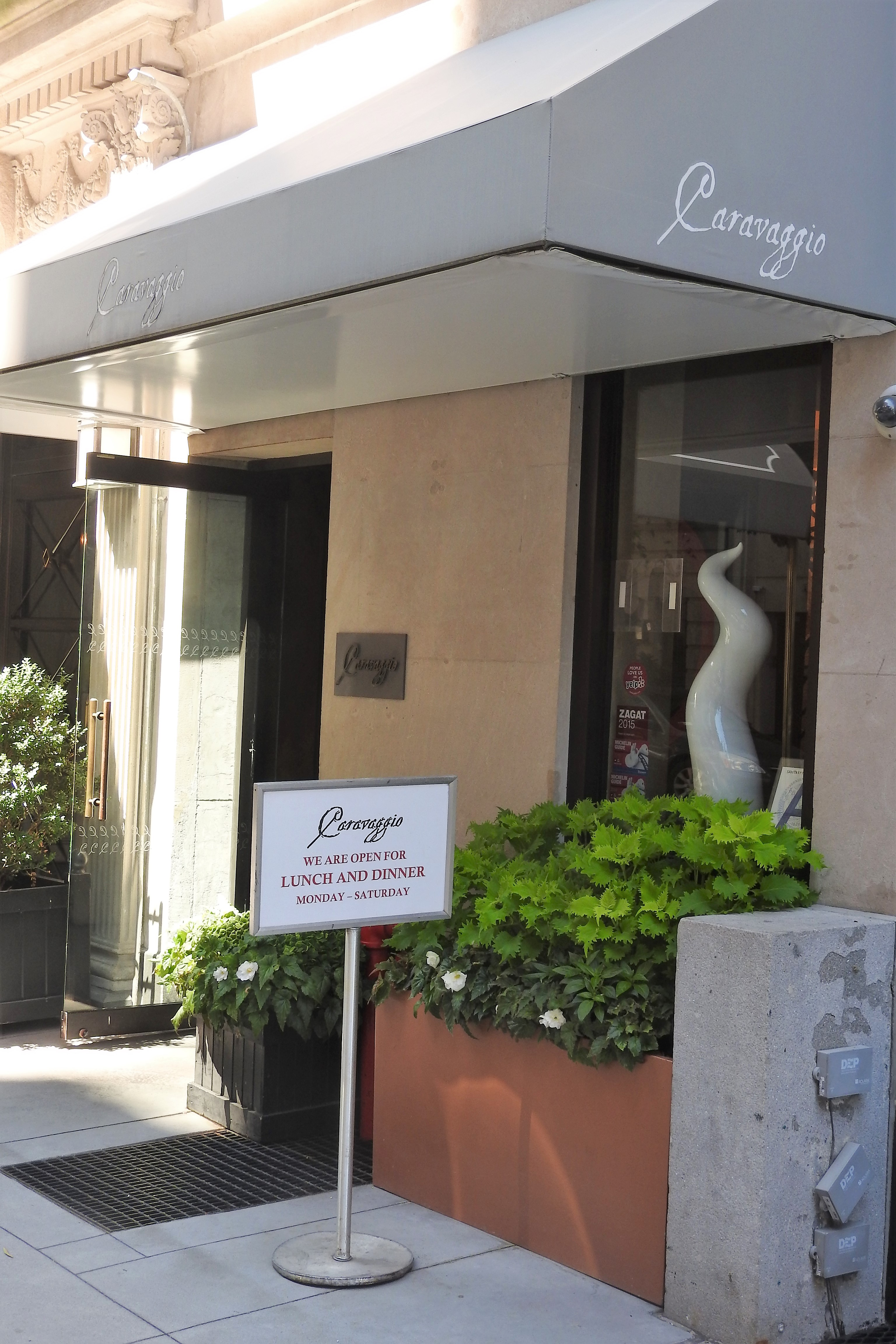
- Interactive map of Caravaggio

Restaurant information
- Established: July 15, 2009; 16 years ago
- Owners: Giuseppe, Antonio, Cosimo, and Geraldo Bruno
- Chef: Isauro “Luis” Rosas and Massimo Bebber
- Food type: Italian
- Dress code: Smart casual; shorts are not allowed
- Location: 23 East 74th Street (between 5th Avenue and Madison Avenue), on the Upper East Side, in Manhattan, New York, New York, 10021, United States
- Coordinates: 40.773351°N 73.964905°W
- Website: caravaggioristorante.com

Caravaggio is an Italian restaurant located at 23 East 74th Street (between 5th Avenue and Madison Avenue) on the Upper East Side in Manhattan, in New York City. It is around the corner from the Met Breuer.

== History ==
The restaurant opened July 15, 2009. It is owned by Giuseppe Bruno.

== Menu ==
Giuseppe Bruno is Executive Chef. Among its dishes are meatballs, eggplant parmigiana, roasted red snapper, roasted swordfish, dover sole, veal chops, ossobuco with saffron risotto, bomboloni, and cannoli.

== Decor ==
The restaurant exhibits two paintings and a sculpture by pop artist Donald Baechler. It also exhibits art by Frank Stella and Ellsworth Kelly, and four original Henri Matisse stencil lithographs. It has silk-lined walls, and leather seating.

== Reviews ==
In 2013, a review in The New York Times described it as "one of the most civilized Italian restaurants to turn up anywhere in the city in the last few years," but also stated, "...for all its civility, [Caravaggio] is haunted by inconsistency more than three years into its run. Some of my meals there were very good; in others, I couldn’t find a single dish to get excited about, and there were a few that were just not right at all." Overall, their score was 1 star out of a possible 4.

== See also ==
- List of Italian restaurants
