= Condop =

The term condop in real estate refers to a mixed-use condominium building where at least one of the units is owned by a cooperative corporation and sub-divided into many "co-op" apartments. The other condo units are typically retained or sold separately by the developer and may be retail space, office space or parking garage.

== History ==
Condops first came into use in the 1960s when the residential condominium was not yet popular in major cities, particularly in the United States in New York City, New York. This structure was used to separate the residential component from the commercial components of a building. Developers or co-op sponsors sought to retain ownership of the more lucrative non-residential spaces in a building, whilst also minimizing taxes on non-residential income. The condop is still a relatively rare item in the U.S. As of 2007, New York City had fewer than 300 condop buildings as compared to more than 6,700 cooperatives and 2,300 condominiums, representing just over three percent of residential buildings.

== Legal definition ==
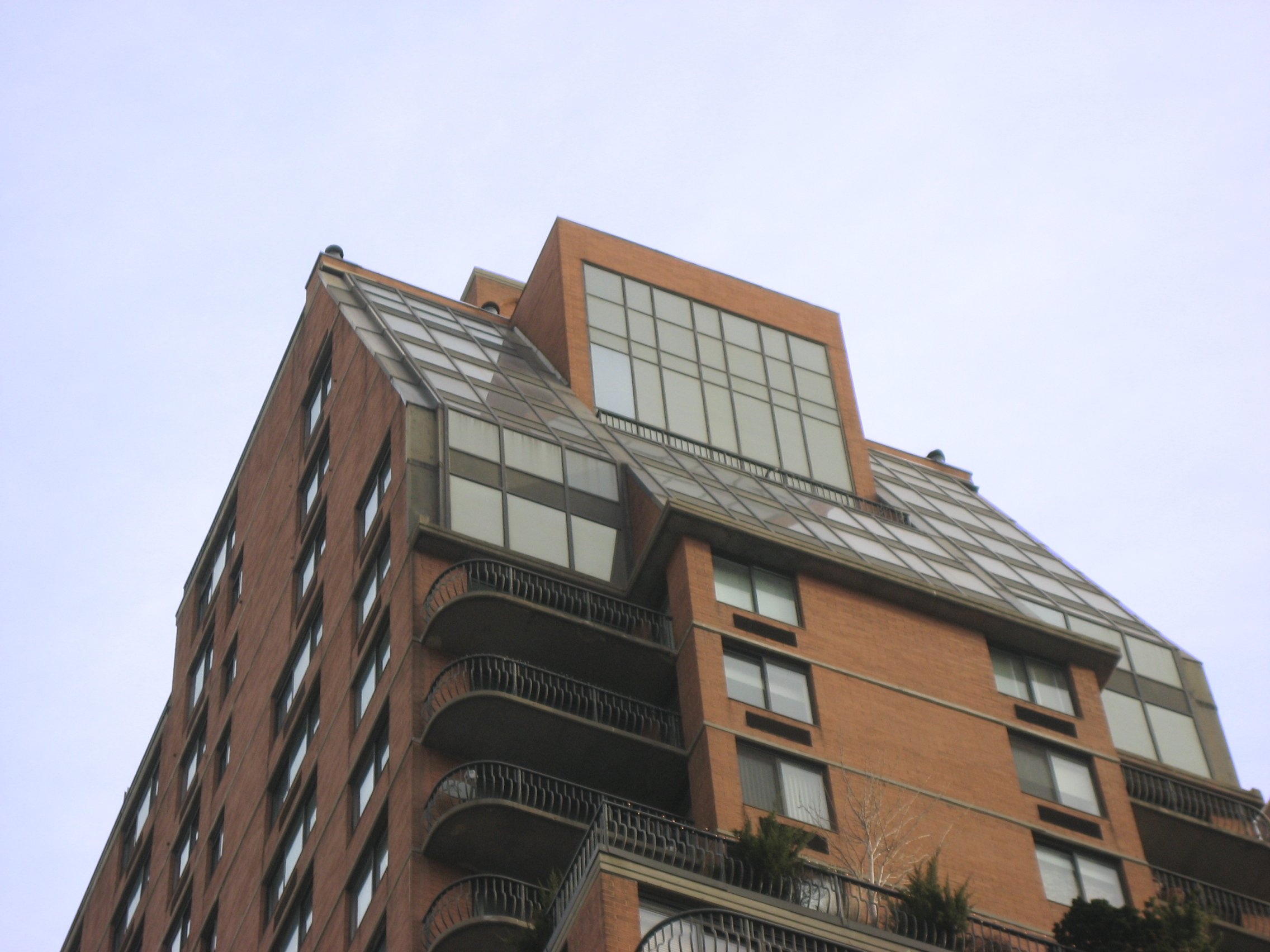
The Forum at 343 East 74th Street is an example of a condop in New York City, New York, where the co-op corporation owns the residential portion of the building and the developer owns the retail space.

The condop is a type of condominium building, not a distinct legal construct. A condop, a portmanteau of the words condominium and cooperative (or "co-op"), is a co-op inside a condo.

Stepping back, condominium owners actually hold title to a piece of real estate. Co-op owners are actually shareholder-tenants with shares in and a long-term lease from the co-op corporation. In all co-ops, a corporation owns the building. Condops are a variation on that theme the distinction between the two concepts as the cooperative corporation does not own a whole building but just the residential condominium unit within it.

== Common use and misuse ==
Sometimes the phrase condop is used to refer to the residential portion only of such a building (i.e. to distinguish it from the commercial unit(s)). However, this term is commonly misused to describe a cooperative corporation that behaves like a condominium.

The cooperative portion of the condop is effectively no different than any cooperative building that contains only residential units. However, in some real-estate circles, the term condop continues to be mis-used to refer to a cooperative that behaves like a condominium or a "co-op with condo rules". Typically condo will require a lower down payment for prospective purchasers and do not include many of the restrictive measures that impact prospective purchasers of cooperative apartments. Further, the bylaws for a condo typically do not include the need for board approval to sell or sublet an apartment. Additionally, restrictions on alterations to the apartment are more consistent with cooperatives than condos.

== See also ==
- Index of real estate articles
